= River Road Stone Arch Railroad Bridge =

- U.S. National Register of Historic Places
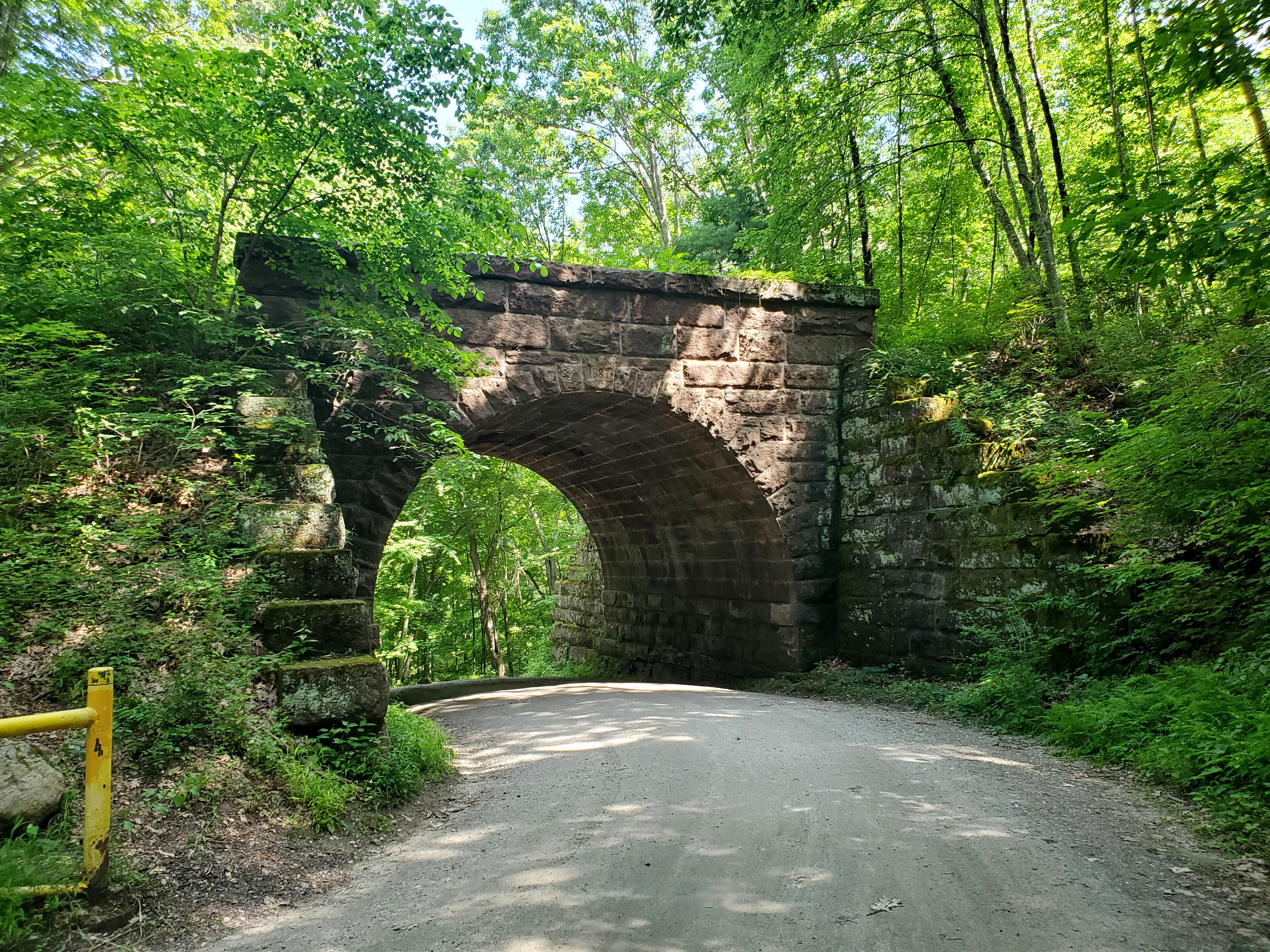
- The bridge in June 2021

- Location within Connecticut Location within the United States
- Location: River Road, and former Air Line Railroad right-of-way, Colchester, Connecticut
- Coordinates: 41°34′50.2″N 72°25′30″W
- Area: less than one acre
- Built: 1887
- NRHP reference No.: 86002727
- Added to NRHP: August 21, 1986

The River Road Stone Arch Railroad Bridge is a historic bridge carrying the former Air Line Railroad right-of-way over River Road in Salmon River State Forest in Colchester, Connecticut. Built in 1887, it is a well-preserved example of a period masonry railroad bridge, built as part of a state-mandated program for the reduction of the number of grade crossings in the state. The bridge was listed on the National Register of Historic Places in 1986.

== Description and history ==
The River Road Stone Arch Railroad Bridge is located in a rural setting of northwestern Colchester, within Salmon River State Forest. River Road is a gravel road paralleling the Blackledge River, between the river and the railroad right of way. When the river and road bend to the northwest, the railroad line crosses both, the road on this bridge, and the river on the Blackledge River Railroad Bridge. This bridge is a round-arch masonry structure, made out of mortared ashlar brownstone. The arch has a span at its base of 22 feet (6.7 m) and is 18 feet (5.5 m) high. The sidewalls of the bridge rise 4 feet (1.2 m) above the former height of the tracks, and all four corners of the bridge have wing walls that extend the structure to retain part of the embankment carrying the right of way.

The Air Line Railway was developed in the 1870s, as a more straight-line connection between New Haven, Connecticut and Boston, Massachusetts, via Middletown. Originally this was a grade crossing, but increasing train speeds prompted the state to mandate railroads operating in it to reduce the number of such crossings. This bridge was built in 1887, and was apparently one of several similar bridges. Its arch voussoirs are individually numbered, suggesting that they were cut at a central location and shipped to the site.

== See also ==
- National Register of Historic Places listings in New London County, Connecticut
- List of bridges on the National Register of Historic Places in Connecticut
