= Jeremy's Back =

Mountain ridge in Connecticut, United States

Coordinates: 41°35′18″N 72°23′05″W

Jeremy's Back is a mountain ridge in New London County, Connecticut. It is named after Jeremy Adams, one of the original founders of Hartford, Connecticut.

It is located near the Jeremy River (also named after Jeremy Adams), a favorite paddling destination in the area.
