= Salmon River Trail =

Hiking trail in Connecticut, U.S.

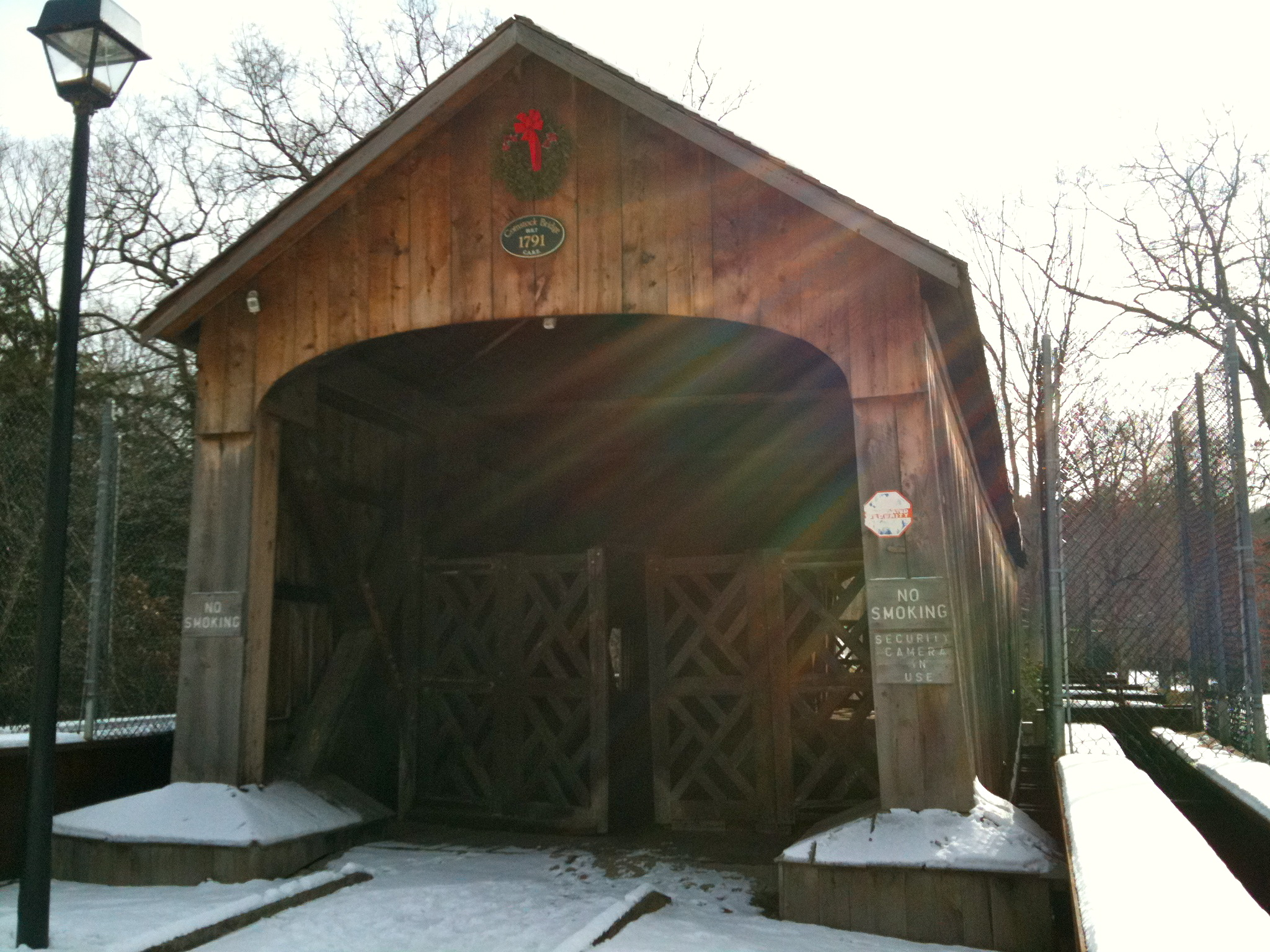
- Comstock Covered Bridge at parking lot entrance.
- Length: 6.9 miles (11.1 km)
- Location: Colchester / East Hampton, Connecticut, USA
- Designation: CFPA Blue-Blazed Trail
- Use: hiking, cross-country skiing, snowshoeing, fishing, geocaching, other
- Hazards: hunters, deer ticks, poison ivy

The Salmon River Trail is a 6.9-mile (11.1 km) Blue-Blazed hiking trail in Colchester, and East Hampton, Connecticut and is almost entirely in the Salmon River State Forest and Day Pond State Park. Almost all of the trail is in Colchester, the parking lot and part of the Comstock Covered Bridge over the Salmon River are in East Hampton.

== Trail description ==
The Salmon River Trail is primarily used for hiking, backpacking, picnicking, and in the winter, snowshoeing.

Portions of the trail are suitable for, and are used for, cross-country skiing and geocaching. Site-specific activities enjoyed along the route include bird watching, hunting (very limited), fishing, horseback riding, bouldering and rock climbing (limited).

=== Trail route ===
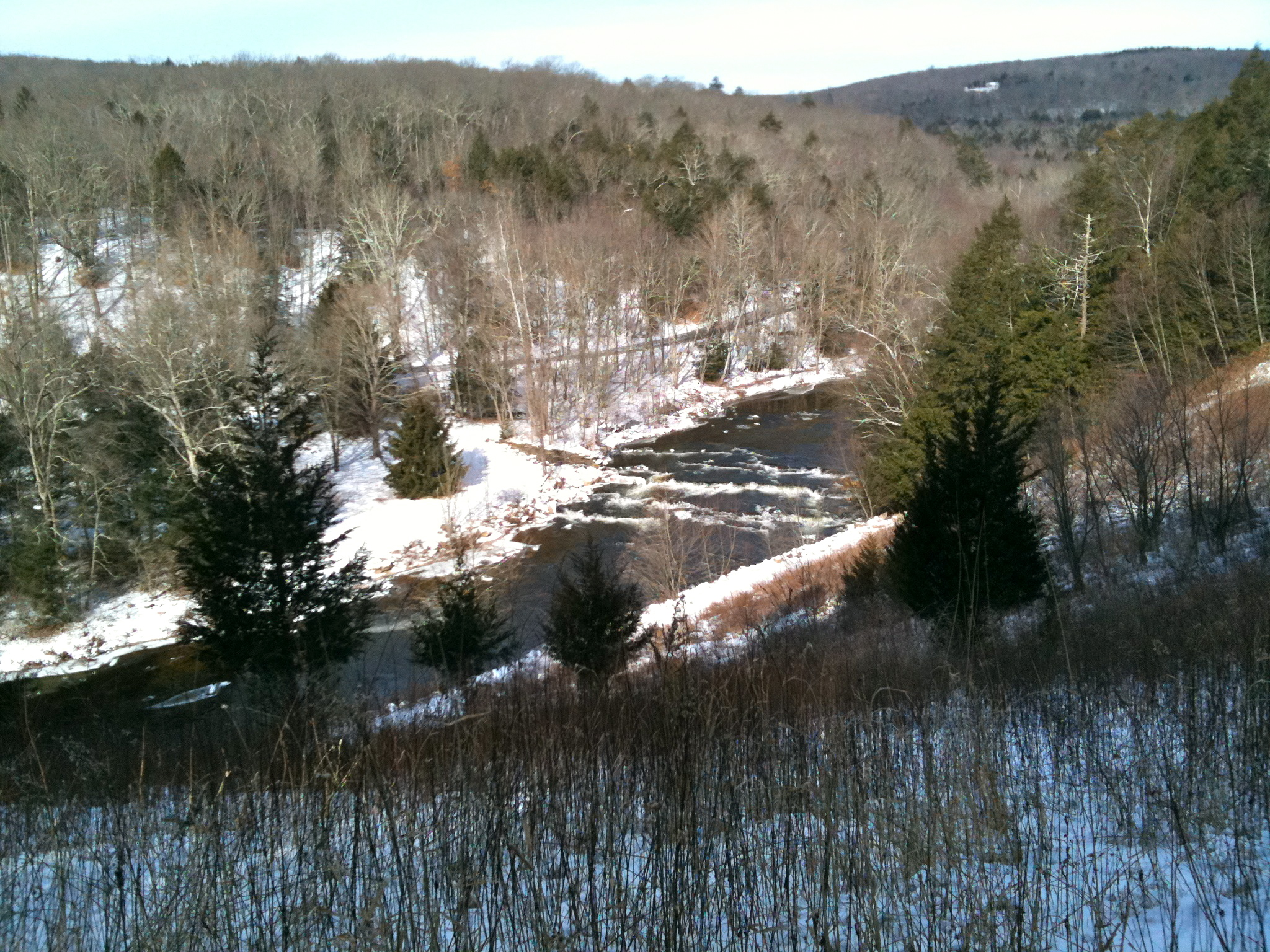
Salmon River up river from the Comstock Bridge viewed from the Salmon River Trail.

=== Trail communities ===
The official Blue-Blazed Salmon River Trail passes through land located within the following municipalities, from south to north: Colchester and East Hampton, Connecticut.

== Landscape, geology, and natural environment ==
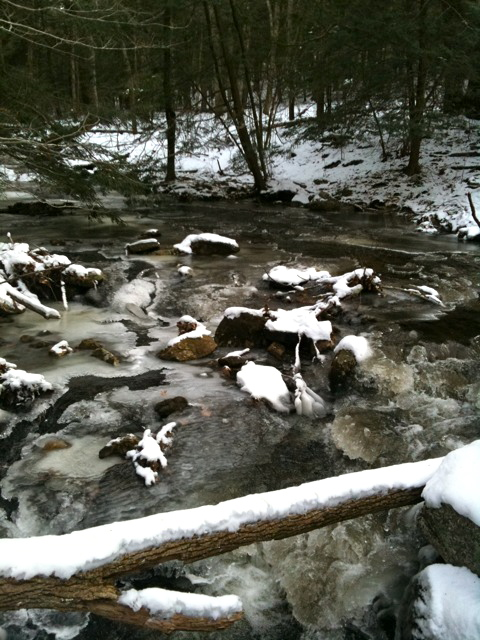
Snow, ice and water at a stream crossing on the Salmon River Trail.

== History and folklore ==
The Blue-Blazed Salmon River Trail was created by the Connecticut Forest and Park Association.

=== Historic sites ===
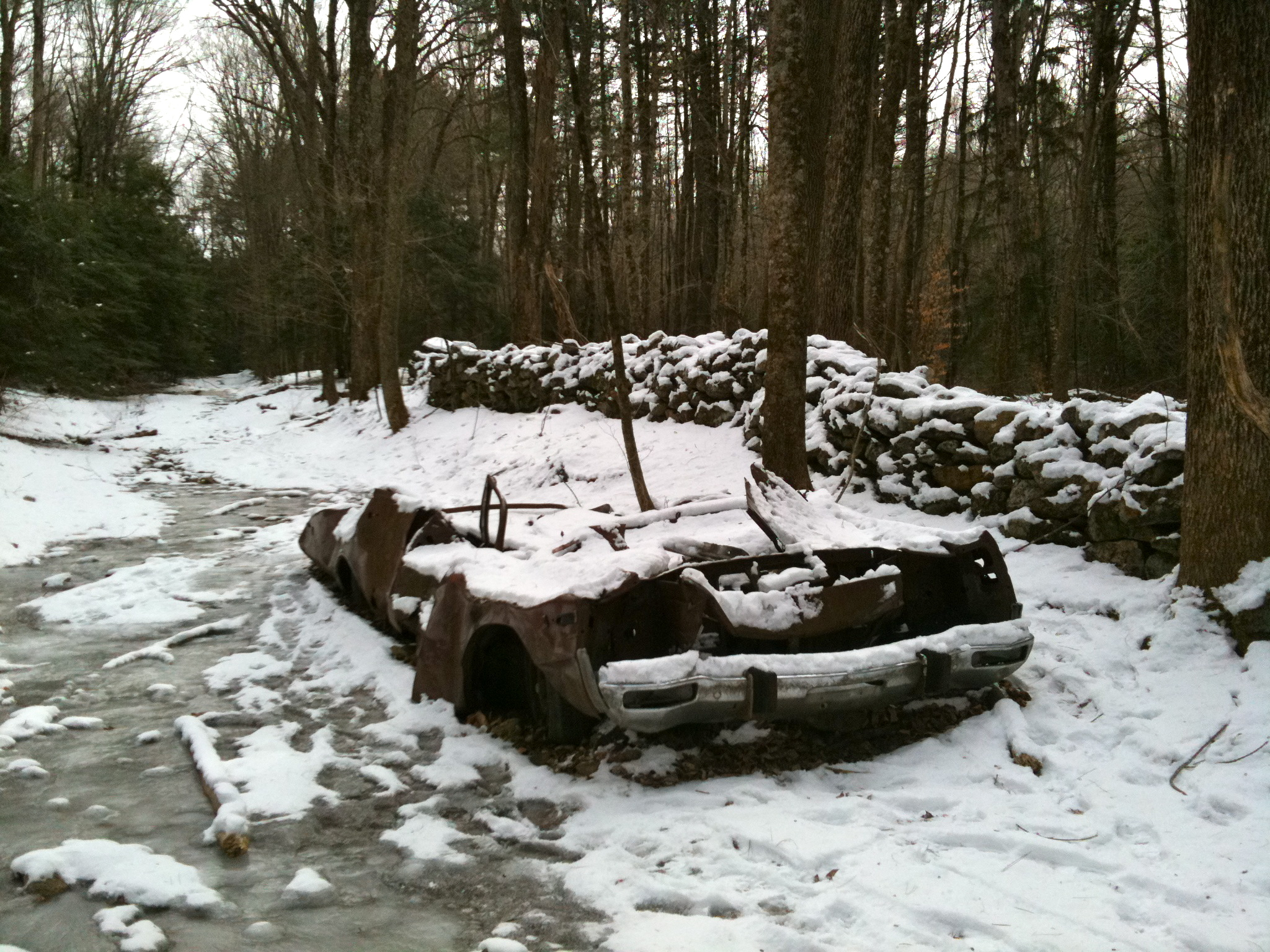
Car wreck in snow on the Salmon River Trail's North Loop (near Day Pond Brook).

== Hiking the trail ==
The mainline trail is blazed with blue rectangles. Trail descriptions are available from a number of commercial and non-commercial sources, and a complete guidebook is published by the Connecticut Forest and Park Association

Weather along the route is typical of Connecticut. Conditions on exposed ridge tops and summits may be harsher during cold or stormy weather. Lightning is a hazard on exposed summits and ledges during thunderstorms. Snow is common in the winter and may necessitate the use of snowshoes. Ice can form on exposed ledges and summits, making hiking dangerous without special equipment.

Biting insects can be bothersome during warm weather. Parasitic deer ticks (which are known to carry Lyme disease) are a potential hazard. Wearing bright orange clothing during the hunting season (Fall through December) is recommended.

== See also ==
- Blue-Blazed Trails
- Colchester
- East Hampton
- Salmon River State Forest
