= Jeremy Adams =

Early settler of Hartford, Connecticut

Coordinates: 41°35′18″N 72°23′05″W

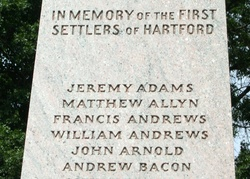
- Born: Jeremiah Adams; 1604/1605; England
- Died: August 11, 1683
- Monuments: Founders Monument of Hartford at the First Church of Christ and the Ancient Burying Ground
- Occupations: Puritan minister, Innskeeper
- Known for: Proprietor and founder of Hartford, Connecticut

Jeremy Adams, also known as Jeremiah Adams (c.1604/5—August 11, 1683), was one of the first settlers of Hartford, Connecticut. He was also the founder and first proprietor of Colchester, Connecticut, which was established on land owned by Adams, known as "Jeremiah's Farme".

== Arrival in America ==
Adams arrived in America in 1633, first arriving in New England at Braintree, Massachusetts—he was one of the original members of the company that came to the colonies with Rev. Thomas Hooker, probably arriving with Hooker in 1633. He became a freeman in Cambridge, Massachusetts in 1635. In 1636, he moved with Rev. Hooker to Hartford, Connecticut, and was one of the original proprietors of the settlement.

In June 1636, Thomas Hooker and one hundred members of his Puritan congregation, including Jeremy Adams, left the safety of the Boston area and began a two-week overland journey. They traveled a trail long used by Native Americans, later known as the Connecticut Path or the Bay Path, west to the Connecticut River and then south to the future site of Hartford.

In 1639 Adams was the constable (cunstable), and the official Innkeeper for the Colony. His Inn at Hartford was used as the meeting place for the legislative body of the colony, general court sessions, and for other public purposes. The Inn was said to have been "frequented by all of the great men of the colony". It may be presumed that among these meetings, was the creation of the famous Fundamental Orders of Connecticut (1639), which was perhaps the western world's first written constitution. The constitution was later hidden in the Charter Oak.

On April 5, 1638, he was sent with Captain Mason on an expedition to the Warranocke Indians to trade for corn. This service qualifies his descendants to become members of the General Society of Colonial Wars. He was: an Officer of the Court, a Tax Assessor, a collector for the town, a Juror, a Collector of Customs and traded with the Indians for the General Court of Connecticut. In 1660, he was the only resident of the colony allowed to sell wine or liquor.

Some of the land he owned is now occupied by buildings of Harvard University, and another tract of land is now a part of the Campus of Trinity College, Hartford.

== Tributes ==
A ridge named Jeremy's Back and a river called Jeremy's River are located near Colchester, Connecticut, and are both named after Jeremy Adams. His name is inscribed on the Founders Monument of Hartford at the First Church of Christ and the Ancient Burying Ground.
