= Washington Avenue Bridge (Waterbury, Connecticut) =

- U.S. National Register of Historic Places
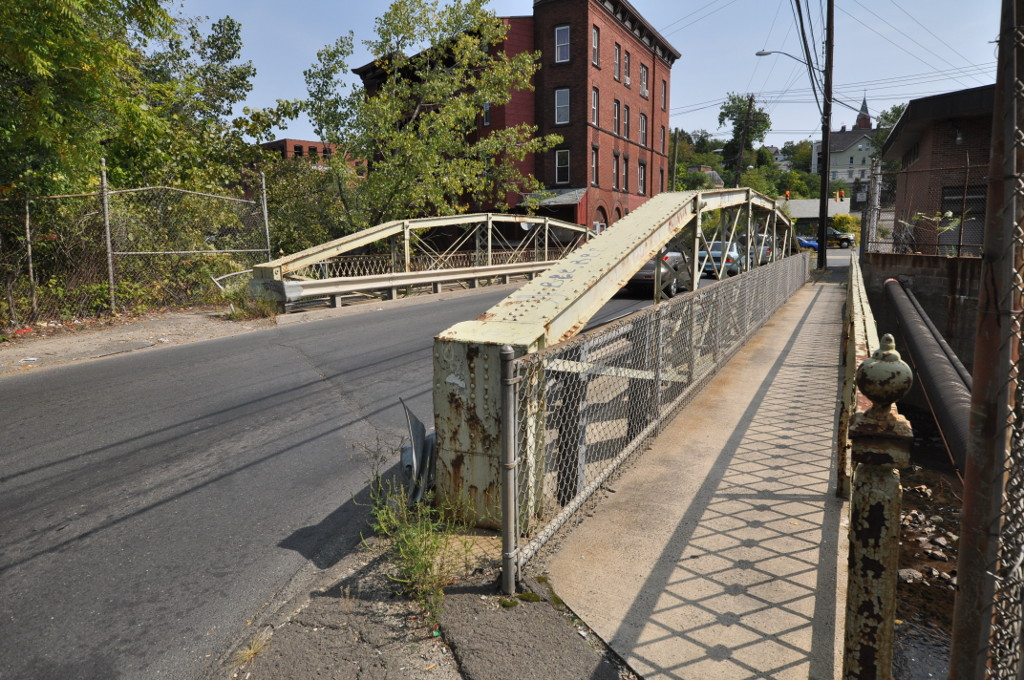

- Location within Connecticut Location within the United States
- Location: Washington Avenue over the Mad River, Waterbury, Connecticut
- Coordinates: 41°32′38″N 73°02′18″W
- Area: less than one acre
- Built: 1881
- Architect: Corrugated Metal Co.
- Architectural style: Lenticular pony truss
- NRHP reference No.: 01000354
- Added to NRHP: April 12, 2001

The Washington Avenue Bridge is a historic lenticular truss bridge carrying Washington Avenue over the Mad River in Waterbury, Connecticut. Built in 1881, it is the oldest known surviving example of a lenticular pony truss bridge built by the Corrugated Metal Company, later known as the Berlin Iron Bridge Company, a prolific bridge maker in New England of the late 19th century. The bridge was listed on the National Register of Historic Places in 2001.

== Description and history ==
The Washington Avenue Bridge stands in a busy industrial and commercial area south of downtown Waterbury, carrying Washington Avenue over the Mad River just west of South Main Street. The bridge is oriented east-west while the river flows from northeast to southwest, resulting in an offset of the trusses which historically supported its weight. The trusses are lenticular pony trusses fabricated out of wrought iron, with pinned connections and decorative finials atop the posts supporting the truss ends. The trusses are 70 feet (21 m) long and have a maximum depth of 10 feet (3.0 m). The bridge deck is 24 feet (7.3 m) wide, and is about 8 feet (2.4 m) above the typical river level. The deck is now supported by steel beams inserted underneath the decking; steel beams also supported the sidewalks set outside the trusses.

The bridge was built in 1881 by the Corrugated Metal Company, which was later renamed to its better-known name, the Berlin Iron Bridge Company. This bridge is the earliest known example of the company's distinctive lenticular trusses, and embodies construction materials and methods (wrought iron and pinned connections in particular) which went completely out of use by the end of the 19th century. By that time, bridge designs had also largely been standardized, and lenticular trusses were no longer normally built. This bridge is also unusual among surviving lenticular truss bridges in its urban setting, and the survival of some of its decorative features, which were rarely placed on bridges in rural settings.

== See also ==
- National Register of Historic Places listings in New Haven County, Connecticut
- List of bridges on the National Register of Historic Places in Connecticut
