= Bridge No. 455 =

- U.S. National Register of Historic Places
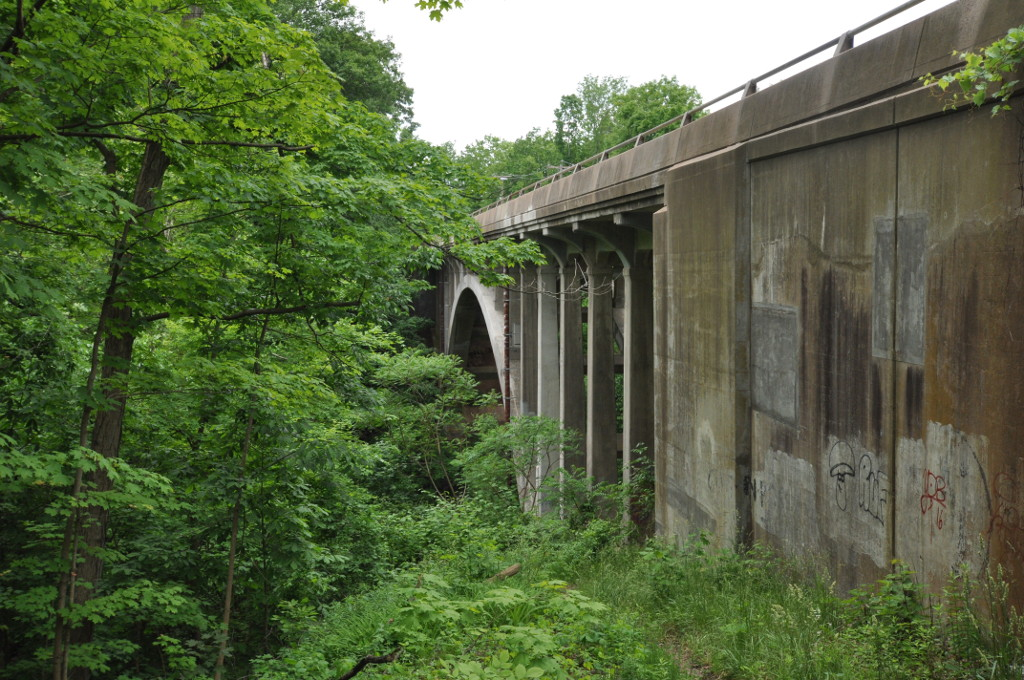

- Location within Connecticut Location within the United States
- Location: CT 159 at Stony Brook, Suffield, Connecticut
- Coordinates: 41°57′30″N 72°37′40″W
- Area: less than one acre
- Built: 1929
- Built by: Connecticut Highway Department
- Architectural style: open-spandrel concrete arch
- NRHP reference No.: 04001094
- Added to NRHP: September 29, 2004

Bridge No. 455 is a historic open spandrel concrete bridge, carrying Connecticut Route 159 across Stony Brook in southern Suffield, Connecticut. Completed in 1929, it is one of six surviving open spandrel concrete bridges in the state. It was listed on the National Register of Historic Places in 2004.

== Description and history ==
Bridge No. 455 is located in southeastern Suffield, carrying Connecticut Route 159 across Stony Brook. Route 159 is the major north–south route through eastern Suffield, running roughly parallel to the Connecticut River. The bridge is set across a steep and rocky ravine. It is 259 feet (79 m) long, with a main span measuring 132 feet (40 m), and nine concrete girder approach spans. The main span is an open spandrel structure of reinforced concrete, whose arch has a rise of 34 feet (10 m). The bridge deck is 55 feet (17 m) above the typical water level of the stream below. The arch ribs are 4 feet (1.2 m) thick at the base and 2.5 feet (0.76 m) at the apex, and are joined to the bridge deck by a series of tapered square columns. The roadway is two lanes wide.

The bridge was completed in 1929 as part of a major initiative by the state Department of Transportation to improve the infrastructure of its main highways. At the time Route 159 was the principal north–south route between Hartford and Springfield, Massachusetts, and is still a major secondary road, having been supplanted by Interstate 91 for most traffic. The state used open spandrel structures over ravines and for exceptionally long spans, where significant cost savings were achieved by reducing materials costs. The state also declared a preference for the bridges for their aesthetics, and used them with some frequency. There are now only six such bridges left in the state.

== See also ==
- National Register of Historic Places listings in Hartford County, Connecticut
- List of bridges on the National Register of Historic Places in Connecticut
