= Ashland Mill Bridge =

- Formerly listed on the U.S. National Register of Historic Places
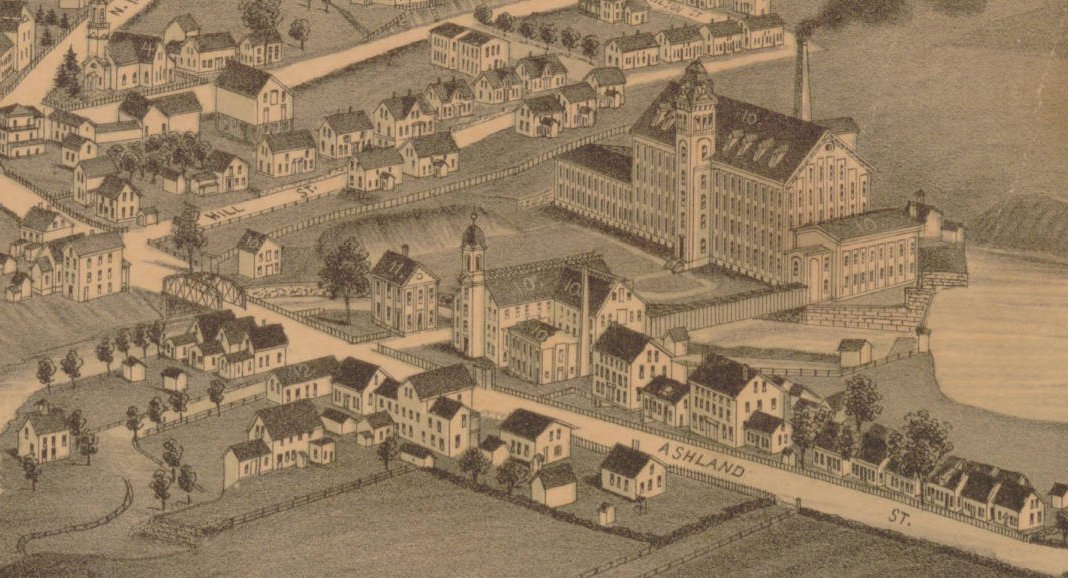
- A map showing a birds-eye view of the Ashland Mill area, with the bridge on the left side of the image.

- Location within Connecticut Location within the United States
- Location: Over Pachaug River, near Ashland Street, Griswold, Connecticut, United States
- Coordinates: 41°36′19.9″N 71°58′41.1″W
- Built: 1886
- Architect: Berlin Iron Bridge Company
- Architectural style: Lenticular pony Truss
- NRHP reference No.: 99000407

Significant dates
- Added to NRHP: April 1, 1999
- Removed from NRHP: February 2, 2016

The Ashland Mill Bridge was a lenticular pony truss bridge over the Pachaug River in Griswold, Connecticut that was built in 1886 by the Berlin Iron Bridge Company. It was built following the Ashland dam break of February 1886 which washed away the previous bridges. The bridge served the millyard of the Ashland Cotton Company, in the Jewett City section of Griswold. The bridge was 65 feet (20 m) long and crossed a millrace on a skew angle. The Ashland Mill was damaged by arson in March 1995 and subsequently torn down, but the bridge itself remained. By 1999, the town deemed the bridge unsafe and closed it, and by February 1999, the bridge was moved to a vacant parking lot and was replaced with a new bridge. The bridge was added to the state of Connecticut historic register and it was later added to the National Register of Historic Places in April 1999. It was removed from the National Register in February 2016.

== Construction ==
Heavy rains in February 1886 caused the Ashland dam to break and the resulting flood damaged the Ashland Cotton Company's buildings and washed away the previous bridges at the site. The Berlin Iron Bridge Company was contracted to build a total of three bridges in the area, the Ashland Mill Bridge, another larger lenticular truss for Ashland Street and another 33 feet (10 m) bridge for the Slater mill which was located further downstream. Clouette and Tinh note that the mill owners may have been influenced in their decision by the Berlin Iron Bridge Company's bridges that were already in place in the surrounding area.

The Ashland Mill Bridge was a single-span lenticular pony truss bridge. Completed in 1886, it was a roadway from Ashland Street to the millyard. The bridge was made of four 16 feet (4.9 m) long panels, totaling 65 feet (20 m) in length. The roadway was 10 feet (3.0 m) wide. The bridge's wrought-iron truss was 6.5 feet (2.0 m) deep and it crossed the river at a 28° angle. All but the truss's joints were pinned except for the endposts' lower-chord nut connections; as was distinctive of the Berlin Iron Bridge Company's bridges. The plate-girder floor beams supported wooden stringers and floored with planks across the width of the bridge. The bridge's railing were made of two 5/8-inch (1.5875 cm) rods bolted to the inside of the trusses. A 1905 postcard depicts the bridge being painted red, but the paint was nearly absent by 1998.

== Fate ==
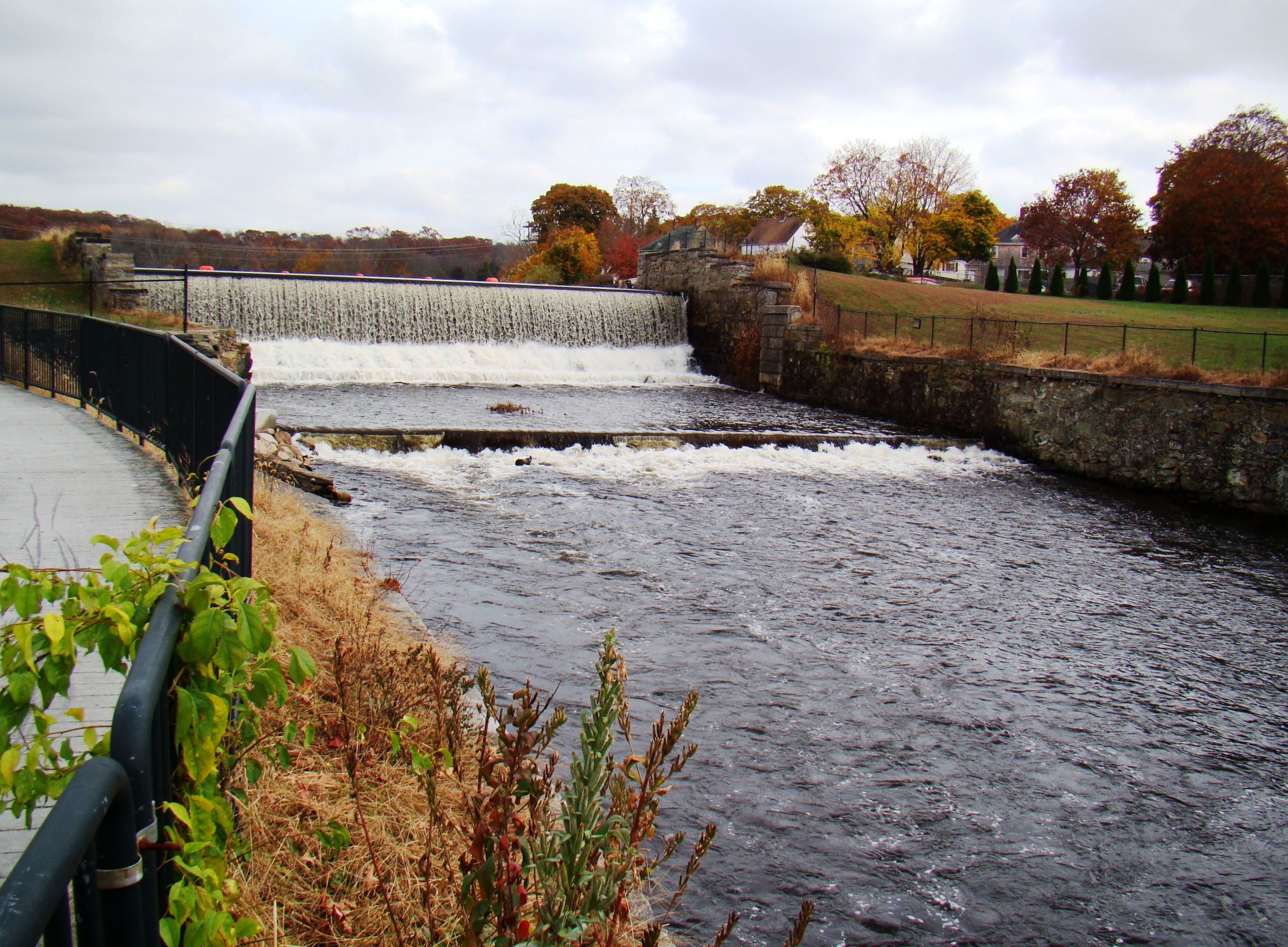
Pachaug River millrace at Ashland Mill

In March 1995, the manufacturing buildings were damaged by arson and were subsequently demolished. The site became a town park and the bridge was anticipated to be rehabilitated and serve as a pedestrian bridge in the park. The bridge was listed on the National Register of Historic Places in April 1999 for being a historically significant example of late 19th-century bridge fabrication and as a surviving example of a bridge built by the Berlin Iron Bridge Company without significant modification or deterioration. It was also locally significant as a remaining artefact of the Ashland Cotton Company, formerly a major employer in the city.

In 1999, the town closed the bridge as it was deemed unsafe and badly deteriorated. It was estimated that $72,000 would be needed to relocate the bridge. In February 1999, an eight-member committee was tasked with planning a municipal park on the site. First Selectman Paul Brycki, hoped that the pending nomination to the National Register of Historic Places would help obtain grant money to repair the bridge. Prior to February 1999, the historic bridge was moved to a vacant parking lot near the town hall and a replacement bridge was installed. The bridge was also on the state of Connecticut's historic register list.

== See also ==
- National Register of Historic Places listings in New London County, Connecticut
- List of bridges on the National Register of Historic Places in Connecticut

== Notes ==
- The date of the fire which destroyed the Ashland Mill occurred in 1995 and not in 1994 as sometimes erroneously reported.
