= Pachaug River =

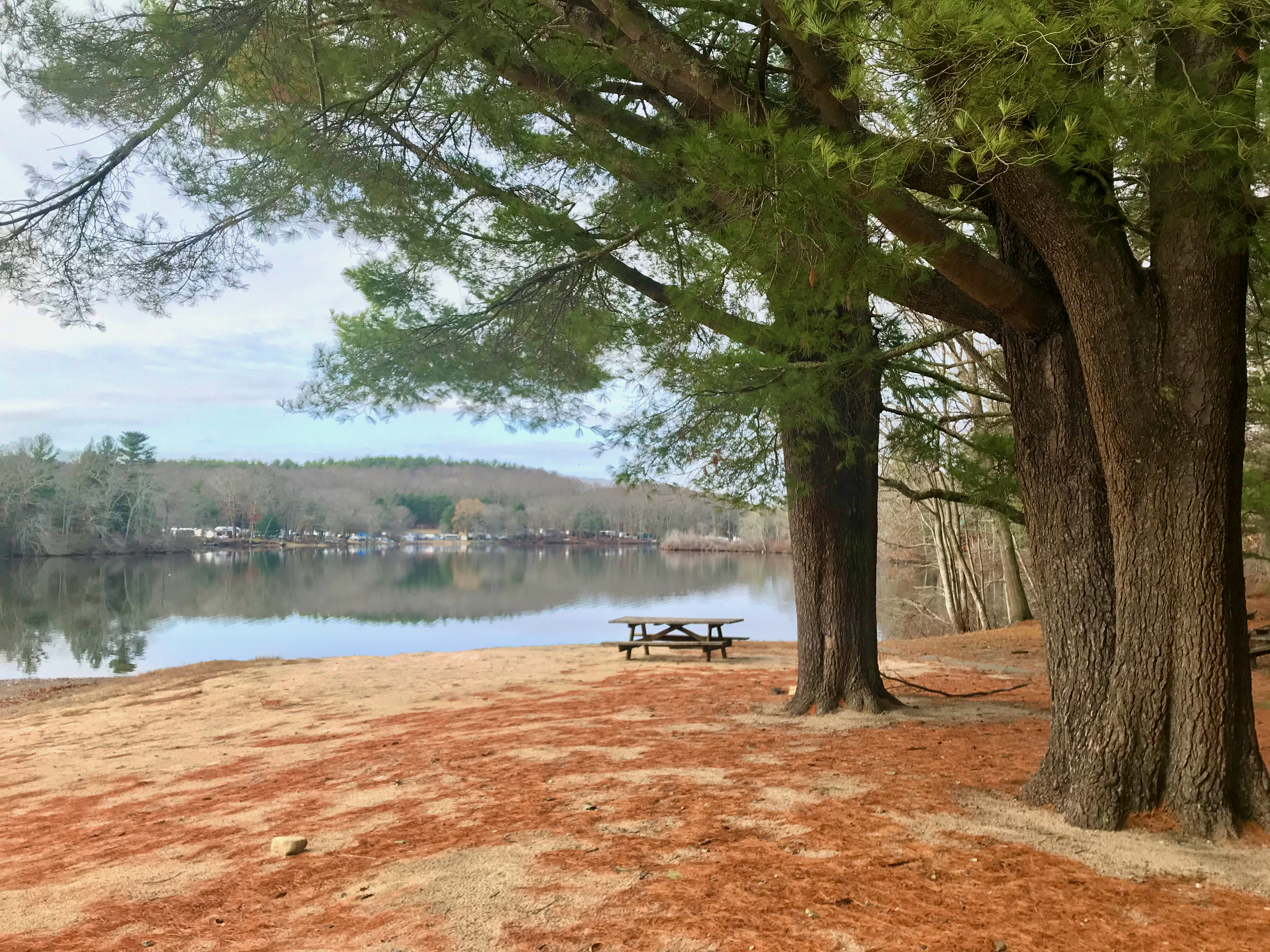
- The public beach at Hopeville Pond in Hopeville Pond State Park in Griswold, Connecticut.

Location
- Country: United States
- State: Connecticut
- Counties: New London, CT

Physical characteristics
- Source: Beach Pond 41.591471°N 71.786412°W
  - location: Exeter, Washington County, Rhode Island, United States
- Mouth: Empties into Quinebaug River 41.6050°N 71.9802°W
  - location: Jewett City, New London County, Connecticut, United States
- Length: 16.0 mi (25.7 km)
- Discharge
  - location: Jewett City, CT

The Pachaug River is a 16-mile-long (26 km) river arising from the Pachaug State Forest at the Connecticut - Rhode Island border and draining into the Quinebaug River. It is crossed by the Ashland Mill Bridge in Griswold, Connecticut, a bridge which is listed on the U.S. National Register of Historic Places.

== History ==
The Pachaug River was used by the Mohegan Indians, who constructed stone weirs to direct the water flow and funnel fish to the center of the stream for trapping.

In 1974 and 1977, a fishing advisory said it was in good to excellent fishing location.

In the 1970s, a plan was drawn up to pump 7.5 million gallons of water a day from the river into the Rattlesnake Brook, which in turn would feed the Broad Brook.

== Locations ==
=== Hopeville Pond ===
Hopeville Pond is a three-mile impoundment and widening of the Pachaug River in Hopeville Pond State Park in the "lost" village of Hopeville in the town of Griswold (much of the village was flooded by the creation of Hopeville Pond by a dam built to generate electricity). It has a public beach, kayak/canoe boat launch as well as camping and picnic facilities.

=== Other Impoundments ===
Ashland Pond in the borough of Jewett City is another impoundment of the Pachaug River, one closer to the merger with the Quinebaug River.

Glasgo Pond, Doaneville Pond and Pachaug Pond are additional impoundments of the Pachaug River in the villages of Glasgo, Doaneville and Pachaug in the town of Griswold, Connecticut.

Sawmill Pond, Beachdale Pond, and Still Waters Pond are additional impoundments of the river in the town of Voluntown, Connecticut.

The source of the Pachaug River is a small "stream-like" section in Exeter, Rhode Island north of and draining into Beach Pond, a large impoundment split between Voluntown, Connecticut and Exeter, Rhode Island.

== See also ==
- List of rivers of Connecticut
- List of rivers of Rhode Island
