= Avery House (Griswold, Connecticut) =

Historic house in Connecticut

- U.S. National Register of Historic Places
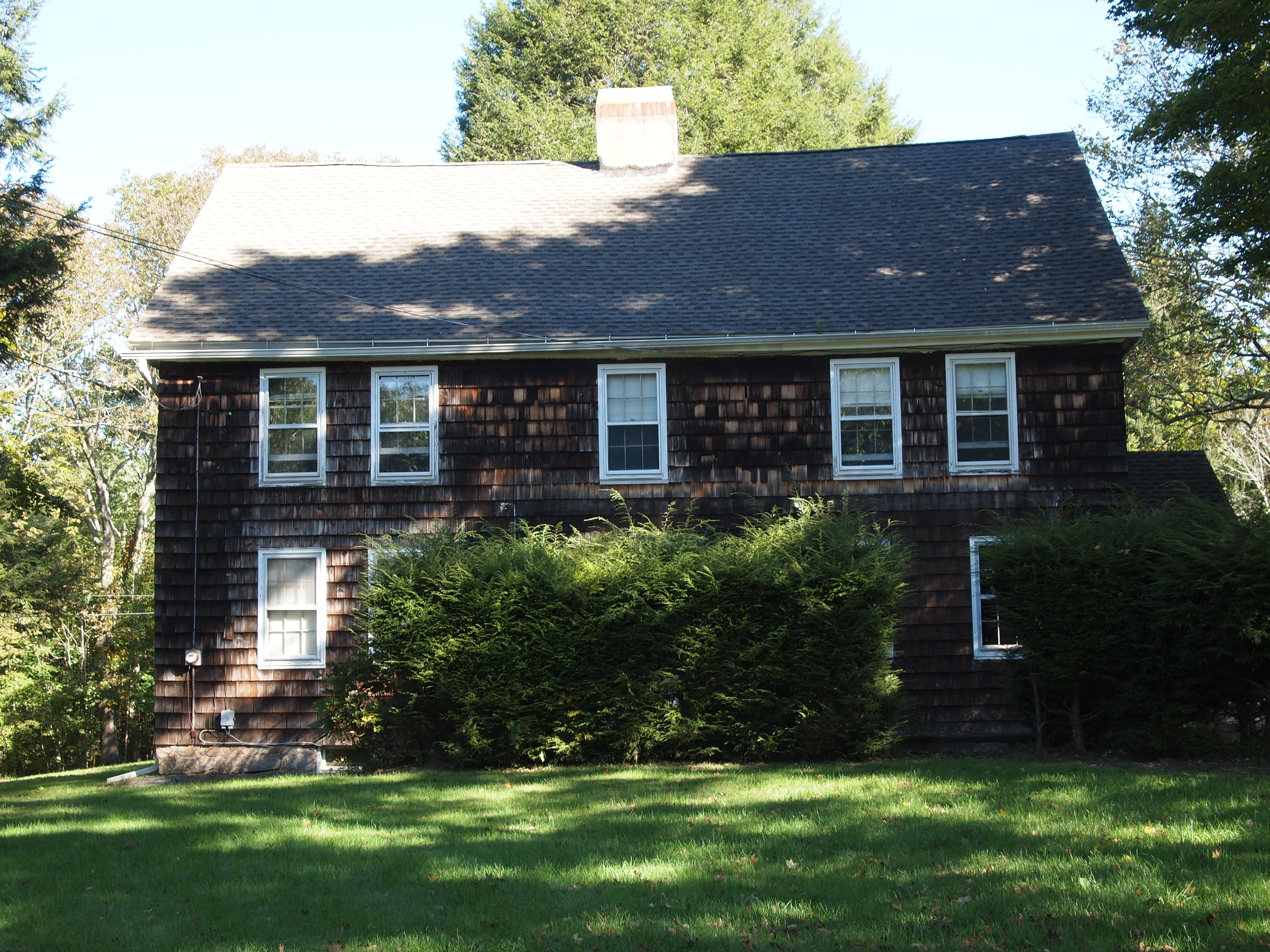

- Location within Connecticut Location within the United States
- Location: Northeastern corner of Park and Roode Roads, Griswold, Connecticut
- Coordinates: 41°36′28″N 71°54′50″W
- Area: 6.5 acres (2.6 ha)
- Built: Circa 1770
- Architectural style: Colonial
- MPS: Connecticut State Park and Forest Depression-Era Federal Work Relief Programs Structures TR
- NRHP reference No.: 86001726
- Added to NRHP: September 4, 1986

Avery House, also known as Hopeville Pond Park House, was built around 1770 in Griswold, Connecticut. It is a 20 feet (6.1 m) by 40 feet (12 m), two-story, central-chimney Colonial that was originally sheathed in clapboard and topped with a gable roof. The chimney is on a stone base and has a built-in root cellar. Alterations in the house changed the traditional five-room first floor plan by eliminating the keeping rooms and the kitchen fireplace. It retains many of its original door frames and wrought-iron latch hardware. The Avery House became the Hopeville Park manager's residence and is a part of Hopeville Pond State Park. It was listed on the National Register of Historic Places in 1986.

== Construction ==
The architect and construction date are unknown. The National Register of Historic Places nomination dates it to around 1770, which is substantiated by the construction and interior woodwork. The two-story house is a central-chimney Colonial measuring approximately 20 feet (6.1 m) by 40 feet (12 m). It was originally sheathed in clapboard and topped with a gable roof. The central chimney is on a stone base and has a built-in root cellar. At the time of its nomination, the house was using asphalt shingles on its roof.

The house is historically significant for its bolection molding around fireplaces and shallow molded shelves above the fireplaces in the front chambers. The fireplace in the east room has a large single over-mantel panel, and the west fireplace has two panels. Mary McMahon prepared the inventory form for the National Register of Historic Places, and she writes that "a handsome corner cabinet with butterfly shelves is also located in the east room". The second floor retains its original flooring and mantels, and the post and beam construction is visible throughout the interior.

Alterations in the house changed the traditional five-room first floor plan by eliminating the keeping rooms and the kitchen fireplace. Despite this, the house's original door frames and wrought-iron latch hardware remained by the time of its nomination in 1985.

In 1935, the Civilian Conservation Corps (CCC) rehabilitated the property for park use. The State of Connecticut acquired the house in 1938. The CCC shingled the exterior, and they might have added the porch which McMahon deems to be "inappropriate". McMahon also posits that the CCC added the garage and workshop.

== Owners ==
The owners of the house are unknown, but two records do exist. The 1854 Baker map of New London lists a Captain J. Avery as the owner, and an 1868 map lists an H. Bennett. The Avery House became the Hopeville Park manager's residence after it was rehabilitated.

== Importance ==
The Avery House was listed on the National Register of Historic Places in 1986. It is considered historically significant as an example of a well-preserved house that does not have its historical integrity degraded by alterations. McMahon writes that "the interior paneling is the finest in any 18th-century house" owned by the Connecticut Department of Environmental Protection. The house was originally set to have the surrounding 400 feet (120 m) as part of its designation, but this was changed to 300 feet (91 m) because it would not affect the historic setting.

== See also ==
- National Register of Historic Places listings in New London County, Connecticut
