= Samson Occom Bridge =

- Bridge No. 1860
- U.S. National Register of Historic Places
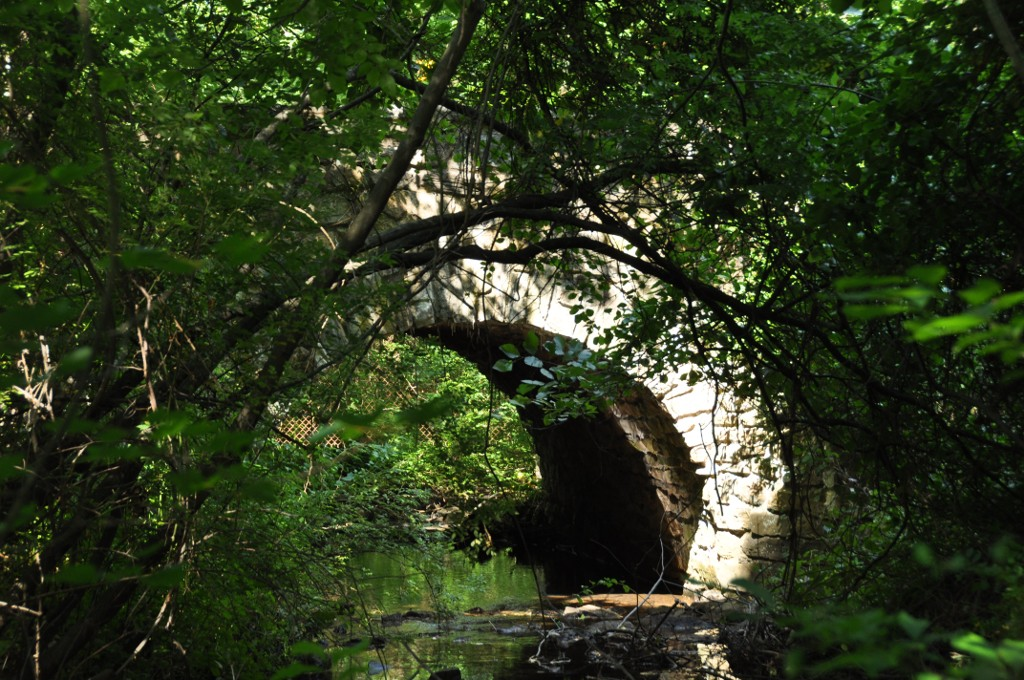

- Location within Connecticut Location within the United States
- Location: Massapeag Side Road (Route 433) over Shantok Brook, Montville, Connecticut
- Coordinates: 41°28′48″N 72°5′12″W
- Area: less than one acre
- Built: 1936
- Architectural style: Vernacular, Rustic
- MPS: Connecticut State Park and Forest Depression-Era Federal Work Relief Programs Structures TR
- NRHP reference No.: 93000644
- Added to NRHP: July 29, 1993

Bridge No. 1860, also known as the Samson Occom Bridge, is a fieldstone arch bridge in Montville, Connecticut. It was constructed by the Connecticut State Highway Department in 1936 as a Works Progress Administration project, and is located on Mohegan tribal land in an area that was once a part of Fort Shantok State Park. The bridge carries traffic from Massapeag Side Road (Special Service Road 433) over the Shantok Brook, a tributary of the Thames River. It spans 12 feet (3.7 m) across the brook, and its arch rises about 6 feet (1.8 m) above the water. It carries 1,100 vehicles per day according to a 2011 Connecticut Department of Transportation report. Samson Occom Bridge was listed on the National Register of Historic Places in 1993.

== Design ==
The bridge is commonly known as the "Samson Occom Bridge", although it is officially referred to as Bridge Number 1860 in state records. There is a wooden sign on the south end of the bridge which states that it is the "Site of the Samson Occum Bridge", commemorating Christian educator Samson Occom, a colonial-period Mohegan from Montville, Connecticut.

The stone arch bridge spans 12 feet (3.7 m) across the Shantok Brook, with its arch about 6 feet (1.8 m) over the water. It was built in 1936 by the Works Progress Administration and is constructed of medium-sized fieldstone laid in cement mortar. The semi-circular arch is constructed with a ring of stones, each about 18 inches (46 cm) deep. It was built up by "rubble construction" and is made of fieldstone, including the wing walls. The spandrels of the bridge rise above the 16 feet (4.9 m) roadway and form low parapets with ramped ends. The bridge is about 20 feet (6.1 m) long, including the railings.

== Preservation ==
In May 1991, the Connecticut Historic Bridge Inventory plan outlined a plan for the preservation of the Samson Occom Bridge. It is unlikely that traffic would require replacement or modification of the bridge in the foreseeable future. According to a 2011 Connecticut Department of Transportation report, the bridge carries 1,100 vehicles per day. The biggest threat to the bridge is moisture control and the repair of eroded surfaces. Stone arch bridges rarely require structural rehabilitation, but an alternative solution to structural rehabilitation would be to use concrete slab embedded above the arch, only requiring raising the roadway. The report stated that the "rustic quality" of the bridge is not compatible with roadways larger than two lanes, but that additional width could be facilitated without compromising its historical significance.

== Importance ==
The National Register of Historic Places nomination states that the Samson Occum Bridge is significant as an example of the 1930s public works programs and as an example of "the picturesque park architecture of the early 20th century." It was constructed at a time when cobblestone masonry was a popular choice for state park structures, but also after masonry was considered an obsolete building material. The bridge has added significance as an example of the work conducted by the federal Works Progress Administration.

== See also ==
- National Register of Historic Places listings in New London County, Connecticut
- List of bridges on the National Register of Historic Places in Connecticut
