= Farmington River Railroad Bridge =

- U.S. National Register of Historic Places
- An Amtrak Hartford Line train on the bridge in 2026

- Location within Connecticut Location within the United States
- Location: Spans Farmington River and Pleasant Street west of Palisado Avenue, Windsor, Connecticut
- Coordinates: 41°51′28″N 72°38′30″W
- Built: 1867
- NRHP reference No.: 72001334
- Added to NRHP: August 25, 1972

The Farmington River Railroad Bridge spans the Farmington River in Windsor, Connecticut, just west of Palisado Avenue and north of Pleasant Street. It carries two tracks of the main railroad line between Hartford, Connecticut and Springfield, Massachusetts. Built in 1867, it is one of the state's finest examples of a stone arch railroad bridge. It was listed on the National Register of Historic Places in 1972.

== Description and history ==
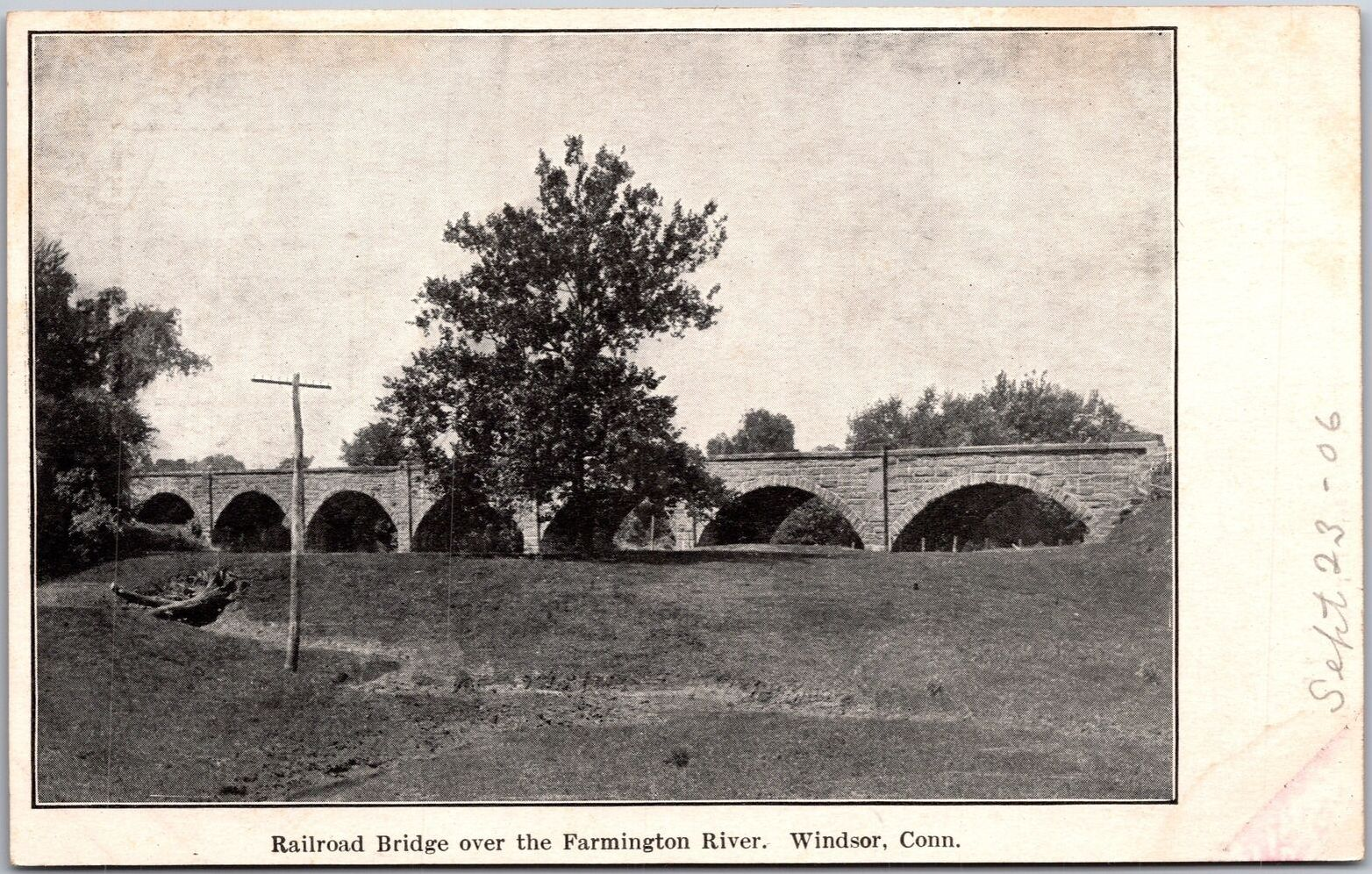
1900s postcard of the bridge

The Farmington River Railroad Bridge is located north of the village center of Windsor, spanning the east-flowing Farmington River in a north–south direction, just north of Pleasant Street. It is a masonry structure 464 feet (141 m) long, built out of locally quarried sandstone, with seven arches mounted on piers and abutments of similar stone. The stone is formed into dressed rectangular blocks of varying sizes. The sides of the piers are articulated as pilasters, with a captstone set on a stone balustrade over each one. The upstream sides of the piers have triangular projections to minimize damage caused by ice floes.

The bridge was built in 1867 by the Hartford and New Haven Railroad, and has carried the main line between Hartford and Springfield since then. This is particularly noteworthy, because the weight and force of modern trains is substantially greater than those at the time of its construction. The bridge was designed to allow for the transit of barges beneath it on the river.

== See also ==
- National Register of Historic Places listings in Windsor, Connecticut
- List of bridges on the National Register of Historic Places in Connecticut
