= Skilton Road Bridge =

- U.S. National Register of Historic Places
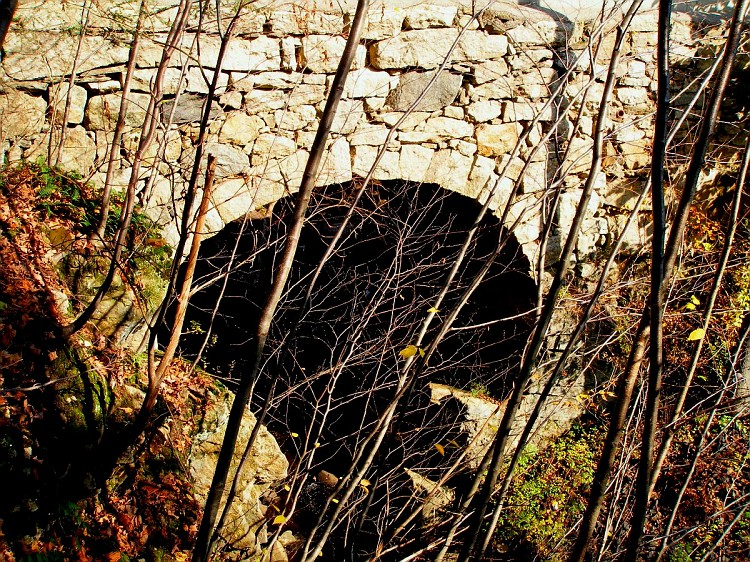

- Location within Connecticut Location within the United States
- Location: Skilton Road over the Nonewaug River, Watertown, Connecticut
- Coordinates: 41°37′45″N 73°9′33″W
- Area: less than one acre
- Built: 1865
- Architectural style: Masonry-arch bridge
- NRHP reference No.: 91001744
- Added to NRHP: December 10, 1991

The Skilton Road Bridge is a historic stone arch bridge, carrying Skilton Road across the Nonewaug River in Northwestern Watertown, Connecticut. The bridge was built in 1865–66, and is a rare well-preserved example of a mid-19th century stone bridge. It was listed on the National Register of Historic Places in 1991.

== Description and history ==
The Skilton Road Bridge is located in a rural-residential area of Northwestern Watertown, spanning the Nonewaug River between Hinman Road and Hickory Lane. The bridge has an overall length of 35 feet (11 m), with a single arch spanning 20 feet (6.1 m). It is made of dry laid local stone, and is built on a stone ledge on one side and a stone abutment on the other. The stones which form the barrel of the arch are roughly worked, while those filling the spandrels show little evidence of work. The arch is a slightly asymmetrical segmented arch, probably due to the difficulties involved in working at the site. The bridge is 16 feet (4.9 m) wide, and carries a single lane of traffic.

The bridge was built either in 1865–66, after the town voted in 1865 to fund its construction; Skilton Road was at the time the major route between Watertown and Bethlehem. Stone, a more expensive construction material than wood, was probably chosen because of its longer lifespan, and because a mill dam just upstream (now breached) whose breach would have caused flooding that would endanger a wooden bridge. This bridge is fairly typical of mid-19th century stone bridges, which were once quite numerous in the state.

== See also ==
- National Register of Historic Places listings in Litchfield County, Connecticut
- List of bridges on the National Register of Historic Places in Connecticut
