= Hopeville Pond State Park =

Park in Griswold, Connecticut

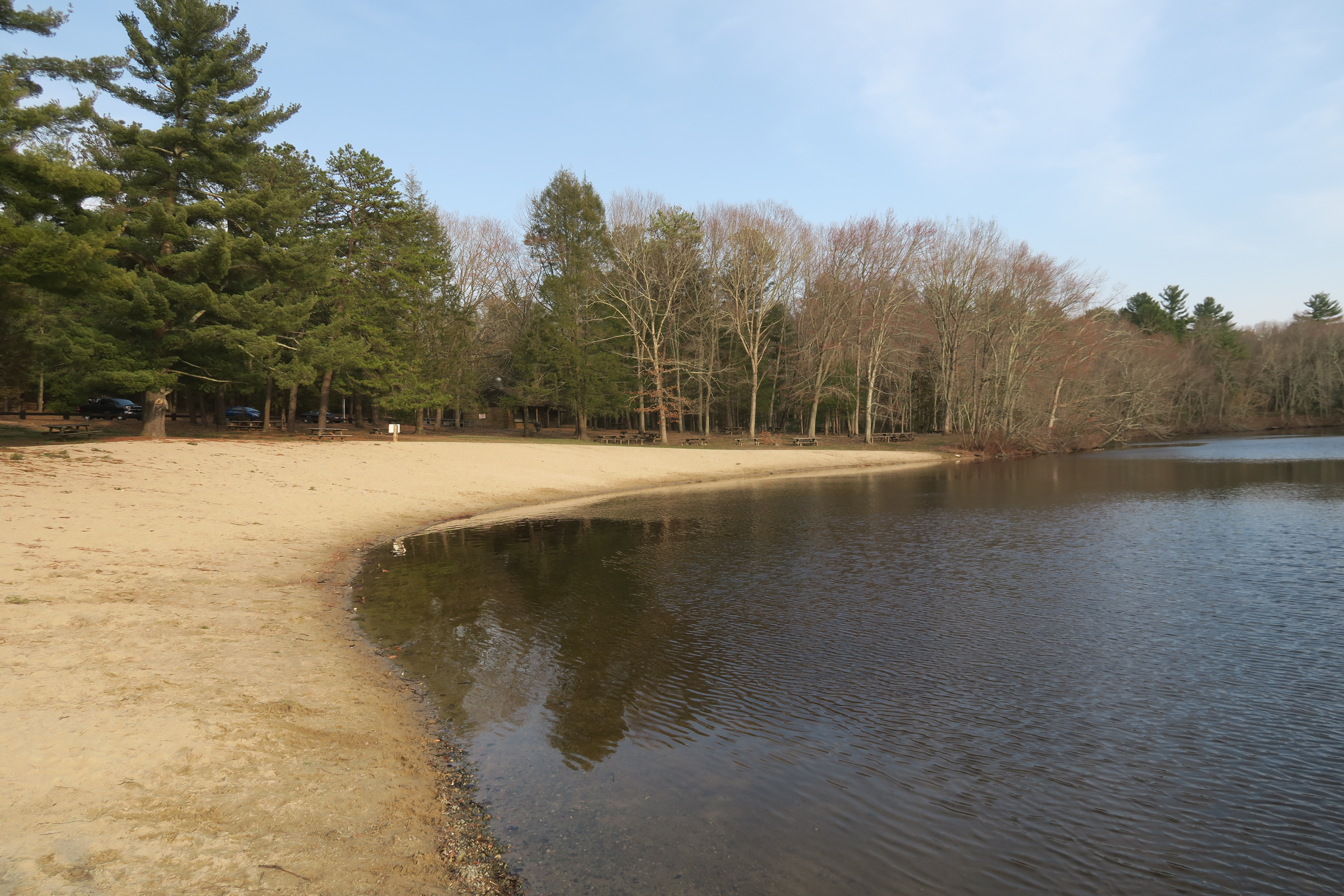

- Location within Connecticut Location within the United States
- Location: Griswold, Connecticut, United States
- Coordinates: 41°36′27″N 71°55′08″W
- Area: 554 acres (224 ha)
- Elevation: 144 ft (44 m)
- Established: 1938
- Administrator: Connecticut Department of Energy and Environmental Protection
- Designation: Connecticut state park
- Website: Official website

Hopeville Pond State Park is a public recreation area located on Hopeville Pond, an impoundment of the Pachaug River in Griswold, Connecticut. A portion of the 554-acre (224 ha) state park occupies the site of the lost village of Hopeville. The park manager's house is the Avery House, which is listed on the National Register of Historic Places. The park offers fishing, swimming, camping, and trails for hiking and biking. It is managed by the Connecticut Department of Energy and Environmental Protection.

== History ==
The Mohegan people constructed stone weirs to harvest fish from the Pachaug River which directed water flow and fish to the center of the stream for easy capture in fishing baskets. In 1711, Stephen Gates was granted 14 acres of land in the area, and he constructed a gristmill and a sawmill, along with the waterfall on the Pachaug River. In 1818, Elizah Abel added a woolen mill to the site. John Slater purchased the three mills and constructed a satinet mill which he named the "Hope Mill," which gave its name to the village, pond, and state park.

By 1840, Hopeville was a "thriving village" according to Daniel L. Phillips, author of Griswold - a history. On November 4, 1850, a meeting was held{ to discuss building a church. A church was erected for $1,700 and dedicated on December 12, 1852. The village of Hopeville reached its peak in 1860 and was well known for its production of woolens. The mill was owned in 1881 by Edwin Lanthrop and Company when it was destroyed in a fire and not rebuilt. The Ashland Cotton Company later acquired the property. The church and four houses also burned in 1900. The original gristmill from 1711 was also destroyed by fire in 1908. Sometime before 1917, the Ashland Cotton Company erected a dam on the site and created the 145 acre reservoir; the dam was used to generate electrical power for its mills in Jewett City.

=== Avery House ===
The Avery House, also known as Hopeville Pond Park House, is a 20 feet (6.1 m) by 40 feet (12 m) two-story Colonial with a central chimney dating to around 1770. The chimney is on a stone base and has a built-in root cellar. In 1935, the Civilian Conservation Corps (CCC) rehabilitated the property for park use. The alterations in the house changed the traditional five-room first-floor plan by eliminating the keeping rooms and the kitchen fireplace. It retains many of its original door frames and wrought-iron latch hardware. The Avery House became the Hopeville Park manager's residence after it was rehabilitated. It was listed on the National Register of Historic Places in 1986.

Park

The Civilian Conservation Corps developed the state park in the 1930s. Their efforts included adapting the Avery House for park use. Hopeville Pond was designated as a state park in 1938.

== Activities ==
The park's recreational activities include biking, hiking, camping, fishing, boating, and swimming. The park's campground features 80 campsites. Fish found in 137-acre (55 ha) Hopeville Pond include channel catfish, northern pike, largemouth bass, chain pickerel, and yellow perch.

Hopeville Pond was included in an 11-mile bike trail in Connecticut: Rides for the Casual Cyclist. The Lake Lubbers website states that Hopeville Pond is a popular location for fishing, including ice fishing. The reported fish include "northern pike, largemouth bass, smallmouth bass, catfish, chain pickerel, yellow perch, and bluegill". The park's camp site received a positive mention in 2013 in Best Tent Camping: New England.
