= Pequabuck Bridge =

- U.S. National Register of Historic Places
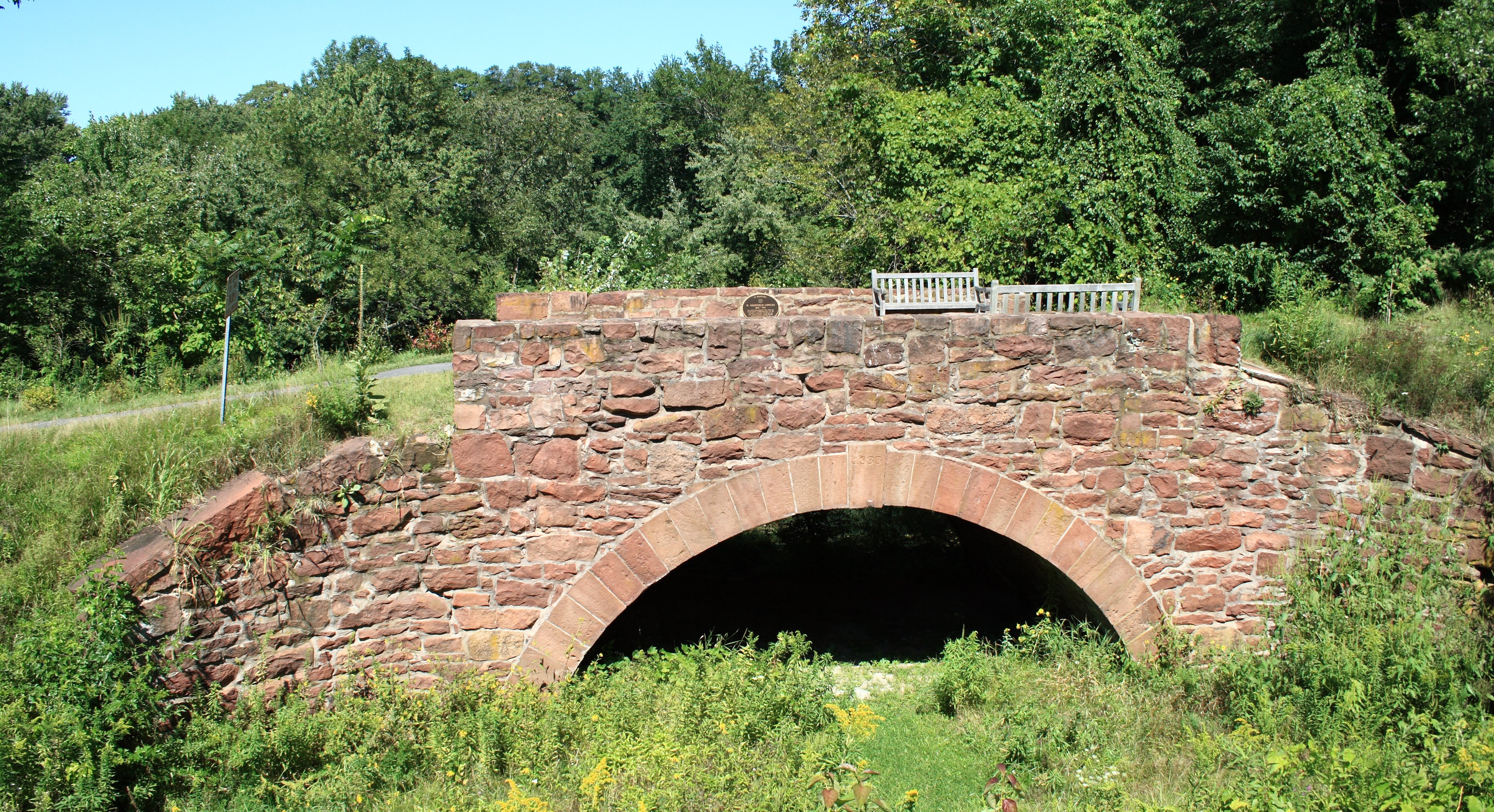

- Location within Connecticut Location within the United States
- Location: Meadow Road at Pequabuck River, Farmington, Connecticut
- Coordinates: 41°43′0.1″N 72°50′23.2″W
- Area: less than one acre
- Built: 1832–1833
- NRHP reference No.: 84001049
- Added to NRHP: July 19, 1984

The Pequabuck Bridge is a historic stone arch bridge, carrying a paved multiuse trail across the Pequabuck River in Farmington, Connecticut. Built in 1833, the bridge formerly carried the adjacent Meadow Road. It is one of the state's only surviving early 19th-century stone arch bridges and was listed on the National Register of Historic Places in 1984.

== Description and history ==
The Pequabuck Bridge is located in central southern Farmington, and is set just north of the modern Meadow Road crossing of the Pequabuck River, a tributary of the Farmington River. It now crosses over an occasionally wet channel that the river formerly occupied; the river was rerouted to the east with the construction of the modern road bridge. This bridge has a single stone arch, with a span of 22 feet (6.7 m) and a height of 11 feet (3.4 m). It is built mainly out of brownstone rubble, which is the major element of its abutments, spandrels, wing walls, and parapets. The arch itself is shaped out of finished brownstone voussoirs. The bridge is about 20 feet (6.1 m) wide, and its arch is topped by earth fill and a paved surface that now carries pedestrian and bicycle traffic.

The bridge was built in 1832-33, and originally carried the traffic of Meadow Road. It is unusual within the state at that time for a town to construct a stone bridge, given the expense; this one was funded in part by the operators of the Farmington Canal. It replaced an 1819 wooden bridge, which was laboring under heavy usage. The town specified that an embankment connect this bridge to that on which the road crossed the canal, and that it be built at the same height as the canal bridge. The canal bridge has not survived, and only traces of the embankment now survive. The bridge remained in service as a road bridge until the second half of the 20th century.

== See also ==
- National Register of Historic Places listings in Hartford County, Connecticut
- List of bridges on the National Register of Historic Places in Connecticut
