= Stone Bridge (Hartford, Connecticut) =

- U.S. National Register of Historic Places
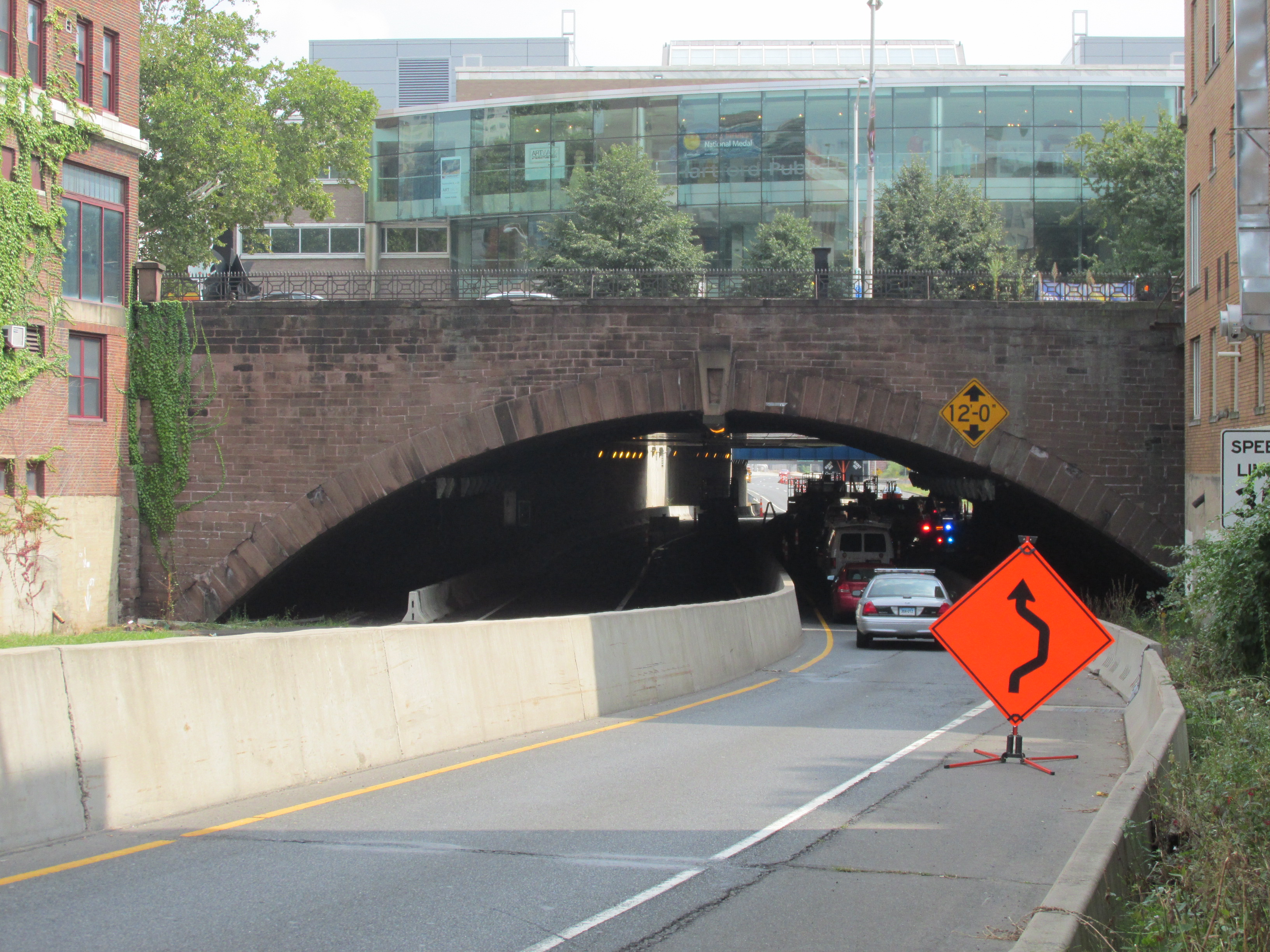

- Location within Connecticut Location within the United States
- Location: Main Street over Whitehead Highway, Hartford, Connecticut
- Coordinates: 41°45′44.1″N 72°40′28.2″W
- Area: less than one acre
- Built: 1833
- MPS: Hartford Downtown MRA
- NRHP reference No.: 85000793
- Added to NRHP: March 28, 1985

The Stone Bridge is a historic bridge in Hartford, Connecticut, carrying Main Street across the Whitehead Highway just South of the City's Downtown. Built in 1833 across the Park River, it was the largest single-span stone bridge in the United States at its completion. It was listed on the National Register of Historic Places in 1985.

== Description and history ==
The Stone Bridge is located just South of Downtown Hartford, serving as the main span carrying Main Street across Whitehead Highway, a limited access connector between Interstate 91 and the capitol district. The highway is built atop a conduit that carries the Park River to the nearby Connecticut River. It now appears as a segmented arch, although it was originally built as a rounded arch over the then-unchanneled river. The bridge has a span of 104 feet (32 m) and has a width of 100 feet (30 m). It is built out of cut brownstone, with stone parapets lining the roadway. The parapets were originally topped by wrought iron railings, one of which was removed when the adjacent Hartford Public Library was built over the highway just east of the bridge.

A bridge has stood at this location since at least the 17th century. Bridges before this one were built of wood. The present bridge was built in 1833 at a cost of $30,000 by Elias Rathbun, a local contractor. The bridge was built at a higher elevation over the river (about 30 feet 9 inches (9.37 m) above the riverbed), necessitating the raising of the grade on the approaches. It became a local landmark, featured in period depictions of the city. In 1955 the river was enclosed and the highway built above it, and in 1955-57 the library was built on the adjacent plaza.

== See also ==
- National Register of Historic Places listings in Hartford, Connecticut
- List of bridges on the National Register of Historic Places in Connecticut
