= Blackledge River Railroad Bridge =

- U.S. National Register of Historic Places
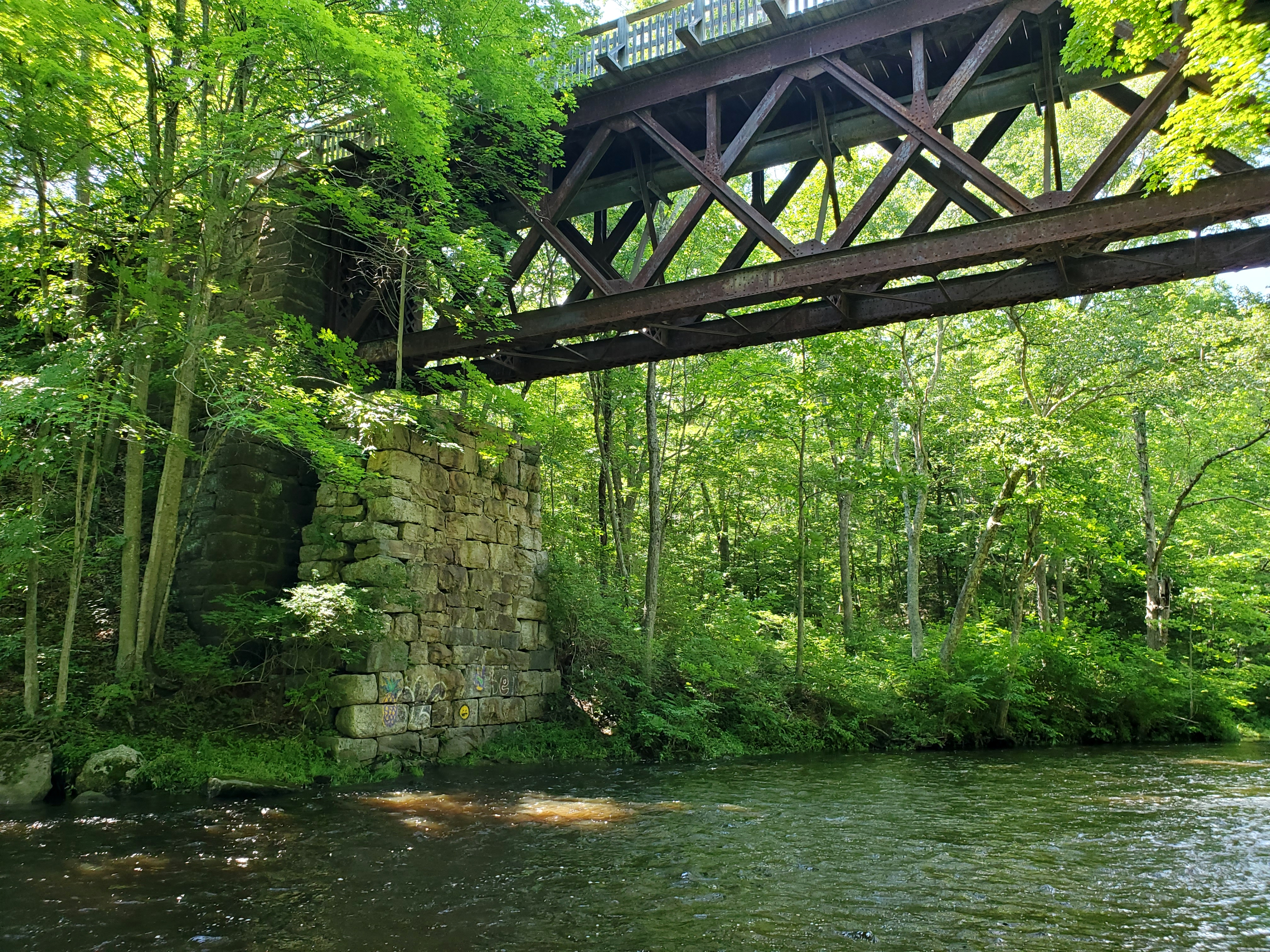
- The Blackledge River Railroad Bridge in June 2021

- Location within Connecticut Location within the United States
- Location: Former Air Line Railroad right-of-way and the Blackledge River, Colchester, Connecticut
- Coordinates: 41°34′55.9″N 72°25′21.1″W
- Area: less than one acre
- Built: c. 1907
- NRHP reference No.: 86002109
- Added to NRHP: July 31, 1986

The Blackledge River Railroad Bridge is a Warren truss bridge that was built on the site of an earlier railroad bridge. The original bridge was completed and opened by August 3, 1877, likely built by the Colchester Railway Company. It was part of the 3.59 miles (5.78 km) of track from Colchester, Connecticut, to Turnerville (now Amston, Connecticut). The line was leased to the Boston and New York Air-Line Railroad, which reported improvement in 1879 and a new 110-foot-long (34 m) iron bridge by 1881. The line was leased to the New York, New Haven and Hartford Railroad in 1882. The New York, New Haven and Hartford Railroad dominated the region and petitioned for changes to the Air Line; the approval came on July 7, 1911.

The historic Blackledge River Railroad Bridge was constructed around 1912 as an improved version of the previous bridge. The new 108-foot-long (33 m) bridge integrated the previous abutments into the design and was elevated a further 5 feet (1.5 m) above the Blackledge River. It was abandoned in the 1960s and sold to the Connecticut Department of Transportation. It was added to the National Register of Historic Places on July 31, 1986. The bridge is now located in Airline State Park. By 2007, a wooden pedestrian bridge was built atop the railroad bridge and crosses over the Blackledge River.

== Previous bridges ==
According to the National Register of Historic Places nomination, the first bridge was constructed in the early 1870s by the Boston and New York Air-Line Railroad. The details on this bridge are largely unknown, but contradictory evidence exists placing the construction of the bridge between 1876 and 1877. According to Marshall, the Air Line Railroad was completed in 1873 and the Colchester branch was completed in 1877.

Organized in 1876, the Colchester line was completed by the Colchester Railway Company. The line operated 3.59 miles of track from Colchester, Connecticut, to Turnerville (now known as Amston, Connecticut) and it opened on August 3, 1877. The line was leased on April 3, 1878, to the Boston & New York Air Line Railroad company for 999 years. In January 1879, the Air Line reported that the Black Ledge bridge had 25,000 yards of earth moved to replace a high piling and 2,500 cubic yards of masonry added in preparation for the installation of a new bridge. In 1881, the Air Line announced the replacement of the Howe truss and the installation of a new 110-foot-long (34 m) iron bridge. On October 1, 1882, the line was leased to the New York, New Haven and Hartford Railroad for 99 years. The Air Line reported to the Railroad Commissioners in 1899 that a bridge over Blackledge River was completed. The New York, New Haven and Hartford dominated the region by 1905, having acquiring over three dozen railroads. In 1907, the company sought to improve and modernize the Air Line. On April 17, 1911, the company petitioned the Railroad Commissioners for alterations and changes. The approval for the changes came on July 7, 1911.

== Second bridge ==
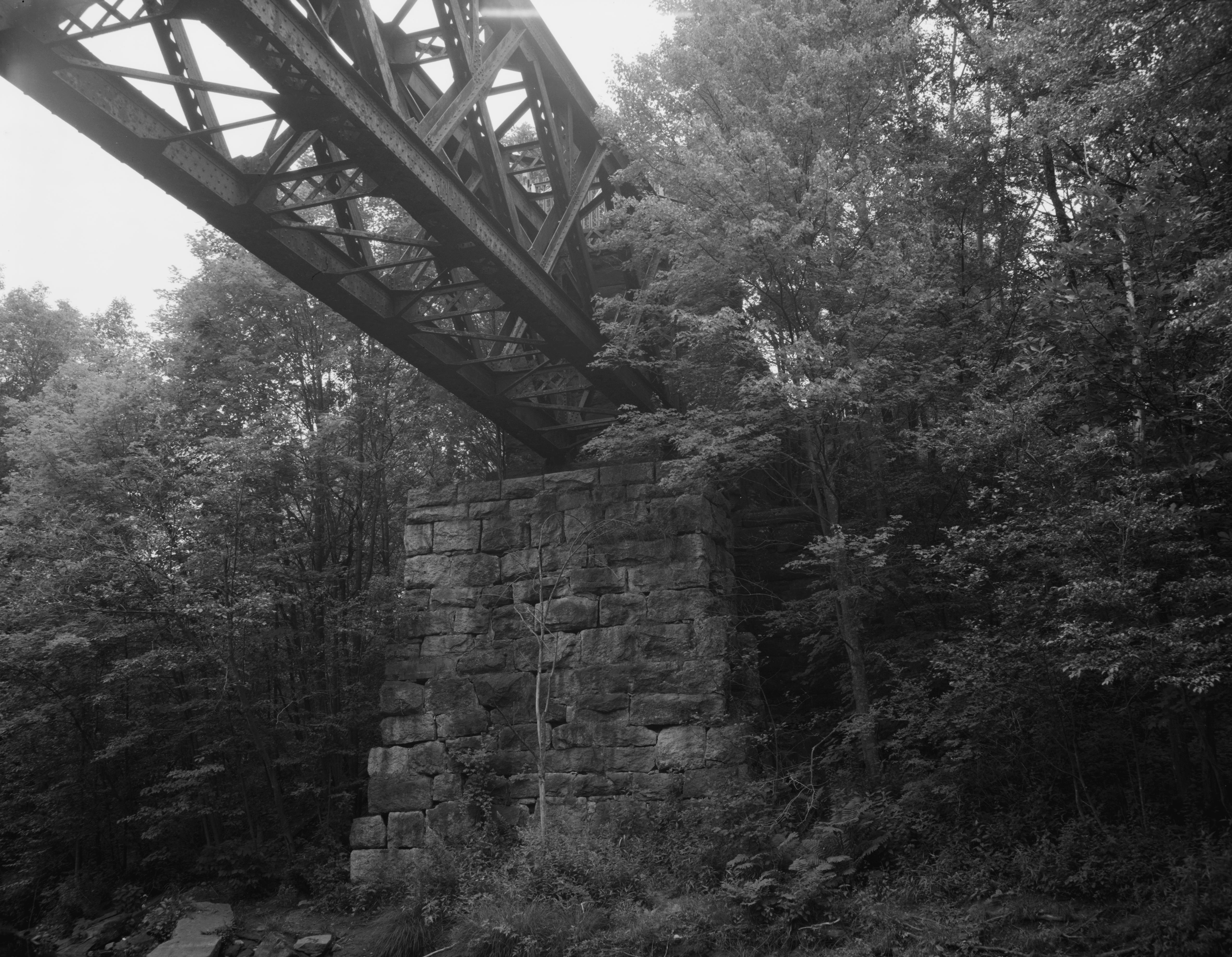
The disused bridge around 1983

The Blackledge River Railroad Bridge was rebuilt to increase the flood clearance and the load-bearing capacity of the bridge, but its abutments were integrated into the new bridge. Completed c. 1912, the replacement Blackledge River Railroad Bridge is a riveted steel, double-intersection Warren deck truss. The original granite stone abutments which supported the previous bridge was reported to be five feet lower, were integrated with the brownstone abutments of the rebuilt bridge. The bottom chord of the span is 32 feet (9.8 m) above the Blackledge River. The truss is 108 feet (33 m) long and about 18 feet (5.5 m) deep. The top and bottom chords are typical box girders with diagonal members and the deck is open. At some point, the bridge was altered with the addition of a sewer pipe.

== Fate ==
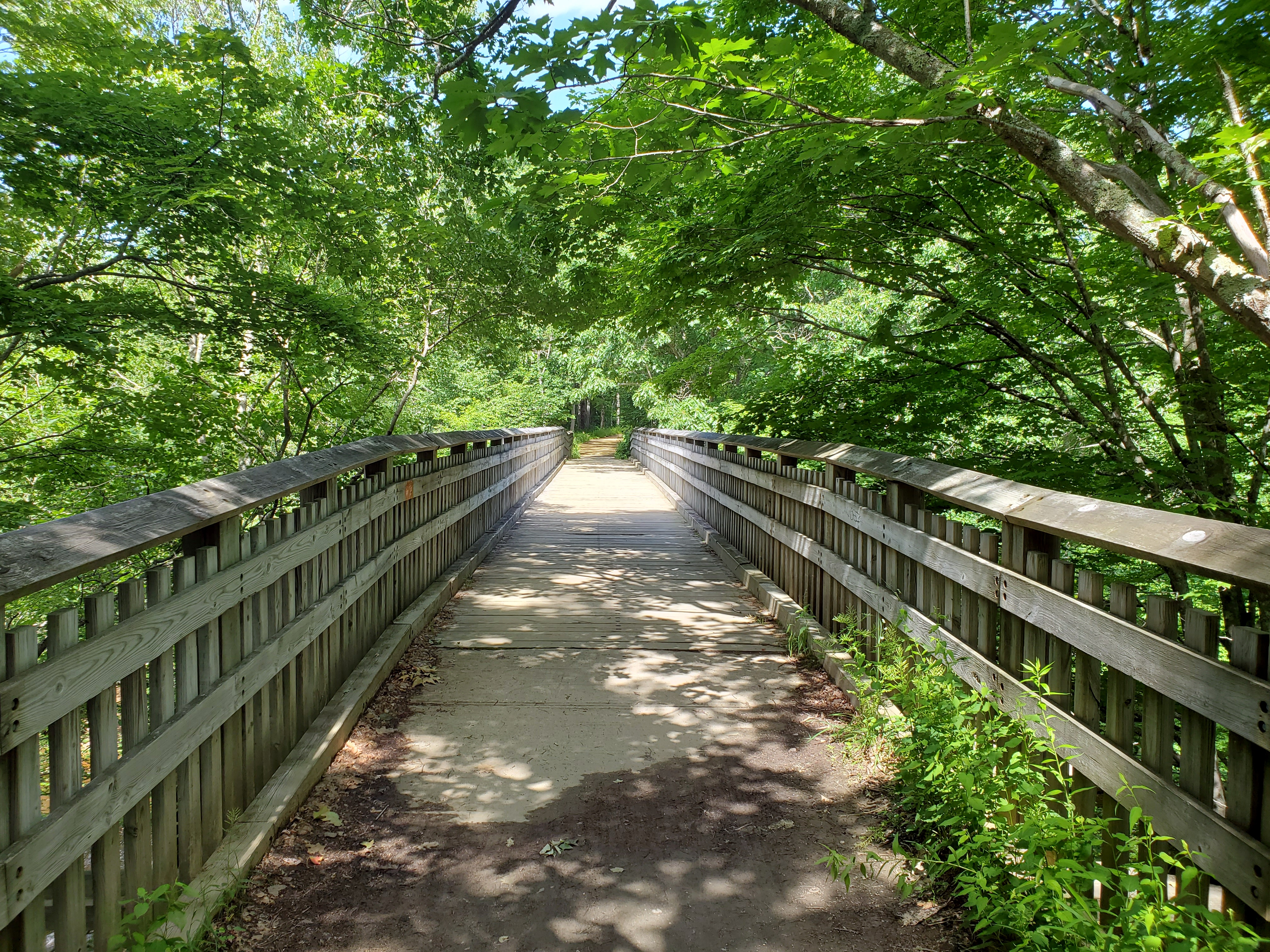
Air Line Trail deck on the bridge

The line continued to serve local passenger and freight trains for decades, but flooding in August 1955 destroyed the critical bridge work in Putnam and lead to its closure in the 1960s. Several years after its abandonment the railroad was sold to Connecticut's Department of Transportation. By 1983, the abandoned railroad bridge had its span sealed off and its tracks lifted. The bridge is in the Salmon River State Forest and is a part of the Air Line State Park Trail. A new wooden bridge allows transportation over the Blackledge River. Constructed prior to 2007, the new wooden bridge decks the railroad bridge. The Connecticut Department of Environmental Protection was assisted by the Coast Guard Academy and the 192nd Engineering Battalion of the Connecticut National Guard.

The National Register of Historic Places nomination lists the Blackledge River Railroad Bridge under both criteria A and C. Criterion A requires the property must make a contribution to the major pattern of American history, and criterion C concerns the distinctive characteristics of the building by its architecture and construction. The basis for its criterion A, is that it was part of a major improvement to the engineering and lines under the operation of the New York, New Haven and Hartford Railroad. The bridge was listed under criterion C as "a representative example of the typical medium-length railroad bridge of the early 20th century." The bridge was added to the National Register of Historic Places on July 31, 1986.

== See also ==
- List of bridges documented by the Historic American Engineering Record in Connecticut
- List of bridges on the National Register of Historic Places in Connecticut
- National Register of Historic Places listings in New London County, Connecticut
