= List of bridges on the National Register of Historic Places in Connecticut =

This is a list of bridges and tunnels on the National Register of Historic Places in the U.S. state of Connecticut.

Name	Image	Built	Listed	Location	County	Type
Arrawanna Bridge	Arrawanna Bridge	1918	2004-09-29	Middletown; 41°33′46″N 72°40′0″W	Middlesex	Open-spandrel concrete arch
Ashland Mill Bridge	Ashland Mill Bridge	1886	1999-04-01, delisted 2016-02-02	Griswold; 41°31′31″N 71°58′28″W	New London	Lenticular pony truss; demolished
Blackledge River Railroad Bridge	Blackledge River Railroad Bridge	ca. 1912	1986-07-31	Colchester; 41°35′2″N 72°25′21″W	New London	Warren truss
Boardman's Bridge	Boardman's Bridge	1888	1976-05-13	New Milford; 41°35′36″N 73°27′2″W	Litchfield	Lenticular truss
Bridge No. 1132	Bridge No. 1132	1934	2004-09-29	Killingworth and Madison; 41°21′33″N 72°43′15″W	Middlesex and New Haven	Open-spandrel concrete arch
Bridge No. 1603	name=Bridge No. 1603	1937	1993-07-29	East Haddam; 41°29′1.5″N 72°20′32.5″W	Middlesex	Stone arch; vernacular, rustic
Bridge No. 1604	name=Bridge No. 1604	1937	1993-07-29	East Haddam; 41°28′38.7″N 72°20′31″W	Middlesex	Stone arch; vernacular, rustic
Bridge No. 1605	name=Bridge No. 1605	1937	1993-07-29	East Haddam; 41°28′32″N 72°20′30.88″W	Middlesex	Stone arch; vernacular, rustic
Bridge No. 1860	Bridge No. 1860	1936	1993-07-29	Montville; 41.48°N 72.0867°W	New London	Stone arch; vernacular, rustic
Bridge No. 2305	Bridge No. 2305	1873	2007-03-09	Salisbury; 41°58′4″N 73°26′22″W	Litchfield	Stone arch
Bridge No. 455	Bridge No. 455	1929	2004-09-29	Suffield; 41°57′30″N 72°37′40″W	Hartford	Open-spandrel concrete arch
Bridge No. 560	Cornwall Bridge	1930	2004-09-29	Cornwall; 41°49′11″N 73°22′25″W	Litchfield	Open spandrel concrete arch
Bulkeley Bridge		1908	1993-12-10	Hartford; 41°46′9″N 72°39′58″W	Hartford	Stone arch
Bull's Bridge	Bull's Bridge	ca. 1870	1972-04-26	Kent; 41°40′32″N 73°30′35″W	Litchfield	Town lattice truss
Butts Bridge	Butts Bridge	1937	2010-5-24	Canterbury; 41°39′05″N 71°58′15″W	Windham	Parker Truss
Comstock's Bridge	Comstock's Bridge	1840, 1868	1976-01-01	East Hampton; 41°33′11″N 72°26′57″W	Middlesex	Howe truss covered bridge
Depot Street Bridge	Depot Street Bridge	1935	2007-03-09	Beacon Falls; 41°26′31″N 73°3′48″W	New Haven	Parker through truss
Drake Hill Road Bridge	Drake Hill Road Bridge	1892	1984-07-19	Simsbury; 41°52′6″N 72°48′1″W	Hartford	Parker truss
Farmington River Railroad Bridge	Farmington River Railroad Bridge	1867	1972-08-25	Windsor; 41°51′28″N 72°38′30″W	Hartford	Stone arch
Glen Falls Bridge	Glen Falls Bridge	1886	1999-04-01	Plainfield; 41°43′1″N 71°51′43″W	Windham	Lenticular through Truss
Hamburg Bridge Historic District	name=Hamburg Bridge	1936	1983-03-10	Lyme; 41.394476°N 72.350676°W	New London	Concrete arch; Queen Anne
Housatonic River Railroad Bridge	Housatonic River Railroad Bridge	1904	1987-06-12	Milford-Stratford; 41°12′19″N 73°6′37″W	Fairfield	Scherzer Rolling Lift Bascule
Lover's Leap Bridge	Lover's Leap Lenticular Bridge	1895	1976-05-13	New Milford; 41°32′39″N 73°24′26″W	Litchfield	Lenticular
Lyman Viaduct	Lyman Viaduct	1873	1986-08-21	Colchester; 41°33′53″N 72°26′46″W	New London	Buried wrought iron railroad trestle
Main Street Bridge	Main Street Bridge, Stamford, Connecticut	1888	1987-05-21	Stamford; 41°3′14″N 73°32′44″W	Fairfield	Lenticular pony truss; closed to vehicular traffic
Melrose Road Bridge	Melrose Road Bridge	1888	1999-08-05	East Windsor; 41°56′18″N 72°32′51″W	Hartford	Lenticular pony truss
Merritt Parkway Bridges	James Farm Road Bridge	1930s	1991	Greenwich, Stamford, New Canaan, Norwalk, Westport, Fairfield, Trumbull, Stratford	Fairfield County	Sixty-six beam and arched structures of various 1930s styles, including Art Deco, Art Moderne and Neoclassicism.
Mianus River Railroad Bridge	Mianus River Railroad Bridge	1904	1987-06-12	Greenwich; 41°1′51″N 73°35′41″W	Fairfield	Deck Girder, Bascule
Mill Brook Bridge	name=Mill Brook Bridge	ca. 1790s	1997-01-02	Lisbon; 41°33′30″N 72°2′25″W	New London	Masonry arch; partially collapsed
Minortown Road Bridge		1890	2001-08-17	Woodbury; 41°34′36″N 73°10′34″W	Litchfield	Lenticular pony truss
Mystic Bridge Historic District		1922	1979-08-31	Mystic; 41.354710°N 71.968759°W	New London	Strauss Heel Trunnion Bascule
Norwalk River Railroad Bridge		1896	1987-06-12	South Norwalk; 41°6′2″N 73°24′57″W	Fairfield	Rim Bearing, Swing
Packerville Bridge	Packerville Bridge	1886	1992-11-27	Plainfield; 41°40′1″N 71°56′56″W	Windham	Masonry arch
Pequabuck Bridge	Pequabuck Bridge	1832, 1833	1984-07-19	Farmington; 41°42′59″N 72°50′25″W	Hartford	Stone arch
Pequonnock River Railroad Bridge	Pequonnock River Railroad Bridge	1902	1987-06-12	Bridgeport; 41°10′59″N 73°11′11″W	Fairfield	Through Girder Bascule
Perry Avenue Bridge	Perry Avenue Bridge	1899	2006-10-25	Norwalk; 41°9′4″N 73°26′45″W	Fairfield	Single-span arch-deck
Pine Creek Park Bridge	name=Pine Creek Park Bridge	1872, 1890, 1979	1992-04-08	Fairfield; 41°7′31″N 73°15′48″W	Fairfield	Pratt pony truss
Rapallo Viaduct	Rapallo Viaduct	1873	1986-08-21	East Hampton; 41°34′19″N 72°28′19″W	Middlesex	Filled-over wrought iron railroad viaduct
Red Bridge	Red Bridge	1891	1993-12-10	Meriden; 41°31′20″N 72°50′20″W	New Haven	Lenticular truss
Reynolds Bridge	Reynolds Bridge	1928	2004-09-29	Thomaston; 41°39′11″N 73°4′39″W	Litchfield	Open-spandrel concrete arch
River Road Stone Arch Railroad Bridge	River Road Stone RR Bridge	1887	1986-08-21	Colchester; 41°34′49″N 72°25′32″W	New London	Stone arch
Riverside Avenue Bridge		1871	1977-08-29	Greenwich; 41°1′54″N 73°35′18″W	Fairfield	Pratt truss
Saugatuck River Bridge	Saugatuck River Bridge	1884	1987-02-12	Westport; 41°7′22″N 73°22′10″W	Fairfield	Pin-connected swing bridge
Saugatuck River Railroad Bridge	Saugatuck River Railroad Bridge	1905	1987-06-12	Westport; 41°7′10″N 73°22′8″W	Fairfield	Deck Girder, Bascule
Sheffield Street Bridge	Sheffield Street Bridge	1884	2001-04-12	Waterbury; 41°35′50″N 73°2′52″W	New Haven	Lenticular pony truss
Skilton Road Bridge		ca. 1865	1991-12-10	Watertown; 41°37′45″N 73°9′33″W	Litchfield	Masonry-arch
Starr Mill Road Bridge		1927	1993-12-10	Middletown; 41°32′56″N 72°40′38″W	Middlesex	Warren through truss
Stone Bridge		1833	1985-03-28	Hartford; 41°45′44″N 72°40′36″W	Hartford	Stone arch
Town Bridge	Town Bridge	1895	1999-08-05	Canton; 41°49′28″N 72°55′43″W	Hartford	Parker through truss
Turn-of-River Bridge	Turn-of-River Bridge	1892, 1893	1987-07-31	Stamford; 41°6′54″N 73°32′42″W	Fairfield	Lenticular pony truss; foot traffic only
Washington Avenue Bridge	Washington Avenue Bridge	1881	2001-04-12	Waterbury; 41°32′38″N 73°2′18″W	New Haven	Lenticular pony truss
Washington Bridge	Washington Bridge	1921	2004-09-29	Milford & Stratford; 41°12′1″N 73°6′39″W	Fairfield & New Haven	Open-spandrel concrete arch bascule bridge
West Cornwall Covered Bridge		1864	1975-12-30	West Cornwall; 41°52′18″N 73°21′52″W	Litchfield	Town lattice truss
Willimantic Footbridge	name=Willimantic Footbridge	1906	1979-04-19	Willimantic; 41°42′36″N 72°12′53″W	Windham	Steel truss footbridge
