= Mill Brook Bridge =

- U.S. National Register of Historic Places
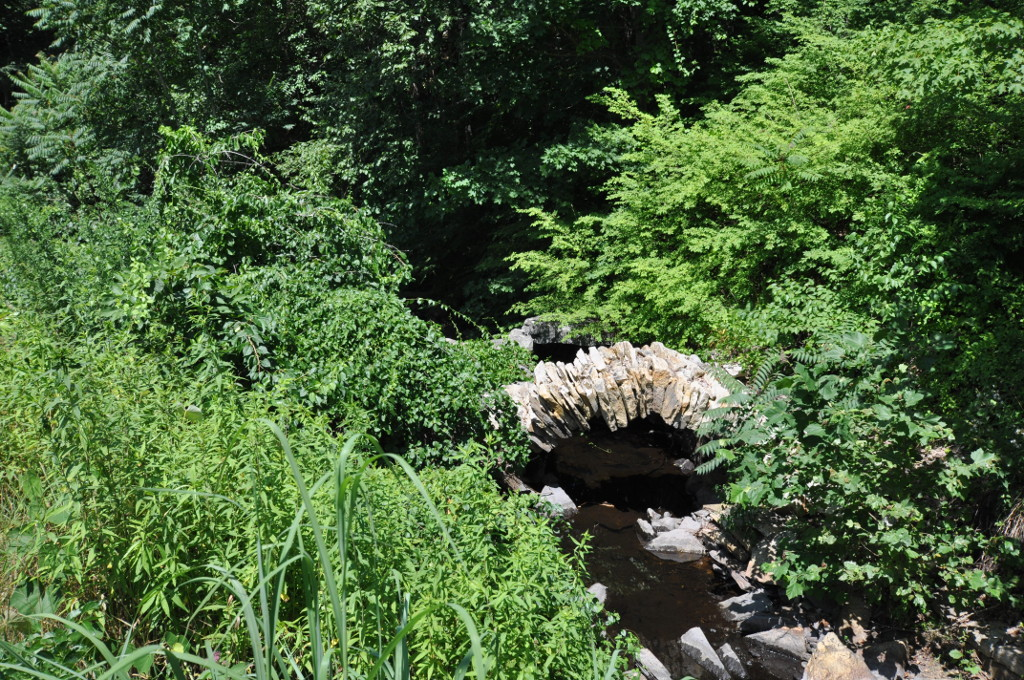
- Bridge remnant, 2016

- Location within Connecticut Location within the United States
- Location: Blissville Road, Junction of Mill Brook, Lisbon, Connecticut
- Coordinates: 41°33′30″N 72°02′25″W
- Area: less than one acre
- Architectural style: masonry arch
- NRHP reference No.: 96001498
- Added to NRHP: January 2, 1997

The Mill Brook Bridge is a historic stone arch bridge, located just North of Lower Blissville Road in Lisbon, Connecticut. With a plausibly estimated construction date of the 1790s, it is probably the oldest surviving stone arch bridge in the state. It was listed on the National Register of Historic Places in 1997. Since then, it has deteriorated and is partially collapsed.

== Description and history ==
The Mill Brook Bridge is located several hundred yards East of the Shetucket River, on the North Side of Lower Blissville Road just west of its Junction with Icehouse and Blissville Roads. It is a single-span masonry arch, with a span of about 10 feet (3.0 m) across Mill Brook, which the roadway crosses on a modern steel girder bridge. The arch is built out of roughly hewn rubble stone, and was originally laid dry (without any mortar. It would have been topped by layers of soil, with a roadbed above. The arch originally had a width of about 18 feet (5.5 m). The bridge's top layers have been eroded away, and part of the arch has collapsed.

The bridge was originally located where Lower Blissville Road now runs; it was relocated to its present position in 1915, when a modern bridge was built on the site. The road has been a historically important route, opened by 1717, as a route connecting Norwich and Plainfield. By the late 18th century, the route had been designated as a post route, resulting in an increase in stagecoach traffic. In 1790, the town of Lisbon made a number of improvements to the route, documented in 1792 to include a "stone causeway" on Bundy Hill, the slope to the west. The bridge's dry laid and rough cut construction is consistent with bridge building of the period, where later bridge construction tended to use mortar and more formally dressed stone.

== See also ==
- National Register of Historic Places listings in New London County, Connecticut
- List of bridges on the National Register of Historic Places in Connecticut
