= Bridge No. 2305 =

- Bridge #2305
- U.S. National Register of Historic Places
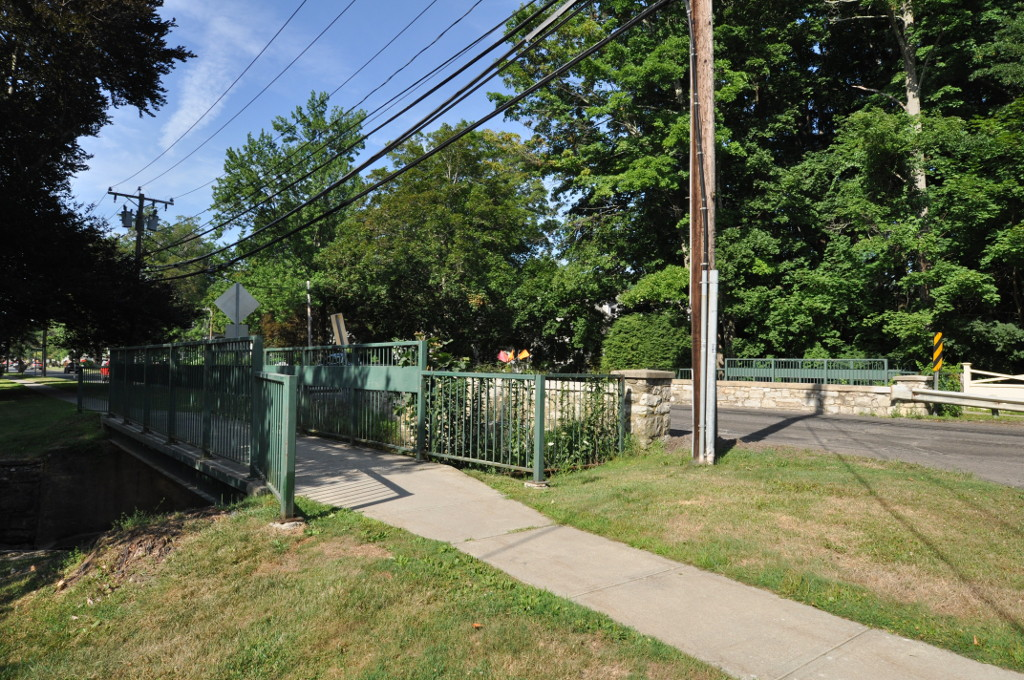
- View of bridge top

- Location within Connecticut Location within the United States
- Location: US 44 (Main Street) over Burton Brook, Salisbury, Connecticut
- Coordinates: 41°58′4″N 73°26′22″W
- Area: less than one acre
- Built: 1873
- Built by: Col. Lorenzo Tupper
- NRHP reference No.: 07000109
- Added to NRHP: March 9, 2007

Bridge No. 2305, also known locally as the Burton Brook Bridge, is a historic bridge carrying U.S. Route 44 (US 44; Main Street) over Burton Brook in the Lakeville village of Salisbury, Connecticut. Built in 1873, this masonry arch bridge is a rare surviving example in the state of a typical late-19th century road bridge. It was listed on the National Register of Historic Places in 2007.

== Description and history ==
The Burton Brook Bridge is located in a residential area to the north of Lakeville's village center, carrying Main Street, a major east-west route, across Burton Brook between Bostwick and Walton Streets. Burton Brook flows roughly east, and the bridge is thus oriented roughly north-south. It is a single-span masonry structure, with an arch 20 feet (6.1 m) long and 29 feet (8.8 m) wide. It is fashioned out of locally quarried marble, with its exterior finished in roughly dressed mortared square blocks. Parapets about 2 feet 6 inches (0.76 m) in height flank the roadway, which carries two lanes of traffic. The bridge is flanked on either side by iron-railed pedestrian bridges.

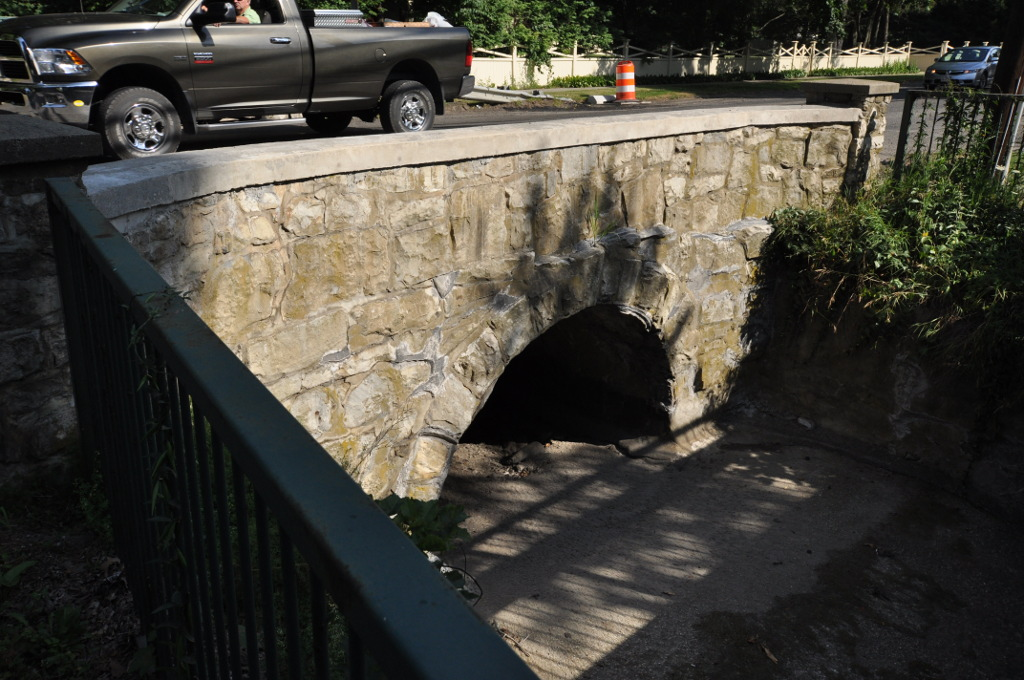
Profile view of the bridge, as seen from the eastern pedestrian bridge

According to historic maps of the village, a bridge has stood at or near this site since at least 1811. The bridge was built in 1873-74 for the town by Lorenzo Tupper, a local stonemason. Tupper was also a prominent local businessman who served in a variety of town offices, including on its road commission. The bridge was taken over by the state when the route of US 44 was designated in 1935 by the state. The bridge has survived use on a major roadway in part because it was engineered to withstand heavy loads of iron ore that were transported through the area in the late 19th century.

== See also ==
- National Register of Historic Places listings in Litchfield County, Connecticut
- List of bridges on the National Register of Historic Places in Connecticut
