= Jeremy River =

River in Connecticut, United States

Coordinates: 41°35′18″N 72°23′05″W

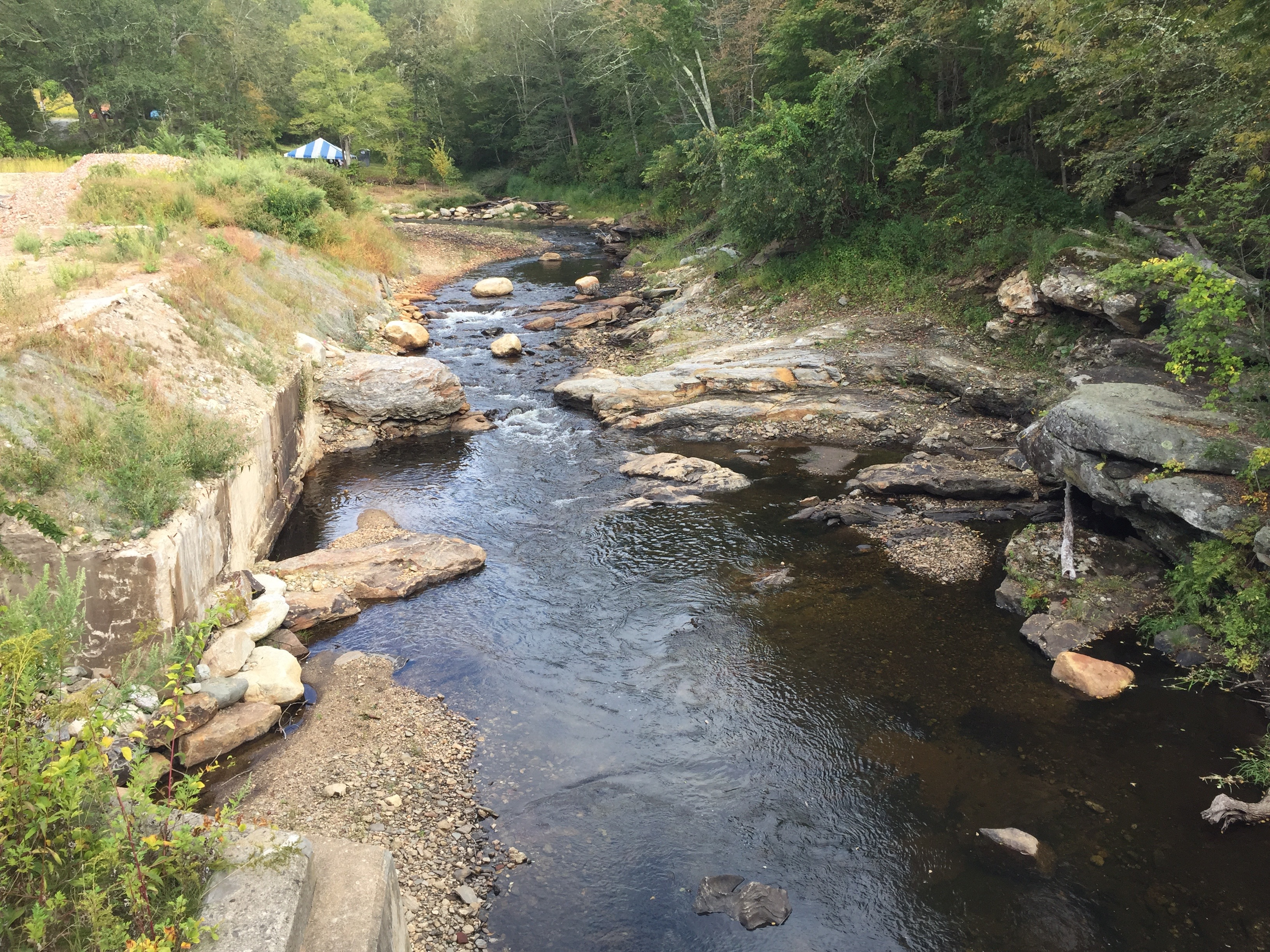
The Jeremey River in Colchester following the removal of Norton Mill Dam

The Jeremy River, named after Jeremy Adams, begins at a drainage just north of Holbrook Pond about 1.5 miles (2.4 km) east of Gilead, Connecticut, and runs for 10.7 miles (17.2 km) to the Salmon River in Colchester, Connecticut. There are many swamps and marshes along the banks of its northern end, the largest of which is 1.5 miles (2.4 km) long.

There is a popular paddling route along the Jeremy River that begins at Old Hartford Road just north of Connecticut Route 2 about 3 miles (5 km) west-northwest of Colchester. The 2.5-mile (4.0 km) route has solid Class II whitewater throughout the run and ends at the Salmon River; however, many paddlers continue along the Salmon River paddling route.

The Norton Paper Mill is located on Jeremy River (in Colchester, Connecticut). It operated from 1895 until the early 1960s, before becoming abandoned by the early 1980s, and falling into disrepair. A fire engulfed the building on July 8, 2012, consuming most of the remaining combustibles (the largely-intact walls being made of brick). The property was purchased by the Town of Colchester in 2015 (for $1), with plans to remove the building and redevelop the site as a public park. The Nature Conservancy in Connecticut removed the adjacent dam in 2016.

== Crossings ==
County	Town	Carrying
Tolland	Hebron	Route 85
Tolland	Hebron	Marjorie Circle
Tolland	Hebron	Route 66
Tolland	Hebron	Chestnut Hill Road
Tolland	Hebron	Hope Valley Road
Tolland	Hebron	Reidy Hill Road
Tolland	Hebron	Grayville Road
Tolland	Hebron	Air Line State Park Trail South
New London	Colchester	Old Hartford Road
New London	Colchester	Route 2
New London	Colchester	Private Drive
New London	Colchester	Route 149
New London	Colchester	Salmon River

== See also ==
- List of rivers of Connecticut
