= Warranocke =

Indigenous people of New England

The Warranocke were an Indigenous people of the Northeastern Woodlands who lived in New England.

They are presumed to be one of the first tribes to trade with the early Puritan settlers of Colonial New England. The first entry in the Colonial Records of Connecticut, April 6, 1636, referenced a trade with the Indians where the tribe received a gun in exchange for corn.
