= Salmon River (Connecticut) =

River in Connecticut, US

Coordinates: 41°29′58″N 72°29′17″W

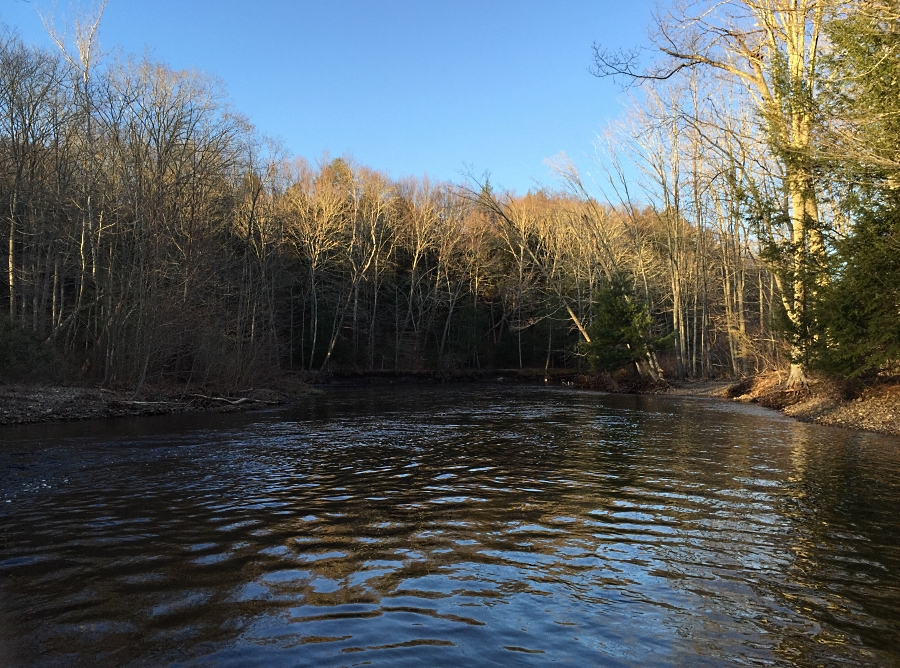
- Looking downstream on the Salmon River immediately after the confluence of the Jeremy and Blackledge Rivers.

Location
- Country: United States
- State: Connecticut
- Cities: Colchester, East Hampton, East Haddam, Haddam

Physical characteristics
- Source confluence: confluence of Blackledge River and Jeremy River
  - location: Colchester, New London County, Connecticut
- Mouth: confluence with Connecticut River
  - location: East Haddam & Haddam, Middlesex County
- Length: 10.4 mi (16.7 km)
- Basin size: 150 mi^{2} (390 km^{2})

Basin features
- Tributaries
  - left: Day Pond Brook, Moodus River
  - right: Dickinson Creek, Flat Brook, Safstrom Brook, Elbow Brook, Pine Brook

The Salmon River is formed at the confluence of the Blackledge and Jeremy rivers about one mile west of North Westchester, Connecticut. It drains 96,000 acres and courses for 10.4 miles (16.7 km) to Salmon Cove near Moodus where it flows into the Connecticut River. The Salmon River is probably the largest stream and watershed whose sources and mouth are entirely within the limits of Connecticut.

There is a popular paddling route along the Salmon River varying in difficulty from quickwater to Class II whitewater. It begins along River Road about 1/10 of a mile south of the river's formation and continues for about 7 miles to the flatwater of Salmon Cove.

The Salmon River's substantial drop in elevation over its course provided considerable water power to the textile mills in Moodus during the 19th and early 20th centuries.

== Conservation ==
Beginning in the early 20th century, significant efforts have been invested on the federal, state and local levels towards conserving both the Salmon River corridor itself and the broader territory encompassed by its watershed.

The Salmon River Division of the Silvio O. Conte National Wildlife Refuge encompasses 425 acres of freshwater tidal marshes, riparian meadows, cold-water tributary streams, floodplain forests, mixed hardwood forest, hemlock stands and vernal pools along the lower stretches of the river near its confluence with the Connecticut.

Connecticut's State Board of Fisheries and Game established the Salmon River State Forest in 1934. Subsequent acquisitions by the state have enlarged the forest to its present size of roughly 6,000 acres throughout Hebron, Marlborough, Colchester, East Haddam and East Hampton. The 300-acre Machimoodus State Park in East Haddam, 180-acre Day Pond State Park in Colchester and the 465-acre Wopowaug Wildlife Management Area in East Hampton and Haddam further contribute to the state's role in conserving the natural habitats and rural character of the Salmon River watershed.

Land trusts hold numerous, smaller nature preserves and conservation easements throughout the Salmon River basin such as Pine Brook Preserve in Haddam, Keech Preserve and Salmon Cove Preserve in East Haddam and the Gateway Property and Palakewitz Easement in Colchester.

== See also ==
- Comstock's Bridge
- List of rivers of Connecticut
- Salmon River State Forest
