= Blackledge River =

River in Middlesex and Tolland County, Connecticut, US

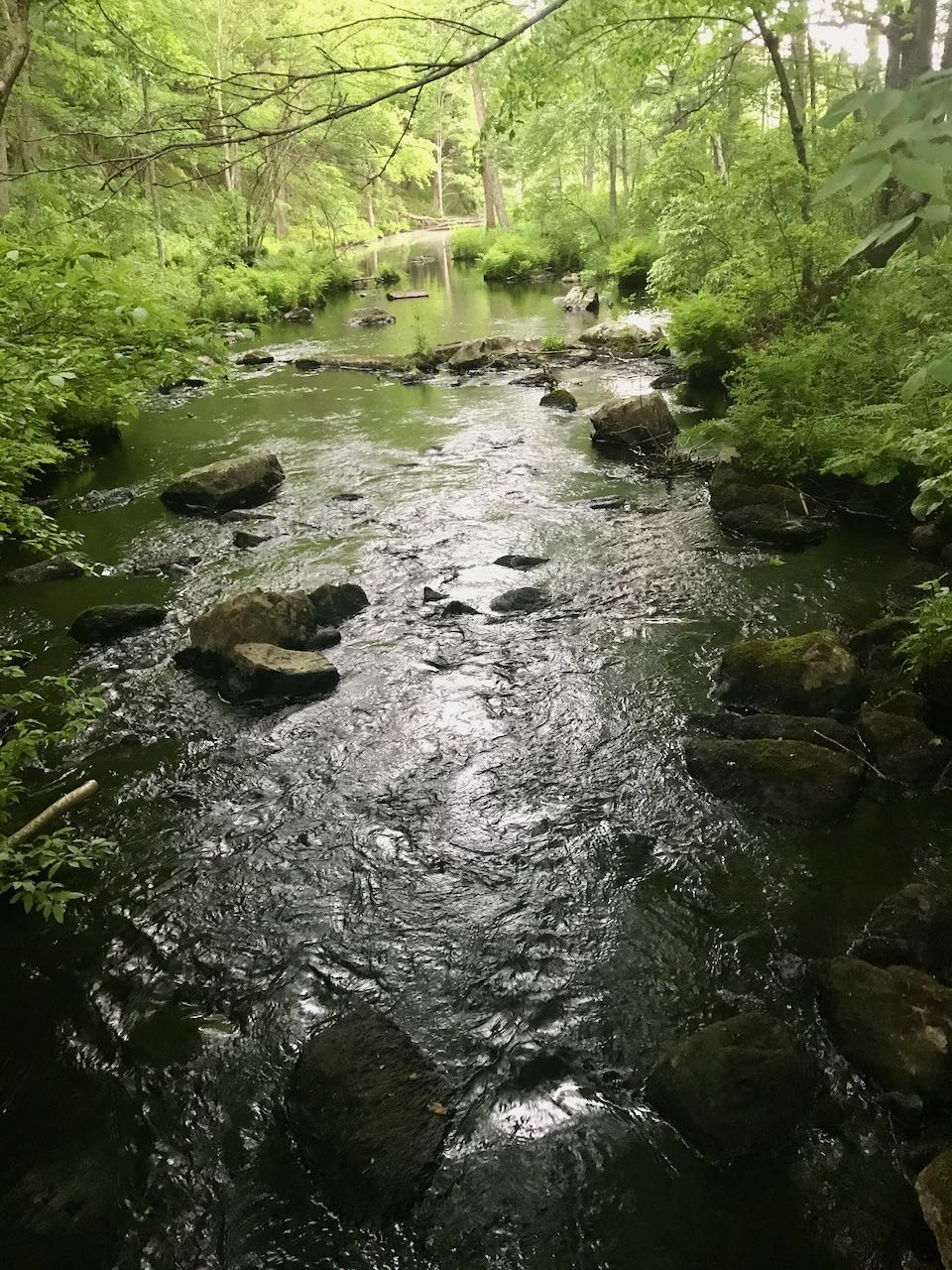
- Looking southward at the Blackledge River from a foot bridge at the southernmost point on the border between Connecticut's Gay City State Park and Meshomasic State Forest. Beginning and end of Blackledge River in Connecticut

Location
- Country: United States
- State: Connecticut
- County: Tolland, Middlesex
- Towns: Bolton, Hebron, Colchester

Physical characteristics
- Source: Sperry Pond at CT-534 (Camp Meeting Road) and French Road, Bolton, CT
  - location: Bolton
  - coordinates: (41°45′37″N 72°26′58″W)
- Mouth: Salmon River
  - location: Confluence of Blackledge and Jeremy Rivers, start of Salmon River Colchester
  - coordinates: (41°34′43″N 72°25′28″W)
- Length: 16.4 mi (26.4 km)
- Basin size: 17,341.03 acres (7,017.67 ha)

Basin features
- River system: Salmon
- Tributaries
  - left: French Brook, Flat Brook
  - right: Foot Sawmill Brook, Fawn Brook, Jeremy River

The Blackledge River is a tributary of the Salmon River which courses 16.4 miles (26.4 km) through eastern Connecticut in the United States.

Rising from Sperry Pond in Bolton, the Blackledge amasses waters from feeder creeks along its course before joining the Jeremy River in Colchester, Connecticut. Salmon River, considered a major tributary of the Connecticut River, begins at the confluence of the Blackledge and Jeremy.

A popular whitewater paddling route begins at West Road about 4 miles (6 km) south of Gay City State Park. There are frequent Class I-II whitewater rapids throughout the route to the Salmon River.

== Bridges ==
- Blackledge River Railroad Bridge
- Foot Bridge on Gay City State Park Red Trail (at southern border with Meshomasic State Forest)

== See also ==
- List of rivers of Connecticut
- Gay City State Park
