= Salmon River State Forest =

Connecticut State Forest

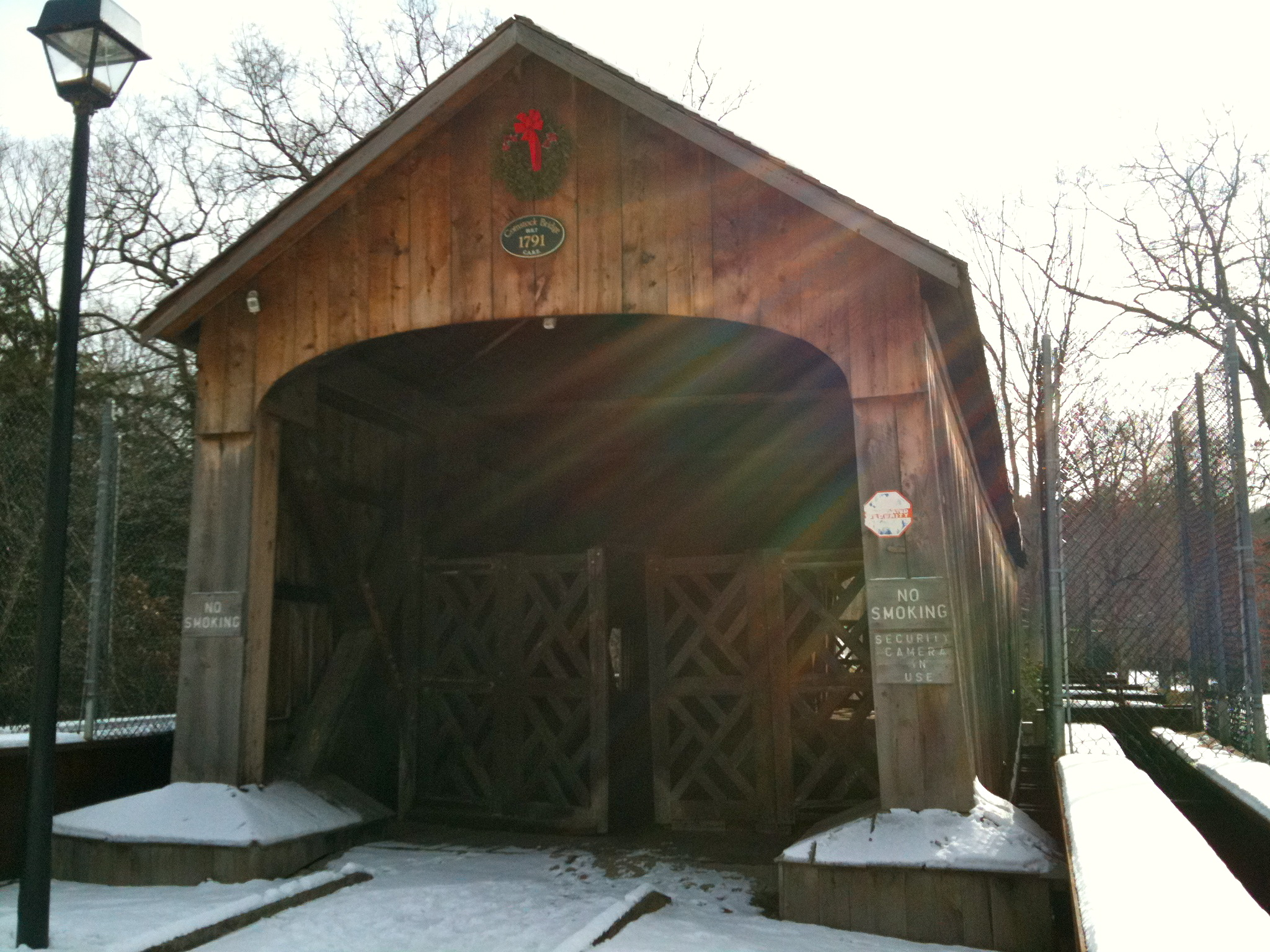

- Location within Connecticut Location within the United States
- Location: Connecticut, United States
- Coordinates: 41°39′11″N 72°26′06″W
- Area: 6,905 acres (2,794 ha)
- Elevation: 430 ft (130 m)
- Established: 1934
- Administrator: Connecticut Department of Energy and Environmental Protection
- Website: Official website

Salmon River State Forest is a Connecticut state forest located in the towns of Hebron, Marlborough, Colchester, East Haddam, and East Hampton. It includes 1,300 acres (530 ha) leased from the United States government. The forest features Comstock's Bridge, the only remaining covered bridge in eastern Connecticut, which spans the Salmon River near Route 16 in East Hampton.

== Recreation opportunities ==
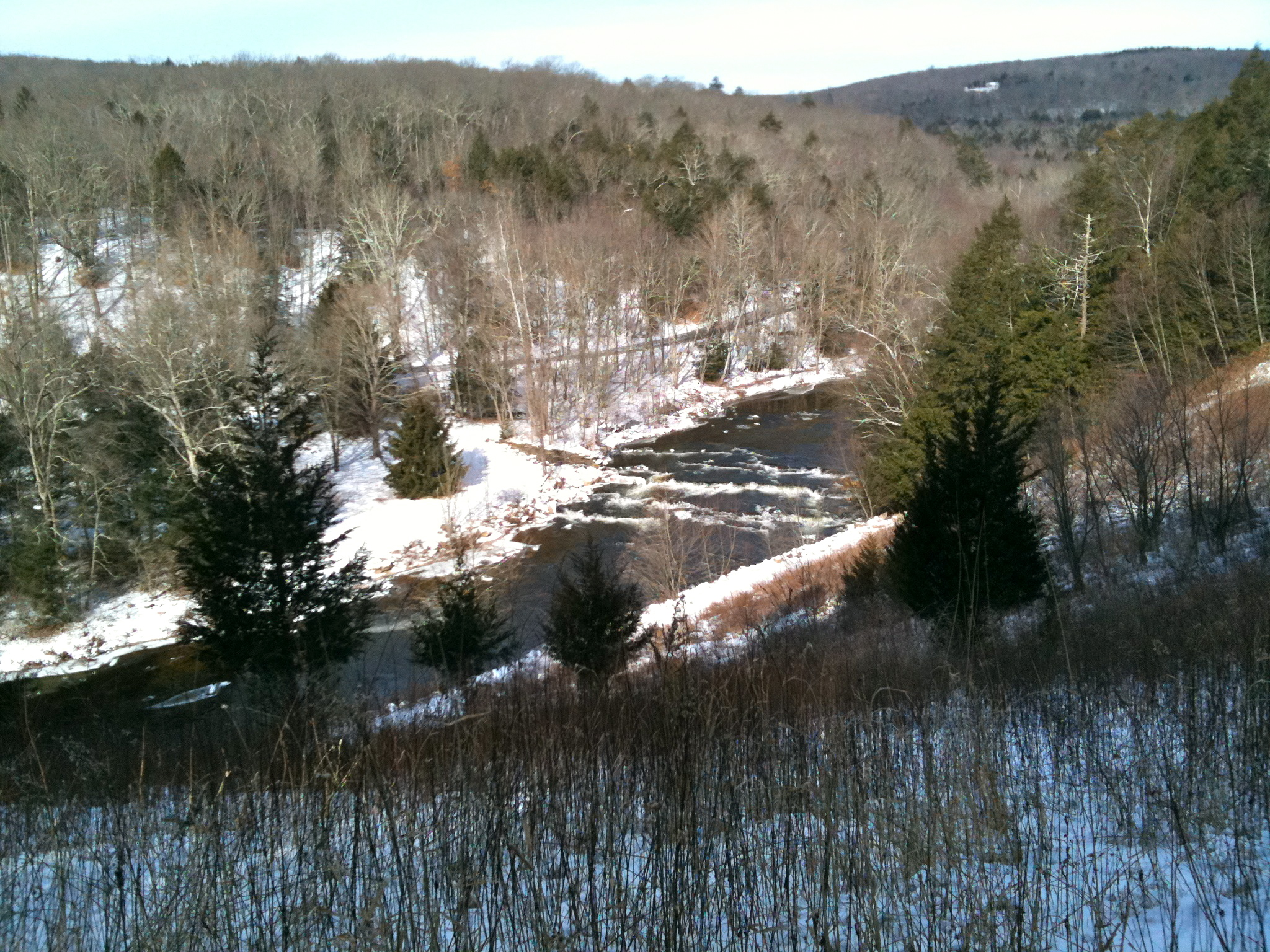
Salmon River upriver from the Comstock Bridge viewed from the Salmon River Trail

The forest's hiking trails include the 6.7-mile (10.8 km) blue-blazed Salmon River Trail and a portion of the Airline State Park, a rail trail that features the 137-foot (42 m)-high Lyman Viaduct. Fishing opportunities include a handicap accessible fly fishing area and a disabled veterans fishing area. The forest also offers facilities for field sports, hunting, mountain biking, and picnicking.
