= Lover's Leap (disambiguation) =

A Lover's Leap, or (in plural) Lovers' Leap, is a toponym given to a number of locations of great height.

Lover's Leap or Lovers' Leap may also refer to:

== Places ==
- Lover's Leap (Tahoe, California), U.S., a granite cliff
- Lovers Leap State Park, an area on the Housatonic River in Millford, Connecticut, U.S.
  - Lover's Leap Bridge, in the state park
- Lover's Leap Lighthouse, Jamaica

See the main article for a list of other places so named.

== Games ==
- Lover's leap (backgammon)

== Music ==
- "Lover's Leap" by Les Brown composed by Bob Higgins
- "Lover's Leap" ("Supper's Ready"), the first part of the song "Supper's Ready" by Genesis
- "Lovers' Leap", a 2024 song by Elbow from their album Audio Vertigo
