= Old Boardman Bridge =

- U.S. National Register of Historic Places
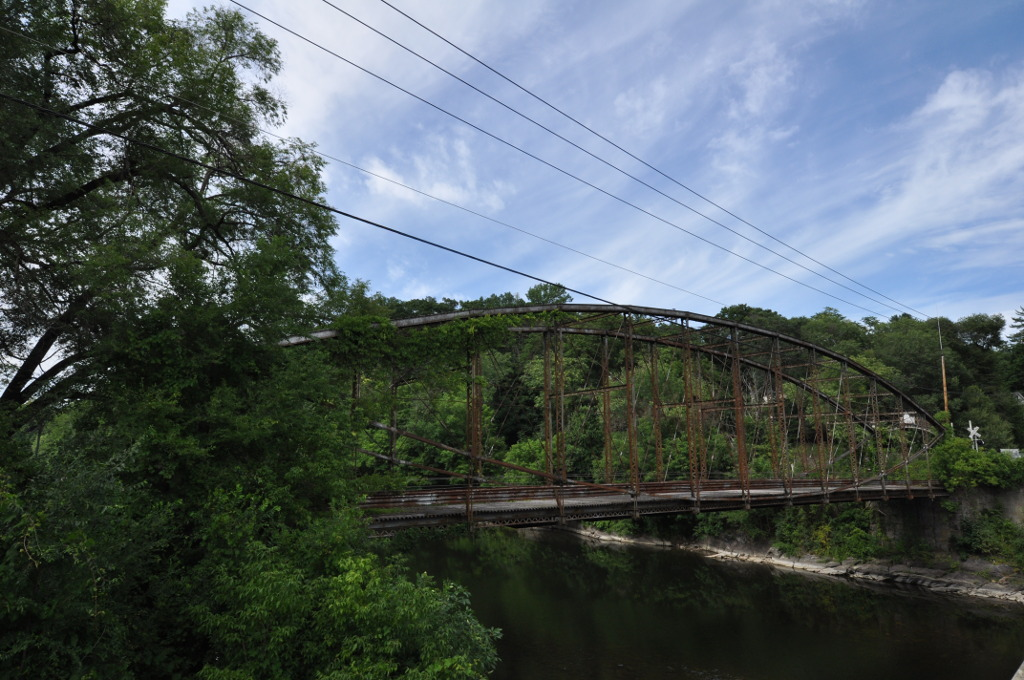

- Location within Connecticut Location within the United States
- Location: Across the Housatonic River near Boardman Road, New Milford, Connecticut
- Coordinates: 41°35′36″N 73°27′2″W
- Area: 1 acre (0.40 ha)
- Built: 1888
- Built by: Berlin Iron Bridge Co.; Douglas & Jarvis
- Architectural style: Lenticular truss
- NRHP reference No.: 76001983
- Added to NRHP: May 13, 1976

The Old Boardman Bridge, formerly Boardman Bridge, is a historic lenticular truss bridge, which used to carry Boardman Road across the Housatonic River in New Milford, Connecticut. Built from 1887 to 1888 out of wrought iron, it is one of the state's three surviving examples of this bridge type, and along with Lover's Leap Bridge, one of two in New Milford. It was listed on the National Register of Historic Places in 1976. The bridge was closed to vehicles in 1984 and to pedestrians in 1985; however, the Town of New Milford is seeking to restore it and reopen it to pedestrian traffic.

== Description ==
Old Boardman Bridge is located in North Central Western New Milford, Northeast of the Junction of U.S. Route 7 and Boardman Road. It spans the Housatonic River a few feet north (upriver) of the current Boardman Bridge that carries Boardman Road over the water. There are small public parks at each end of the bridge, which is closed to all access. It is a lenticular truss structure built out of wrought iron, and is 188 feet (57 m) long, with a roadway width of 15 feet 6 inches (4.72 m). It passes about 20 feet (6.1 m) over the typical water level of the river. The trusses are set on abutments of rough-cut stone, with box girder columns supporting the ends of the trusses. Truss joints are pinned together. and there are numerous diagonal and cross-bracing elements of narrower gauge than the main chords. The deck is supported by I-bars descending from the trusses at 12 points, originally consisting of corrugated metal sheets laid on I-beams.

== History ==
A wooden toll bridge, built in 1840, had been swept away in the flood of 1854. The iron bridge was rebuilt in 1887-1888 by the Berlin Iron Bridge Company, during a period when iron was supplanting wood as a preferred bridge-building material, but had not yet itself been replaced by steel.

It carried pedestrians, horses and buggies, and vehicles over the Housatonic River for almost a century before a new two-lane steel bridge, also called Boardman Bridge, replaced it in 1984. The Old Boardman Bridge was closed to vehicles, but was still open to foot traffic for another year before the deck was deemed to be unsafe, and the bridge was permanently closed with a chain-link fence.

Efforts were made to restore the bridge in the early 2000s; however, the funds went to restoring Lover's Leap Bridge, the other lenticular truss bridge in town at Lovers Leap State Park.

== Future and Possible Restoration ==
On July 26, 2017, with the suggestion of Mayor David R. Gronbach, the New Milford Town Council voted to establish the Old Boardman Bridge Committee to determine how to best rehabilitate and reopen the bridge to foot and bicycle traffic. As the current Boardman Bridge does not have sidewalks or shoulders, this would allow for safe pedestrian crossing between Route 7 and the Sega Meadows Trail and future New Milford River Trail.

Plans for reopening the bridge will include removing the vegetation that is growing on and around it, masonry repair of the abutments and wing walls, replacing the unsafe deck with a timber decking, repairing and replacing the structural components, and repainting it.

== See also ==
- National Register of Historic Places listings in Litchfield County, Connecticut
- List of bridges on the National Register of Historic Places in Connecticut
