= Joseph Ouellette =

Joseph Ouellette may refer to:

- Joseph R. Ouellette, United States Army soldier and Medal of Honor recipient
- Joseph E. M. Ouellette, member of the Legislative Assembly of New Brunswick
