= Pineground Bridge =

- U.S. National Register of Historic Places
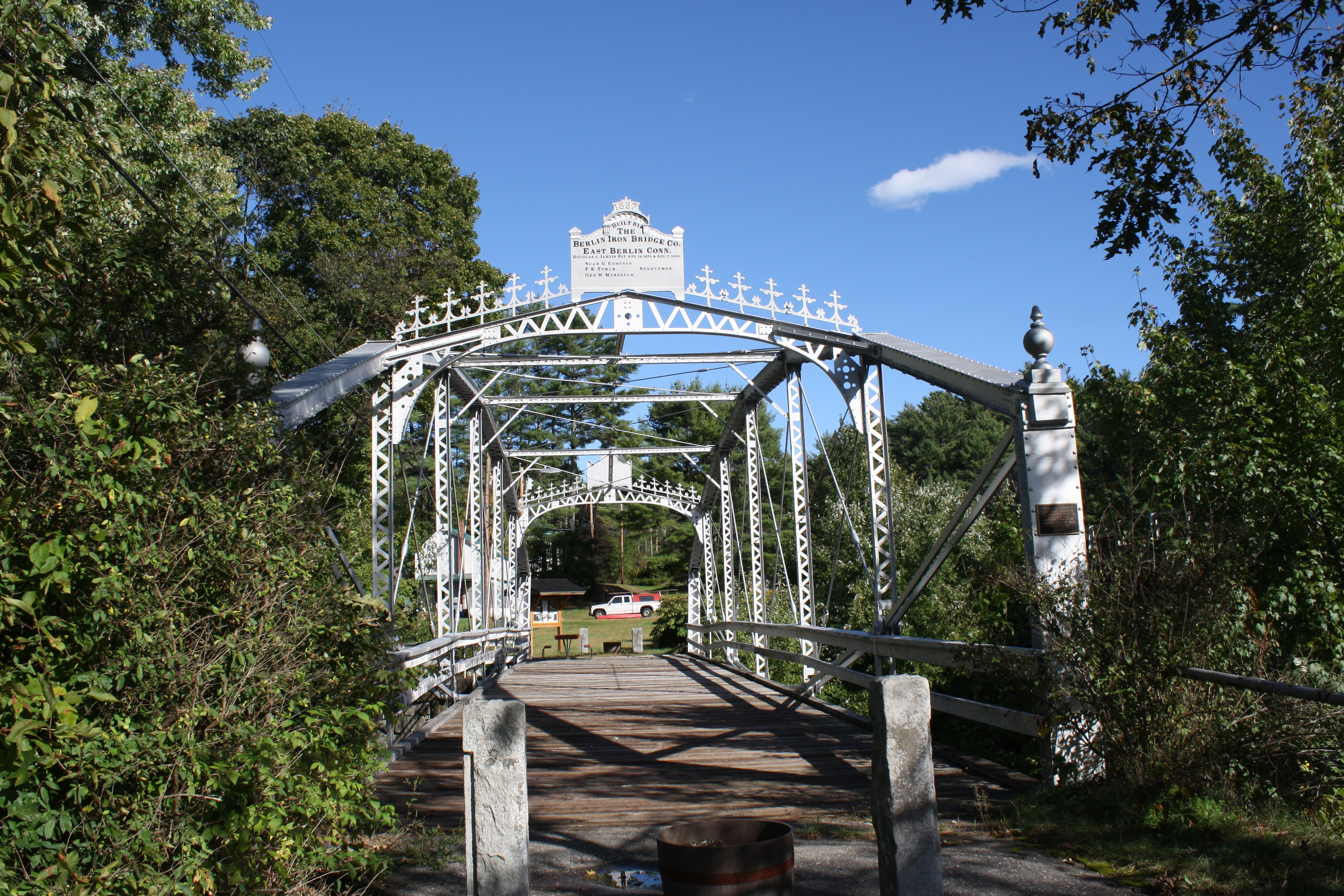

- Location within New Hampshire Location within the United States
- Location: 0.15 mi. E of NH 28 on Depot Rd., Chichester, New Hampshire
- Coordinates: 43°15′26″N 71°22′12″W
- Area: less than one acre
- Built: 1887
- Built by: Berlin Iron Bridge Co.; Douglas, William O.
- Architectural style: Lenticular Through Truss
- NRHP reference No.: 04000149
- Added to NRHP: March 10, 2004

The Pineground Bridge, also known as the Depot Road Bridge or the Thunder Bridge, is a through-type lenticular truss bridge that formerly carried Depot Road over the Suncook River in Chichester, New Hampshire. The bridge was built in 1887 by the Berlin Iron Bridge Co., and is the only one of its type (and only one of for lenticular truss bridges of any type, as of 2004) in the state. It is 96 feet (29 m) long and 16 feet (4.9 m) wide, and rises 15 feet (4.6 m) above the river. It is mounted on abutments made of unmortared ashlar granite. The decking and rails are made of wood. The bridge has not undergone major alterations since its construction. Some of its stringers were replaced during the 1981–82 restoration, wooden parts were also replaced, and a number of decorative parts have been lost over the years.

The bridge was built on the site of earlier bridges that gave access to the "pine ground", an area with a large number of pine trees, and the eventual site of a saw mill. When the railroad arrived in the area in the late 1860s, Depot Road was run across the bridge to connect the town to the station. The previous bridge, in bad condition even before the arrival of the railroad, was probably subjected to heavier traffic afterward, and the town decided to replace it in 1887. The bridge was closed to vehicular traffic in 1978 and restored for pedestrian, bicycle, and snowmobile use in 1981–82.

The bridge was listed on the National Register of Historic Places in 2004.

== See also ==
- List of bridges on the National Register of Historic Places in New Hampshire
- National Register of Historic Places listings in Merrimack County, New Hampshire
