= Town Bridge =

- U.S. National Register of Historic Places
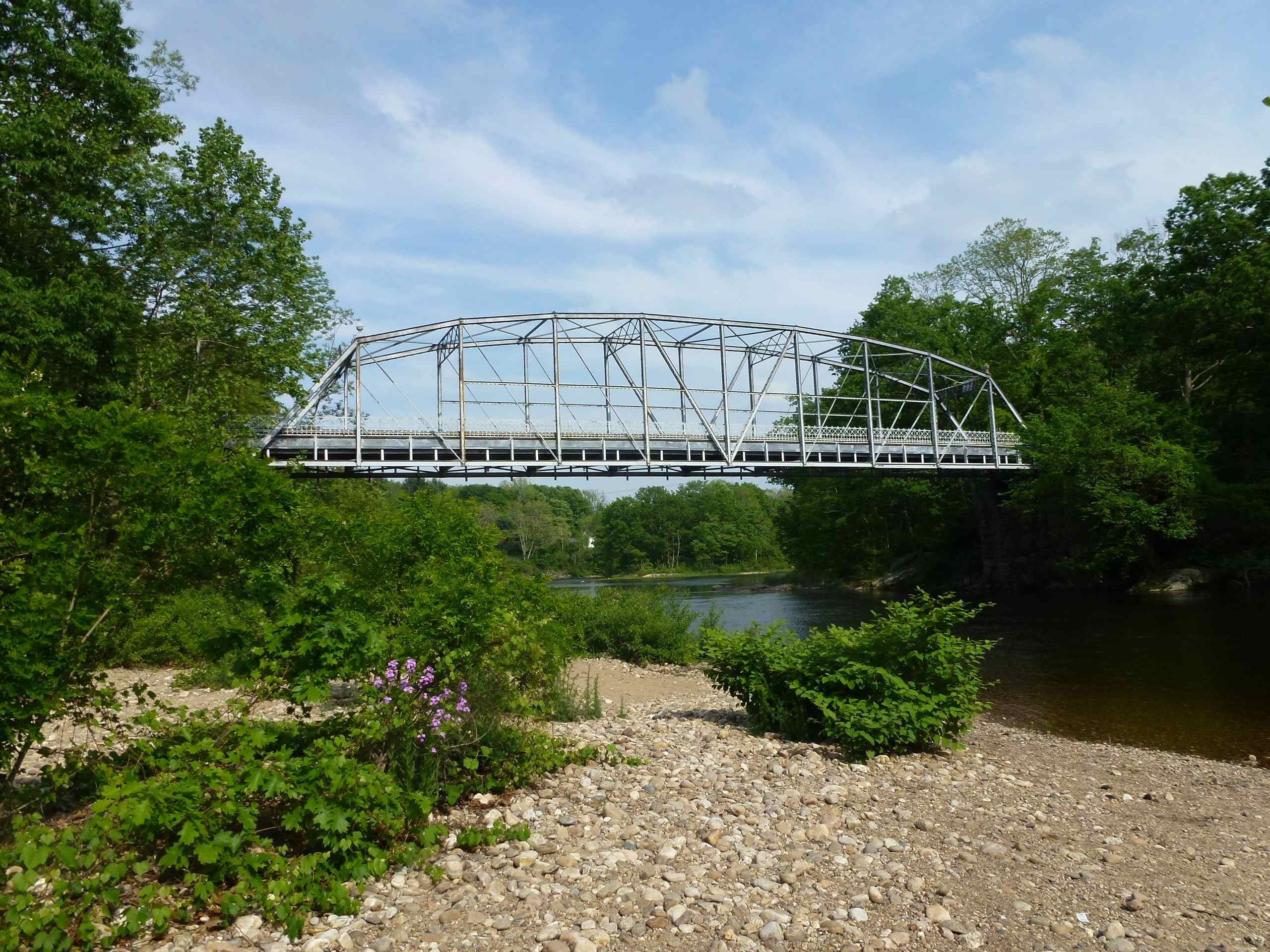

- Location within Connecticut Location within the United States
- Location: Town Bridge Road over the Farmington River, Canton, Connecticut
- Coordinates: 41°49′28″N 72°55′43″W
- Area: less than one acre
- Built: 1895
- Built by: Berlin Iron Bridge Company
- Architectural style: Parker through truss
- NRHP reference No.: 99000923
- Added to NRHP: August 5, 1999

The Town Bridge is a historic truss bridge, carrying Town Bridge Road over the Farmington River in Canton, Connecticut. Built in 1895, it is one of only two surviving pin-connected Parker truss bridges in the state. It was listed on the National Register of Historic Places in 1999.

== Description and history ==
The Town Bridge is located in a rural-residential setting of southwestern Canton, north of the village of Collinsville and about 0.1 miles (0.16 km) west of Connecticut Route 179 on Town Bridge Road. It is a single-span Parker truss, with a total length of about 172 feet (52 m), and a height above the river of about 12.5 feet (3.8 m). It has a metal deck covered in asphalt, and carries a single lane of traffic. Its entrance portals are adorned with iron cresting.

The bridge was built in 1895 for the town by the Berlin Iron Bridge Company, Connecticut's leading manufacturer of iron bridges at the time. The bridge is distinctive for a number of reasons. It is the only surviving Berlin bridge in the state that is not of lenticular truss design, which then predominated in the company's production, and is one of less than two dozen Berlin bridges left in the state (out of more than 100 originally built). It is one of only two Parker trusses with pinned connections, a method of connecting the truss members that gave way to riveted connections (also present on this structure) by about 1900. The bridge was built as part of a town program to improve all of its crossings of the swift-flowing and flood-prone Farmington River.

== See also ==
- National Register of Historic Places listings in Hartford County, Connecticut
- List of bridges on the National Register of Historic Places in Connecticut
