= Berlin Iron Bridge Co. =

American company (1868–1900)

Berlin Iron Bridge Company
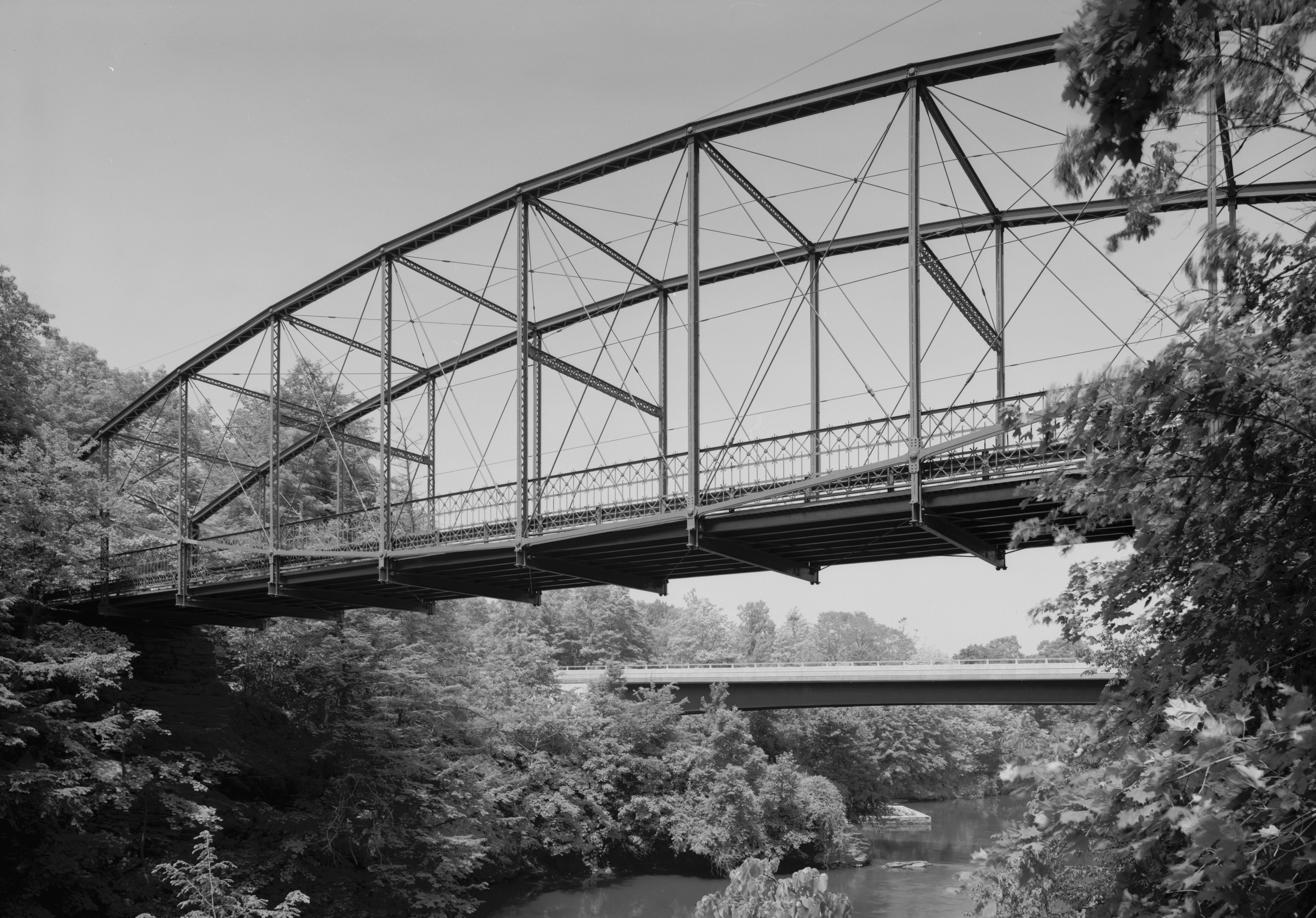
- The Lover's Leap Bridge in New Milford, Connecticut, built by the company in 1895
- Founded: 1868 in Berlin, Connecticut
- Defunct: 1900
- Fate: Acquired
- Successors: American Bridge Company, Berlin Steel
- Headquarters: Berlin, Connecticut
- Services: Bridge construction

The Berlin Iron Bridge Company was a Berlin, Connecticut company that built iron bridges and buildings that were supported by iron. It is credited as the architect of numerous bridges and buildings now listed on the U.S. National Register of Historic Places. It eventually became part of the American Bridge Company.

== History ==
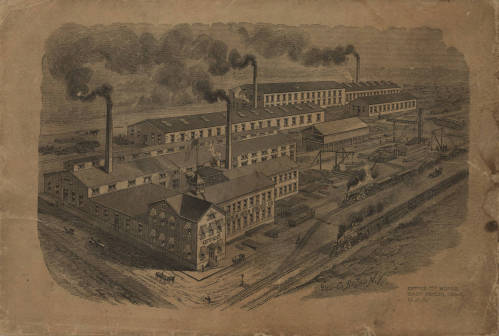
Illustration of East Berlin Iron Works Co. Office and Work

The Berlin Iron Bridge Company began in 1868 as the Corrugated Metal Company, a branch of tinware firm Roys and Wilcox, which is now part of Roper Whitney. Originally producing roofing and shutters, the company became involved in roof trusses. In 1878, under Samuel C. Wilcox, the company purchased the rights to the "parabolic" (lenticular truss) bridge patent from William Douglas. Douglas became treasurer and executive manager of the company. In 1885 he received another patent, and the company name was changed to Berlin Iron Bridge Company.

The Berlin Iron Bridge Company constructed hundreds of bridges across the eastern United States, until 1900, when the company was acquired by the American Bridge Company.

=== Berlin Steel ===
Almost immediately after its acquisition by the American Bridge Company, three executives from the Berlin Iron Bridge Company split from American Bridge and formed their own company, the Berlin Construction Company. The new company continued in the path of the Berlin Iron Bridge Company and continued building bridges until the 1930s. In 1962 it was renamed to the Berlin Steel Construction Company, and still exists today. Several of their bridges have also been listed on the National Register of Historic Places.

== Bridges ==
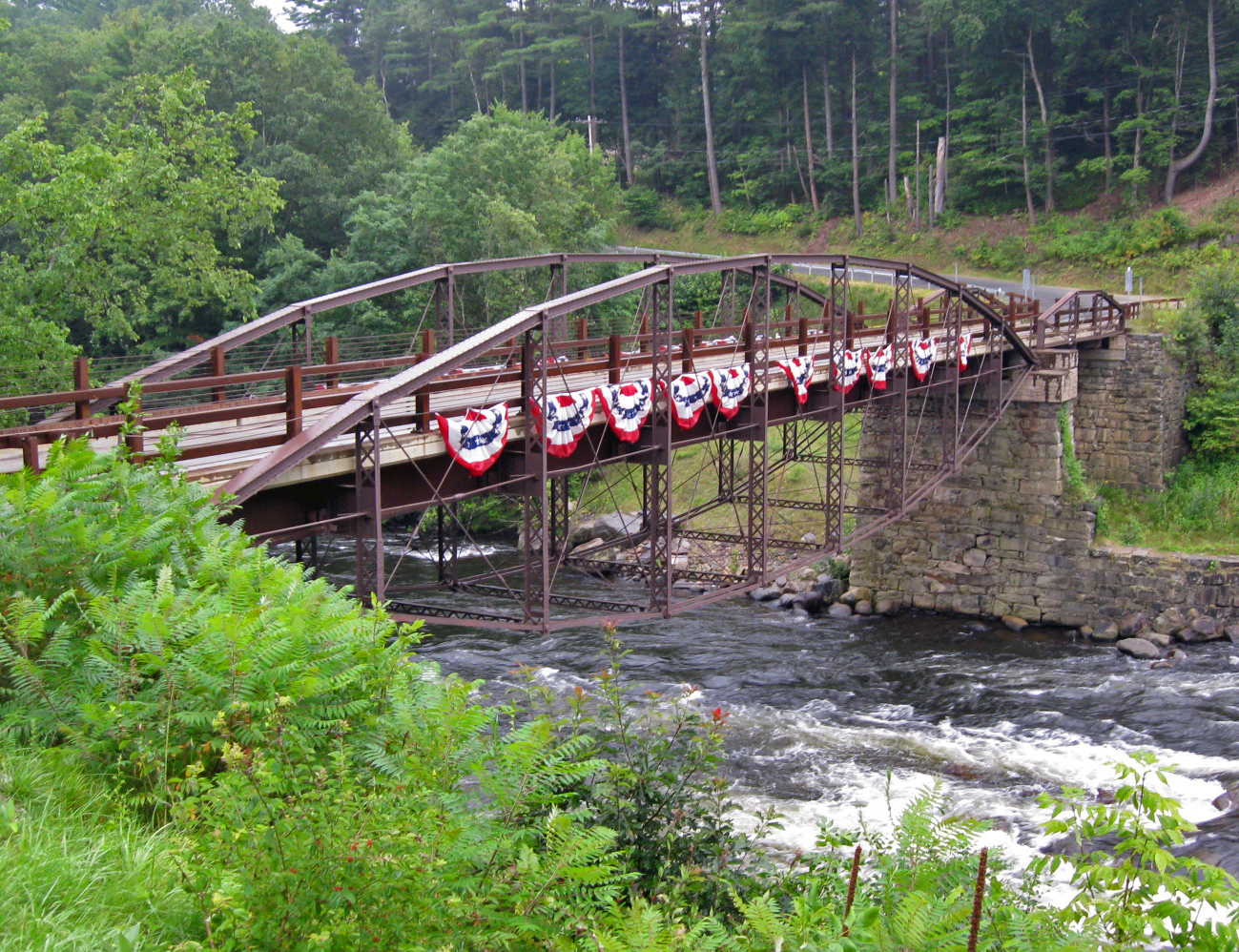
Hadley Parabolic Bridge

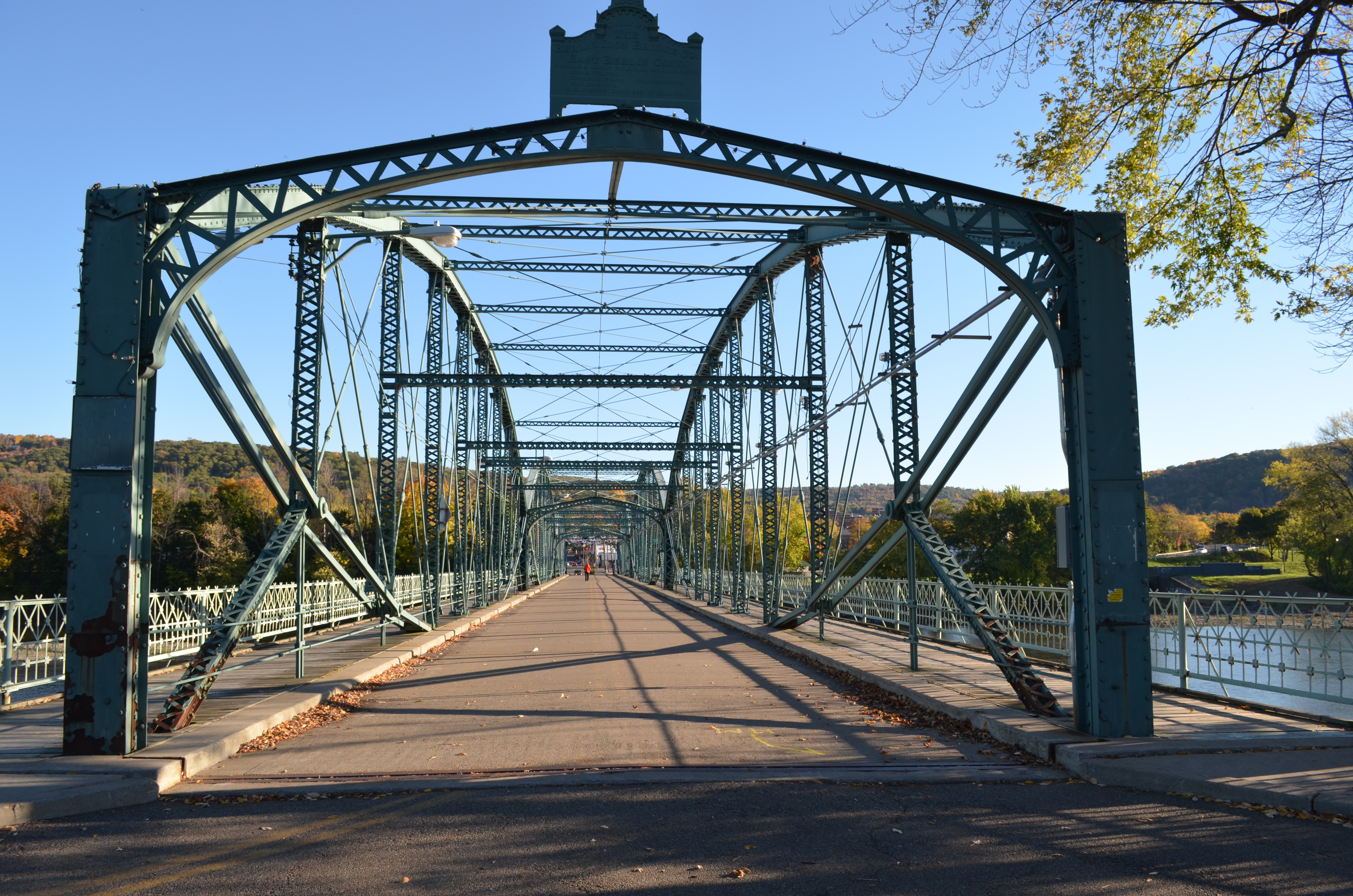
South Washington Street Parabolic Bridge

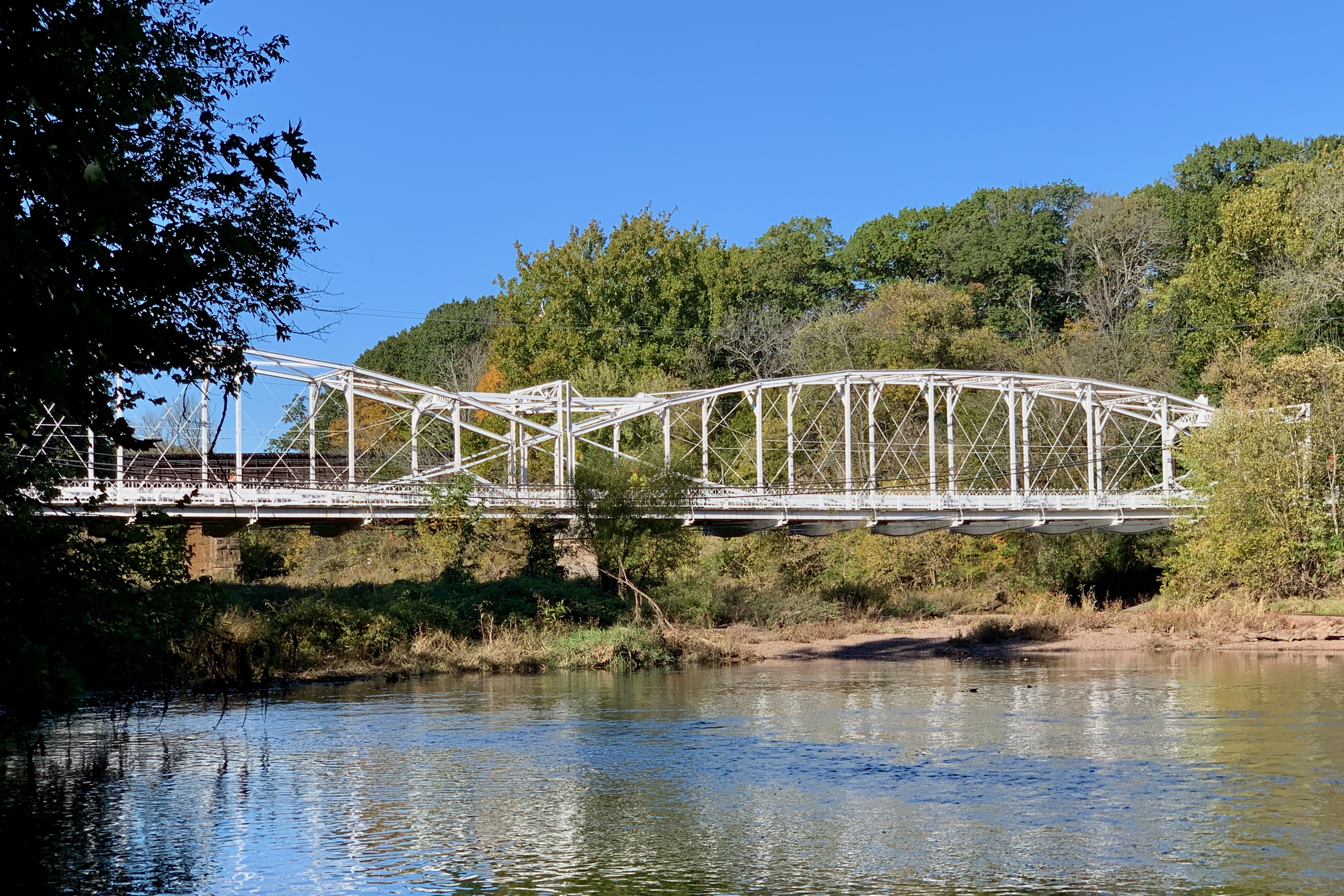
Neshanic Station Lenticular Truss Bridge

- Mattabesset River Bridge (c.1880s or 1890s), abandoned lenticular pony-truss in Connecticut spanning the Mattabesset River between Cromwell and Berlin
- Berlin Bridge (1880) over Webutuck Creek, a lenticular truss bridge manufactured in 1880 and shipped to the area for installation by local residents, NRHP-listed
- Bardwell's Ferry Bridge (1882), a lenticular truss bridge over the Deerfield River, Conway, Massachusetts, NRHP-listed
- Sheffield Street Bridge (1884), carries Sheffield Street over Hancock Brook in Waterbury, Connecticut, NRHP-listed
- Interlaken Mill Bridge (1885), Rhode Island, built 1885 spanning the Pawtuxet River, NRHP-listed
- Hadley Parabolic Bridge (1885), only survivor of only three iron semi-deck lenticular truss bridges to have been built (in New York State or in the world?), CR 1, Hadley, NY, NRHP-listed
- Interlaken Mill Bridge (1885), spanning the Pawtuxet River at Arkwright, Coventry, RI, NRHP-listed
- Golden Hill Bridge (c.1885), only known surviving bridge to implement modifications to the pony truss design patented by William O. Douglas in 1885, Golden Hill Rd. over the Housatonic River, Lee, MA, NRHP-listed
- Glen Falls Bridge (1886), Brunswick Ave. over the Moosup River, Plainfield, CT, NRHP-listed
- Raymondville Parabolic Bridge (1886), a lenticular truss bridge spanning the Raquette River, Raymondville, NY, NRHP-listed
- South Washington Street Parabolic Bridge (1886), a lenticular truss bridge, S. Washington St., Binghamton, New York, NRHP-listed
- Ashland Mill Bridge (1886), over the Pachaug River, near Ashland St., Griswold, CT, formerly NRHP-listed
- Douglas & Jarvis Patent Parabolic Truss Iron Bridge (1887), Rte. 2 over the Missisquoi River, Highgate Falls, VT, NRHP-listed
- Pineground Bridge (1887), 0.15 mi. E of NH 28 on Depot Rd., Chichester, NH, NRHP-listed
- Boardman's Bridge (1888), Boardman Rd. over the Housatonic River, NW of New Milford, CT, NRHP-listed
- Main Street Bridge (1888), now a footbridge only, carried Main St. over the Rippowam River, Stamford, CT, NRHP-listed
- Melrose Road Bridge (1888), Melrose Rd. over the Scantic River, East Windsor, CT, NRHP-listed
- Ouaquaga Lenticular Truss Bridge (1888), a lenticular truss bridge over the Susquehanna River, Ouaquaga, NY, NRHP-listed
- Swing Bridge (1888), over the Ausable River, between Clinton and S. Ausable Sts., Keeseville, NY, NRHP-listed
- Town Line Bridge (1888), located in the town of Taylor in Cortland County, New York, NRHP-listed
- Hilborn Iron Bridge (1890), State Rte 414 over the Pine Creek, Cedar Run, PA.
- Minortown Road Bridge (1890), Minortown Rd. over the Nonewaug River, Woodbury, CT, NRHP-listed
- Walton Bridge (c. 1890), Dr. Ray Rd. access over the Ausable River, Keene, NY, NRHP-listed
- Waterville Bridge (1890), moved in 1985, now brings the Appalachian Trail over Swatara Creek, Swatara Gap, PA, NRHP-listed
- Red Bridge (1891), near Oregon Rd. over the Quinnipiac River, Meriden, CT, NRHP-listed
- Main Street Bridge (1891), spanning the Tankerhoosen River in Talcottville (Vernon), CT
- Rice Farm Road Bridge (1892), Town Hwy. 62, off VT 30, Dummerston, VT, NRHP-listed
- Turn-of-River Bridge (1892), Old N. Stamford Rd. at the Rippowam River, Stamford, CT. A small lenticular pony truss bridge, NRHP-listed
- Lover's Leap Bridge (1895), a wrought-iron lenticular truss bridge over the Housatonic River, S of New Milford on Pumpkin Hill Rd., New Milford, CT, NRHP-listed
- Town Bridge (1895), over the Farmington River, Canton, CT, NRHP-listed
- Neshanic Station Lenticular Truss Bridge (1896), over the South Branch Raritan River, Neshanic Station, New Jersey, NRHP-listed
- Joseph R. Ouellette Bridge (aka, "Aiken Street Bridge," 1883) over the Merrimack River, Lowell, Massachusetts. Named for the Korean War Veteran and Medal of Honor recipient, and referred to in multiple Jack Kerouac works and published personal writings including Visions of Gerard, (1963). This is the longest lenticular truss bridge in the United States, with 5 spans, as well as the second-oldest lenticular truss bridge in Massachusetts Situated within the Lowell National Historical Park District.
- Several bridges in San Antonio, TX, including the Brackenridge Park Bridge (1890), the Augusta Street Bridge (1890), and the Crockett Street Bridge (1891).

== Buildings ==
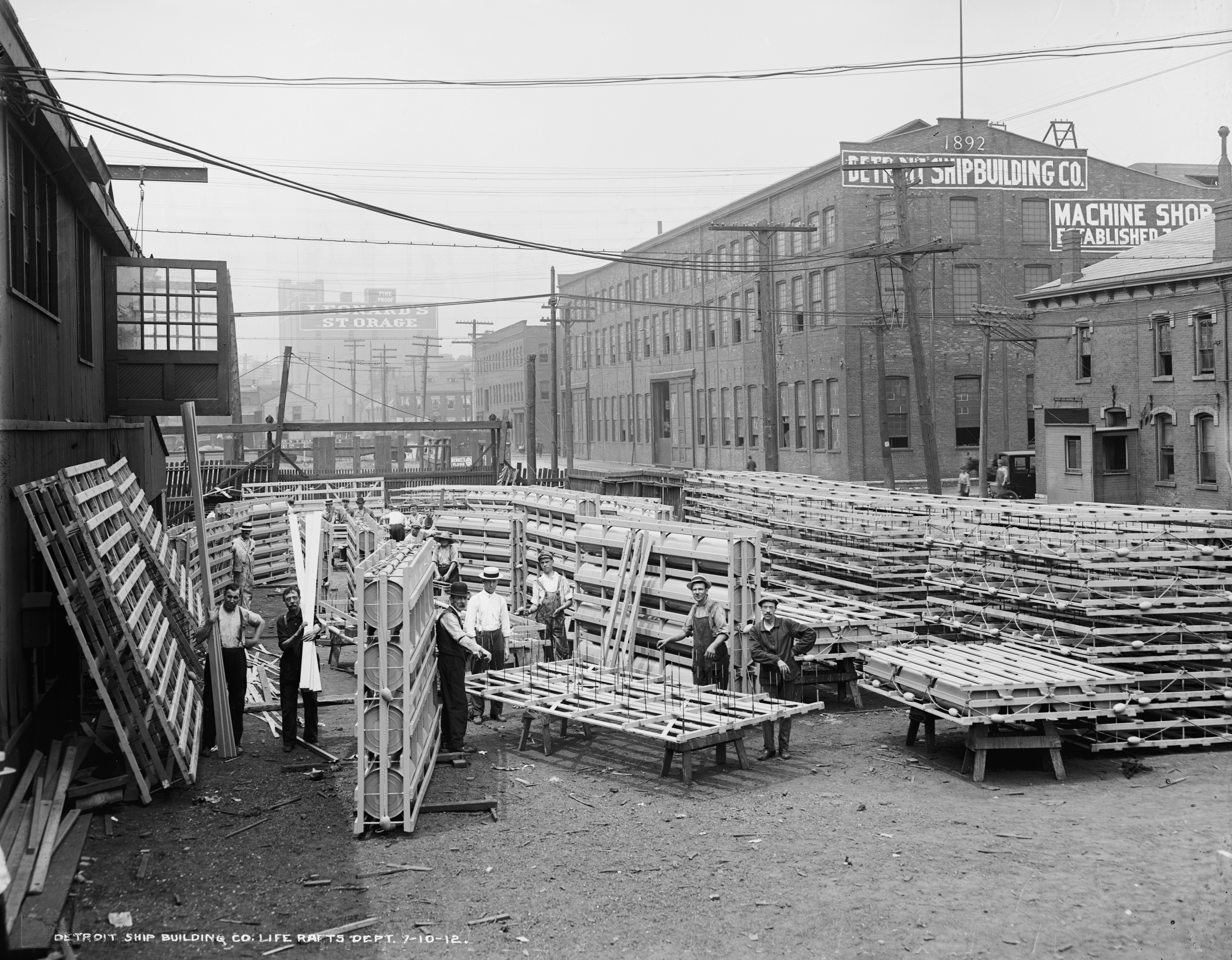
Detroit Dry Dock Company's machine shop in 1912 (right background), built in 1892

- Dry Dock Engine Works Machine Shop (1892), novel early example of building with load-bearing steel frame with non-load-bearing brick curtain walls, Detroit, Michigan
- Providence Gas Company Purifier House (1900), 200 Allens Ave., Providence, RI, NRHP-listed
- Beaman and Smith Company Mill (1898), steel-framed brick building at 20 Gordon Ave., Providence, RI, NRHP-listed
- Capewell Horse Nail Company (1903), 60-70 Popieluszko St., Hartford, CT, NRHP-listed (Berlin Iron Works)
