= Providence Gas Company Purifier House =

Historic building in Rhode Island, United States

- U.S. National Register of Historic Places
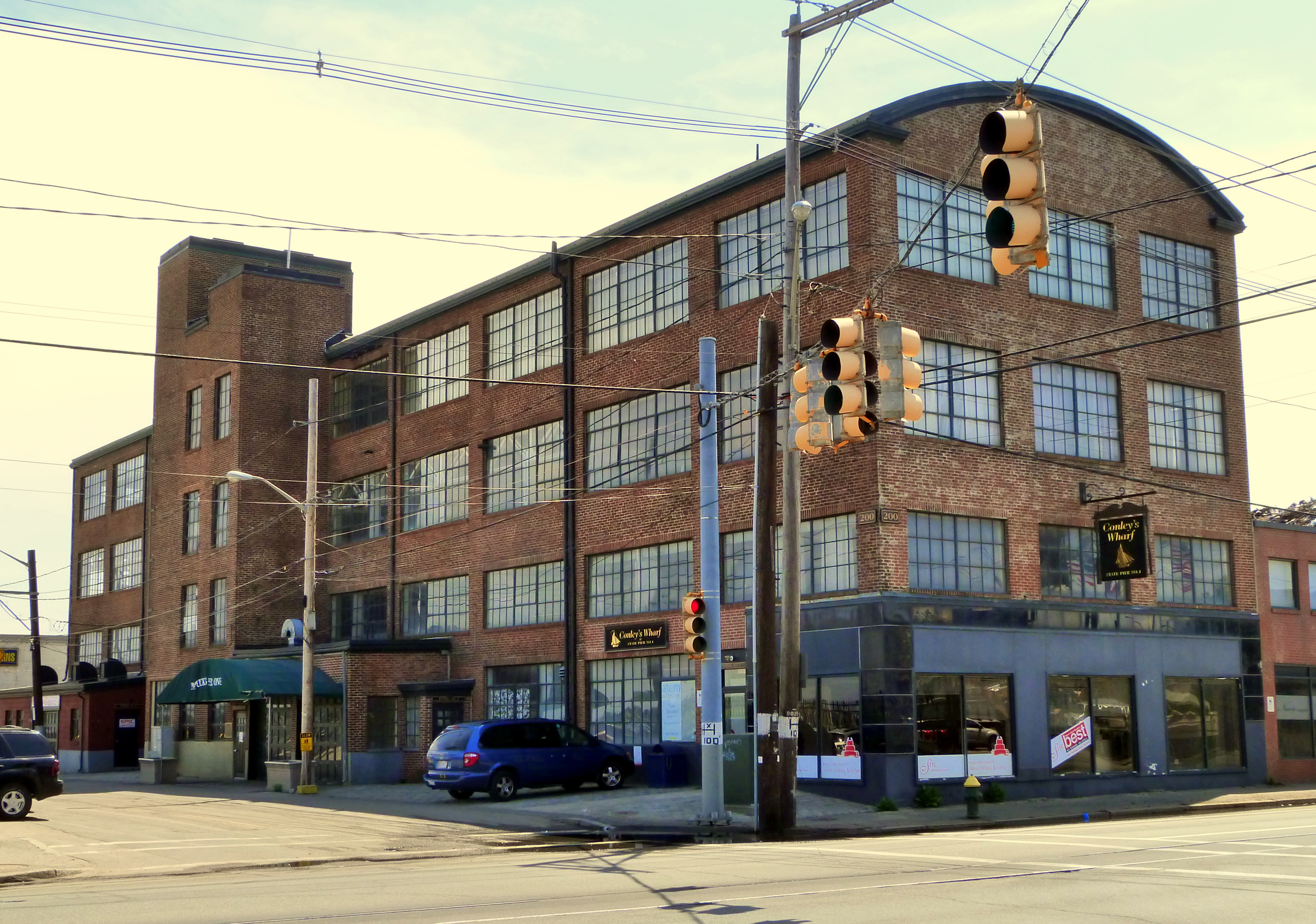
- The Providence Gas Company Purifier House in 2015

- Location within Rhode Island Location within the United States
- Location: 200 Allens Avenue; Providence, Rhode Island
- Coordinates: 41°48′29″N 71°24′11″W
- Area: 0.7 acres (0.28 ha)
- Built: 1900
- Architect: Berlin Iron Bridge Co.; Bigney, C.I. Construction Co.
- Architectural style: Early Commercial
- NRHP reference No.: 07000589
- Added to NRHP: June 21, 2007

The Providence Gas Company Purifier House (Imperial Warehouse Company; City Tire Company) is a historic building at 200 Allens Avenue (corner of Public Street) in Providence, Rhode Island. It is a large four-story steel-and-concrete structure, built in 1900 by the Berlin Iron Bridge Company, early in the era of steel frame construction. It was used for the gasification of coal until about 1940, when it was purchased by the City Tire Company, which occupied it until 2000. The building has been rehabilitated and converted for a variety of other uses.

The building was listed on the National Register of Historic Places in 2007.

== See also ==
- National Register of Historic Places listings in Providence, Rhode Island
