= Beaman and Smith Company Mill =

- U.S. National Register of Historic Places
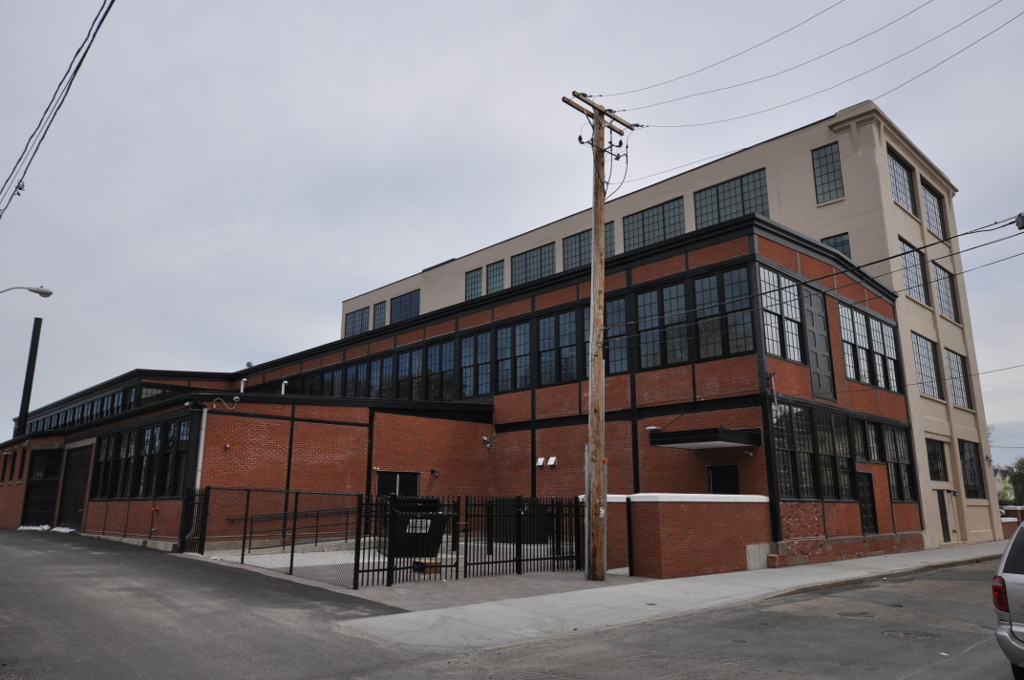

- Location within Rhode Island Location within the United States
- Location: Providence, Rhode Island
- Coordinates: 41°48′16″N 71°24′57″W
- Built: 1898
- Architect: Berlin Iron Bridge Company; Jenks & Ballou
- NRHP reference No.: 06000299
- Added to NRHP: April 20, 2006

The Beaman and Smith Company Mill is an historic factory complex at 20 Gordon Avenue in Providence, Rhode Island.

== History ==
The Beaman Smith Company Mill was built in 1886 by Elmer A. Beaman and George-H. Smith for the manufacturing metal-working machine tools. The building consists of two masonry buildings at the junction of Gordon and Saratoga Streets in south Providence. The older of the two buildings is a one-to-two story brick structure, built in 1898 by the Berlin Iron Bridge Company. It has a steel frame, and is about 250 feet (76 m) long. The second building is an early example of concrete slab construction, built in 1917. It was designed by local industrial architecture firm, Jenks & Ballou. It is four stories in height, and is attached to the older building's south face. It originally had a brick surface, but much of this was stuccoed. The brick building presents four bays to Gordon Street, while the concrete one has two. The complex exemplifies two notable early modern construction methods, and is a symbol of the industrial development of south Providence in the late 19th century. Beaman and Smith was a manufacturer of precision machine tools; they went out of business in 1926. The complex was occupied for many years by the James Hill Manufacturing Company, who produced metal containers.

The complex was listed on the National Register of Historic Places in 2006.

== See also ==
- National Register of Historic Places listings in Providence, Rhode Island
