= Sheffield Street Bridge =

- U.S. National Register of Historic Places
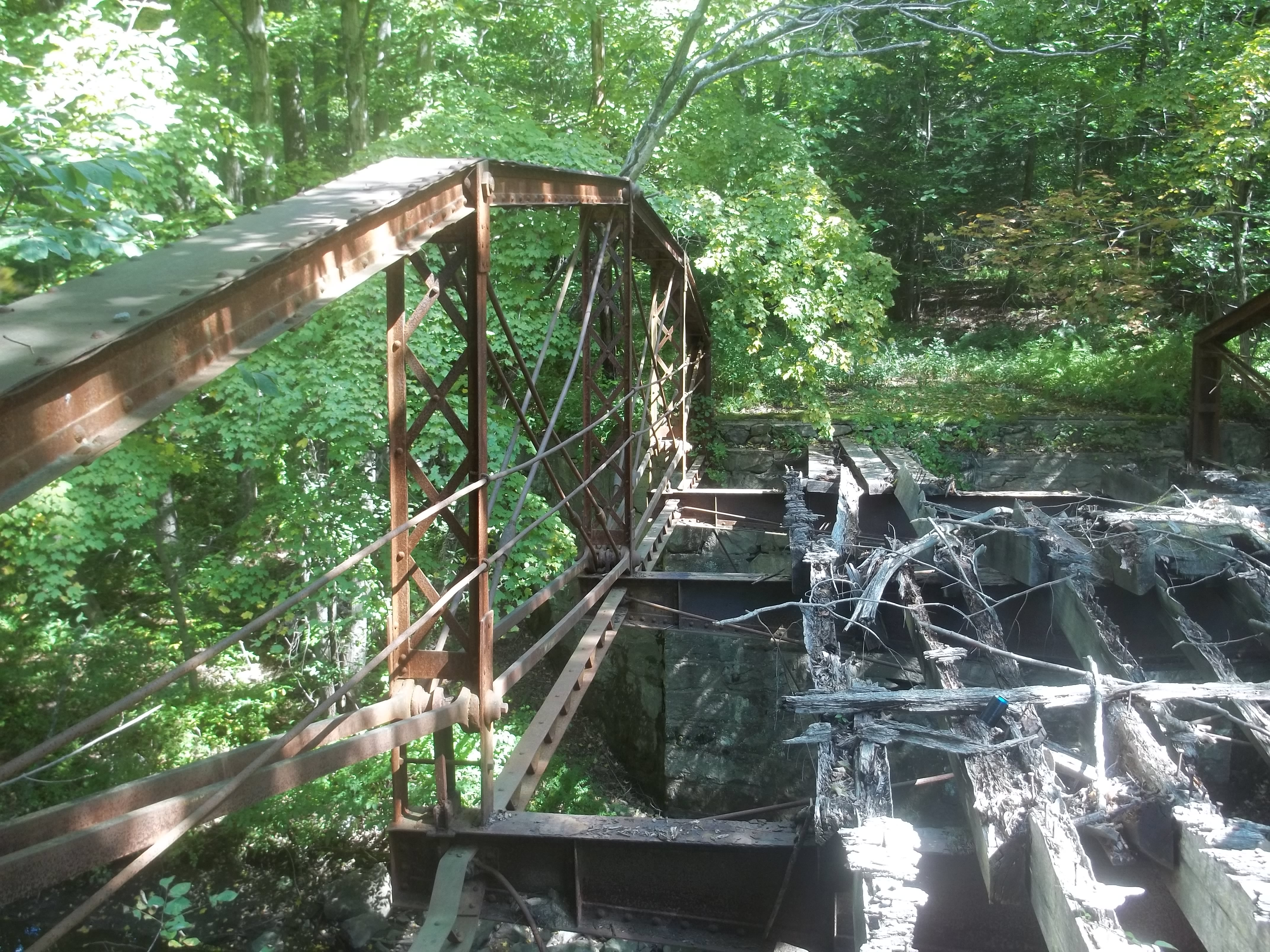

- Location within Connecticut Location within the United States
- Location: Sheffield Street over Hancock Brook, Waterbury, Connecticut
- Coordinates: 41°35′50″N 73°02′52″W
- Area: less than one acre
- Built: 1884
- Built by: Berlin Iron Bridge Co.
- Architectural style: Lenticular pony truss
- NRHP reference No.: 01000353
- Added to NRHP: April 12, 2001

The Sheffield Street Bridge is a historic lenticular truss bridge spanning Hancock Brook in Waterbury, Connecticut, United States. Built in 1884, it is a rare example of a wrought iron bridge built by the Berlin Iron Bridge Co., and one of the few surviving lenticular truss bridges left in the state. It was listed on the National Register of Historic Places in 2001.

== Description and history ==
The Sheffield Street Bridge is located in remote setting in northern Waterbury, off the end of Sheffield Street near a stone quarry. It spans Hancock Brook about 20 feet (6.1 m) above the water, and is mounted on stone abutments. It is 56 feet (17 m) long and 18 feet (5.5 m), and would normally carry two lanes of traffic, if its wooden deck was still usable. Its trusses are fashioned out of four-panel lenticular trusses, supported by posts on the abutments.

The bridge was built in 1884, when this area had a much more substantial industrial presence. It was built by the Berlin Iron Bridge Company, one of the largest makers of steel and iron bridges in New England in the late 19th century. The bridge was deliberately built for heavy-duty use, to serve the industries in the area. Its design is typical of the company's early works, with wrought iron elements of the truss joined by pins instead of rivets. At the time of its listing on the National Register in 2001, it was one of only seventeen surviving lenticular truss bridges in the state, and one of the few that predates a period when their construction became more standardized.

== See also ==
- National Register of Historic Places listings in New Haven County, Connecticut
