= Minortown Road Bridge =

- U.S. National Register of Historic Places
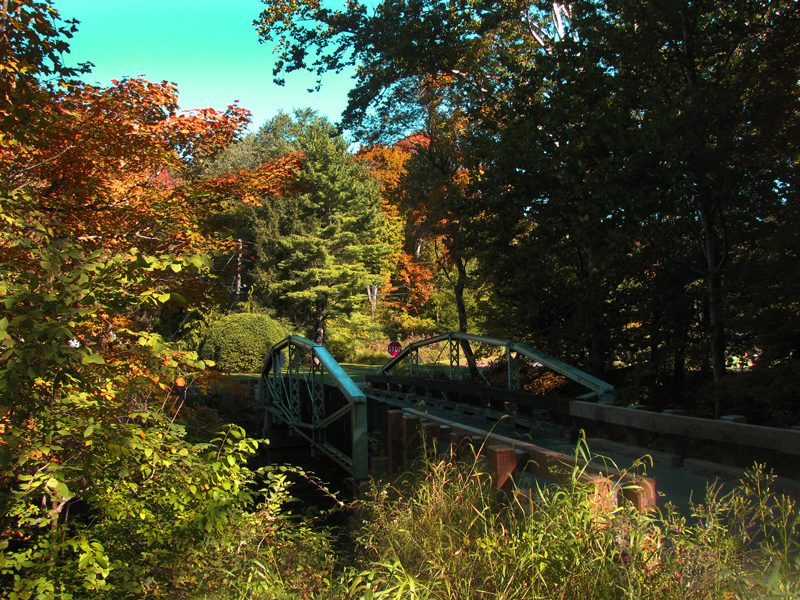

- Location within Connecticut Location within the United States
- Location: Mill Road/Minortown Road over Nonewaug River, Woodbury, Connecticut
- Coordinates: 41°34′36″N 73°10′34″W
- Area: less than one acre
- Built: 1890
- Built by: Berlin Iron Bridge Co.
- Architectural style: Lenticular pony truss
- NRHP reference No.: 01000883
- Added to NRHP: August 17, 2001

The Minortown Road Bridge is a historic lenticular pony truss bridge in northeastern Woodbury, Connecticut. It spans the Nonewaug River, connecting U.S. Route 6 (US 6) to Minortown Road and Mill Road. Built in 1890 by the Berlin Iron Bridge Company, it is one a small number of surviving lenticular truss bridges in the state. It was listed on the National Register of Historic Places in 2001.

== Description and history ==
The Minortown Road Bridge is located in a rural setting of northeastern Woodbury, just south of US 6. It is oriented roughly north-south across the Nonewaug River, which is flanked by US 6 to the north and Minortown and Mill Roads to the south. The bridge is a single-span wrought iron lenticular truss, 64 feet (20 m) long. The trusses are mounted in concrete abutments land on top of the original rubblestone abutments. They no longer carry the active load of the single lane of traffic, which is now supported by a modern timber beam bridge what was built between the two trusses.

The bridge was built in 1890 by the Berlin, Connecticut-based Berlin Iron Bridge Company, one of the major providers of iron and later steel bridges in the northeastern United States. Of the company's many bridges built in Connecticut, this was in 2001 one of seventeen surviving lenticular truss bridges, and one of a smaller number that remain in service in any form. It is distinctive for its use of pins in connecting the truss elements. It was built as part of a town program to upgrade all of its wood-frame bridges. The town paid the company $625 for the trusses and its portion of the bridge construction effort.

== See also ==
- National Register of Historic Places listings in Litchfield County, Connecticut
- List of bridges on the National Register of Historic Places in Connecticut
