= Melrose Road Bridge =

- U.S. National Register of Historic Places
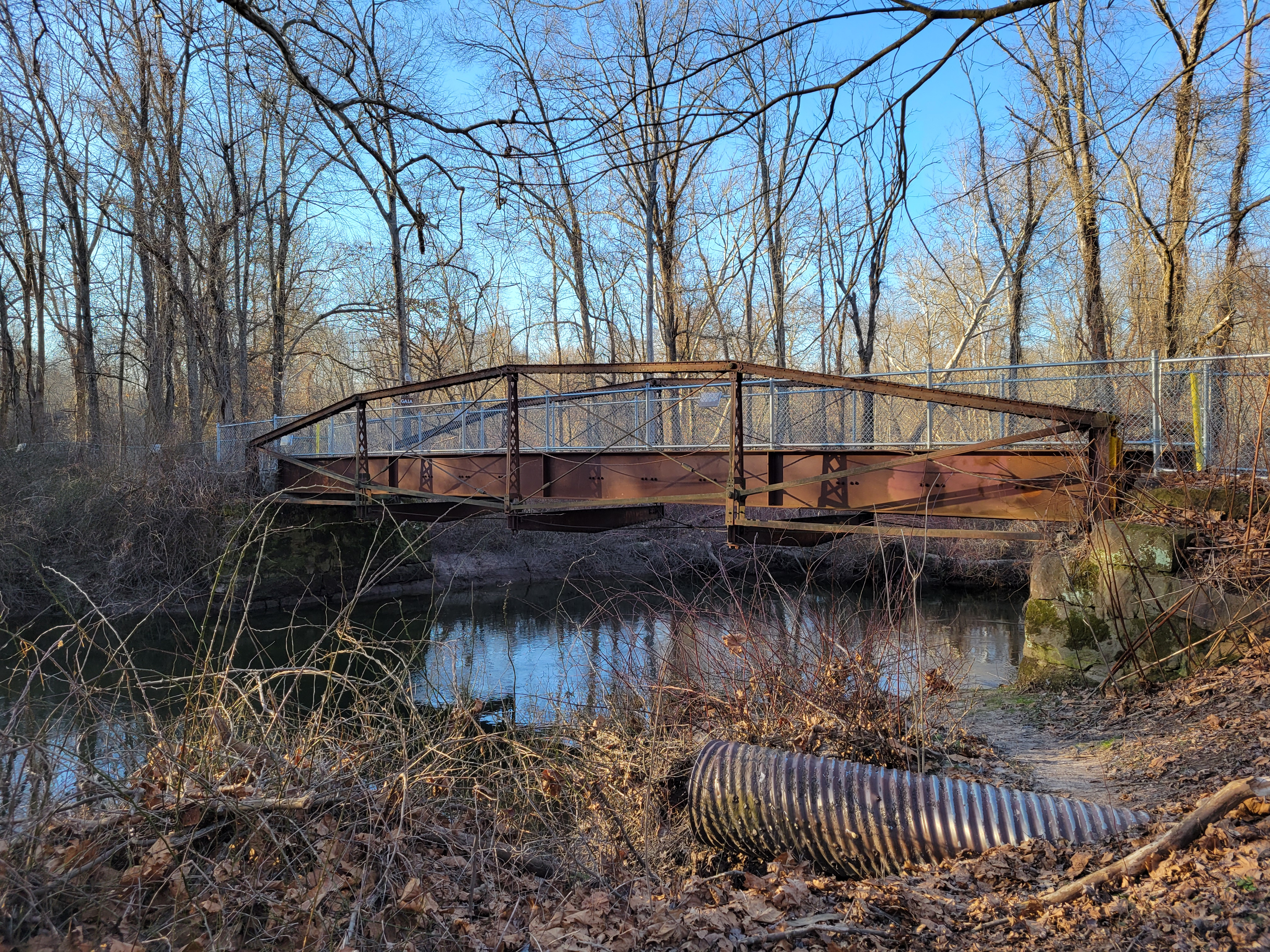
- Melrose Road Bridge with the modern deck in 2024

- Location within Connecticut Location within the United States
- Location: End of Melrose Road over Scantic River, East Windsor, Connecticut
- Coordinates: 41°56′18″N 72°32′51″W
- Built: 1888
- Built by: Berlin Iron Bridge Company
- Architectural style: Lenticular pony truss
- NRHP reference No.: 99000922
- Added to NRHP: August 5, 1999

The Melrose Road Bridge is a historic bridge at the western end of Melrose Road in East Windsor, Connecticut. Built in 1888, it is one of a small number of surviving 19th-century lenticular pony truss bridges in the state. It was listed on the National Register of Historic Places in 1999. It was closed for many years, and lacked stringers and decking. In 2017, the town received an $85,000 state grant to add a new pedestrian deck between the historic trusses and to construct connecting trails.

== Description and history ==
The Melrose Road Bridge is located in a rural area of northeastern East Windsor, at the western end of Melrose Road, where it would otherwise cross the Scantic River. This portion of the river is now part of Scantic River State Park. The bridge now consists of a wrought iron lenticular truss structure, spanning the river and mounted on brownstone abutments. The truss elements are joined by pins. The bridge measures 63 feet (19 m) long and 13 feet (4.0 m) wide, and would be capable of carrying one lane of traffic if rehabilitated. Guardrails have been welded across each of the truss's ends to impede access to the structure, which lacks any sort of decking.

The truss was built in 1888 by the Berlin Iron Bridge Company, one of New England's leading manufacturers of iron bridge trusses of the late 19th century. The truss was purchased by the town for $750, and was assembled and mounted by George Phelps, a local contractor, for $1484. Other contractors were paid $484. At the time of its listing on the National Register in 1999, it was one of only 15 lenticular trusses remaining in the state.

== See also ==
- National Register of Historic Places listings in Hartford County, Connecticut
- List of bridges on the National Register of Historic Places in Connecticut
