= Ouaquaga Lenticular Truss Bridge =

- U.S. National Register of Historic Places
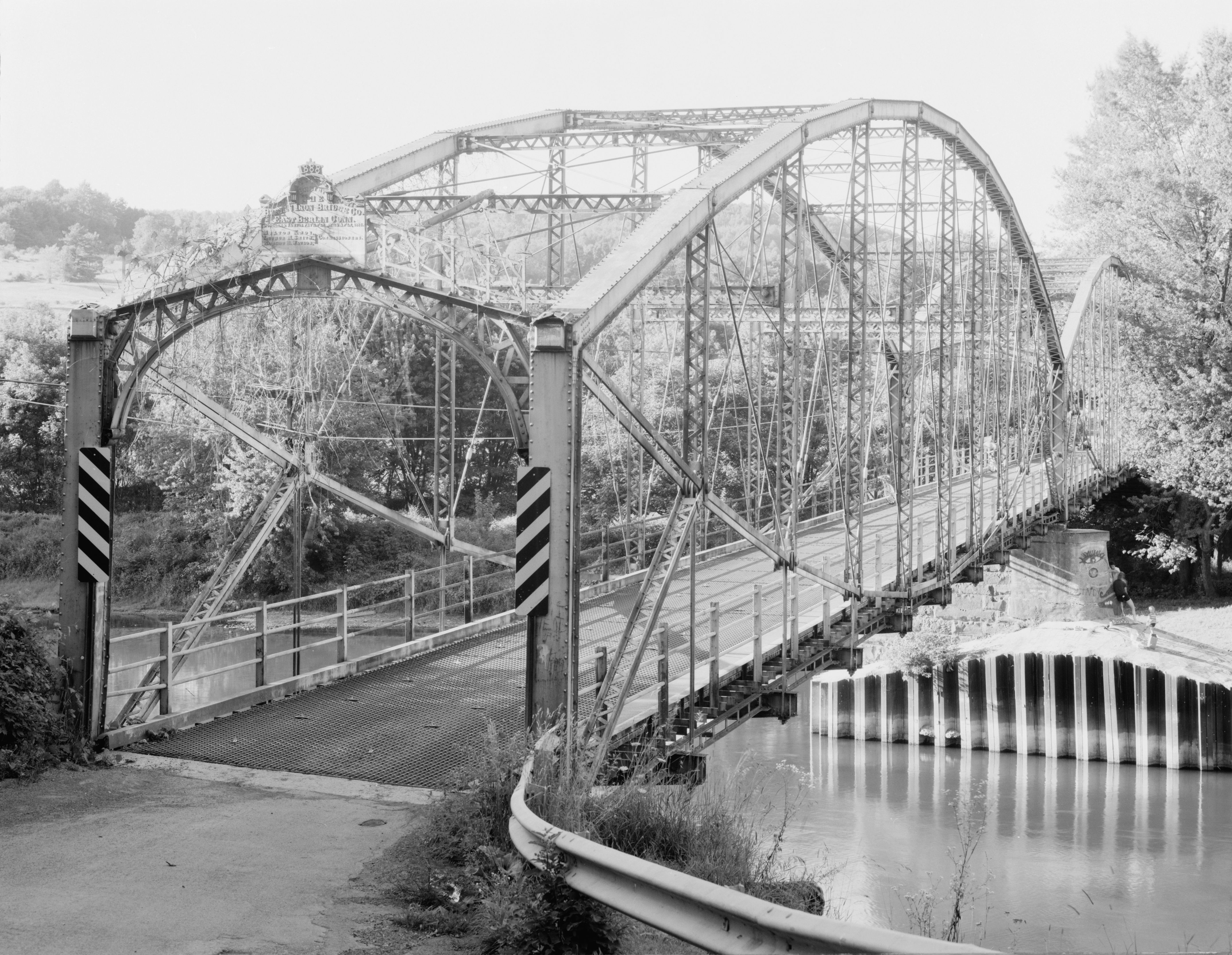
- Ouaquaga Lenticular Truss Bridge, 1987

- Location within New York Location within the United States
- Location: Dutchtown Road over Susquehanna River, Windsor and Colesville, New York
- Coordinates: 42°7′25″N 75°38′50″W
- Area: less than 1 acre (0.40 ha)
- Built: 1888
- Architect: Berlin Iron Bridge Co.
- Architectural style: Lenticular Truss Bridge
- NRHP reference No.: 03000048
- Added to NRHP: February 20, 2003

Ouaquaga Lenticular Truss Bridge is a historic lenticular truss bridge located at Ouaquaga in the towns of Windsor and Colesville in Broome County, New York. It was constructed in 1888 and spans the Susquehanna River. It is composed of two identical through trusses with an overall length of 343 feet (105 m). It was constructed by the Berlin Iron Bridge Co. of East Berlin, Connecticut. The bridge was closed to vehicular traffic in 2008 when a new bridge was built alongside it. The old bridge remains open for pedestrian use.

It was listed on the National Register of Historic Places in 2003.

== Gallery ==
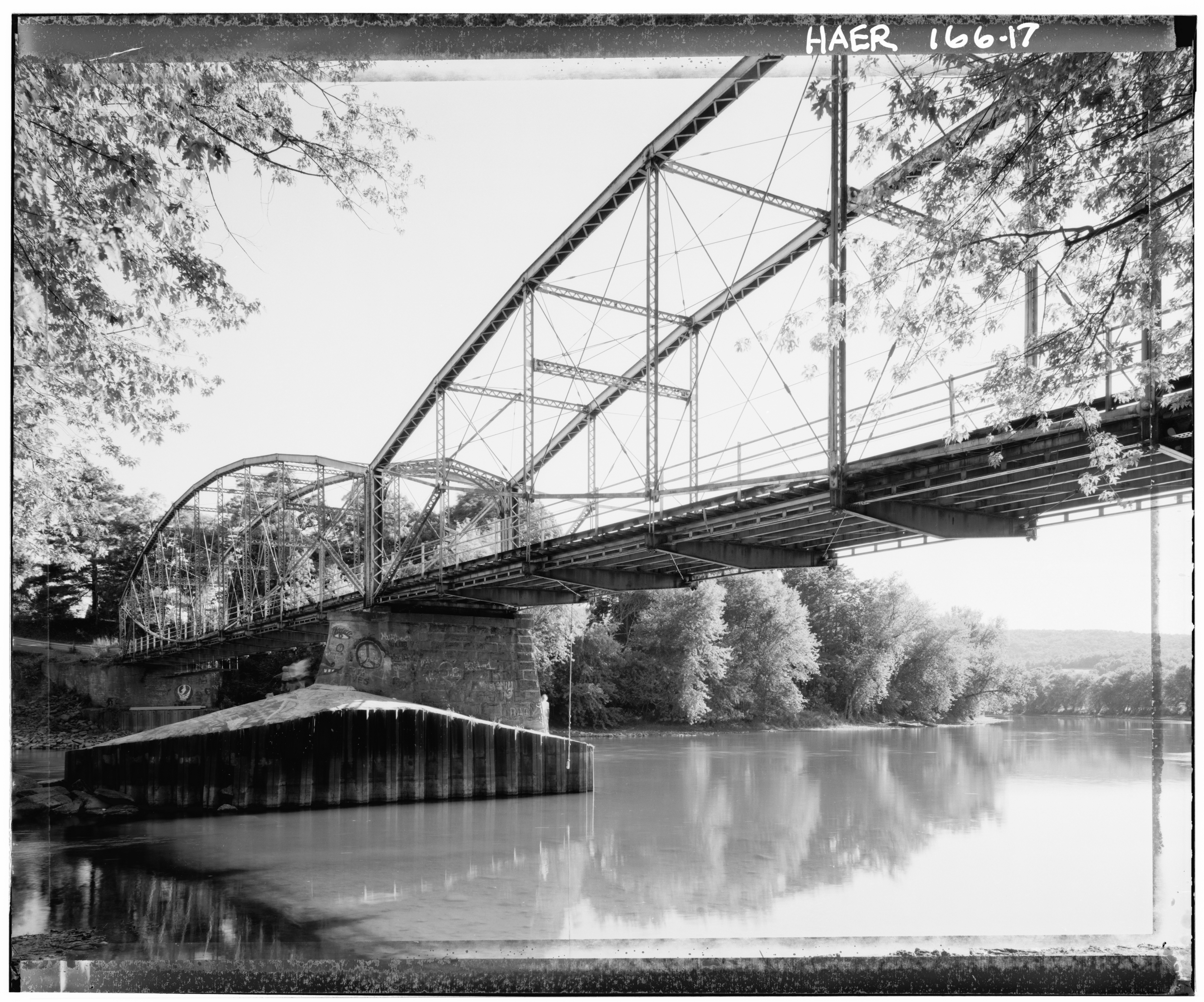
General oblique view from the east side to the southwest

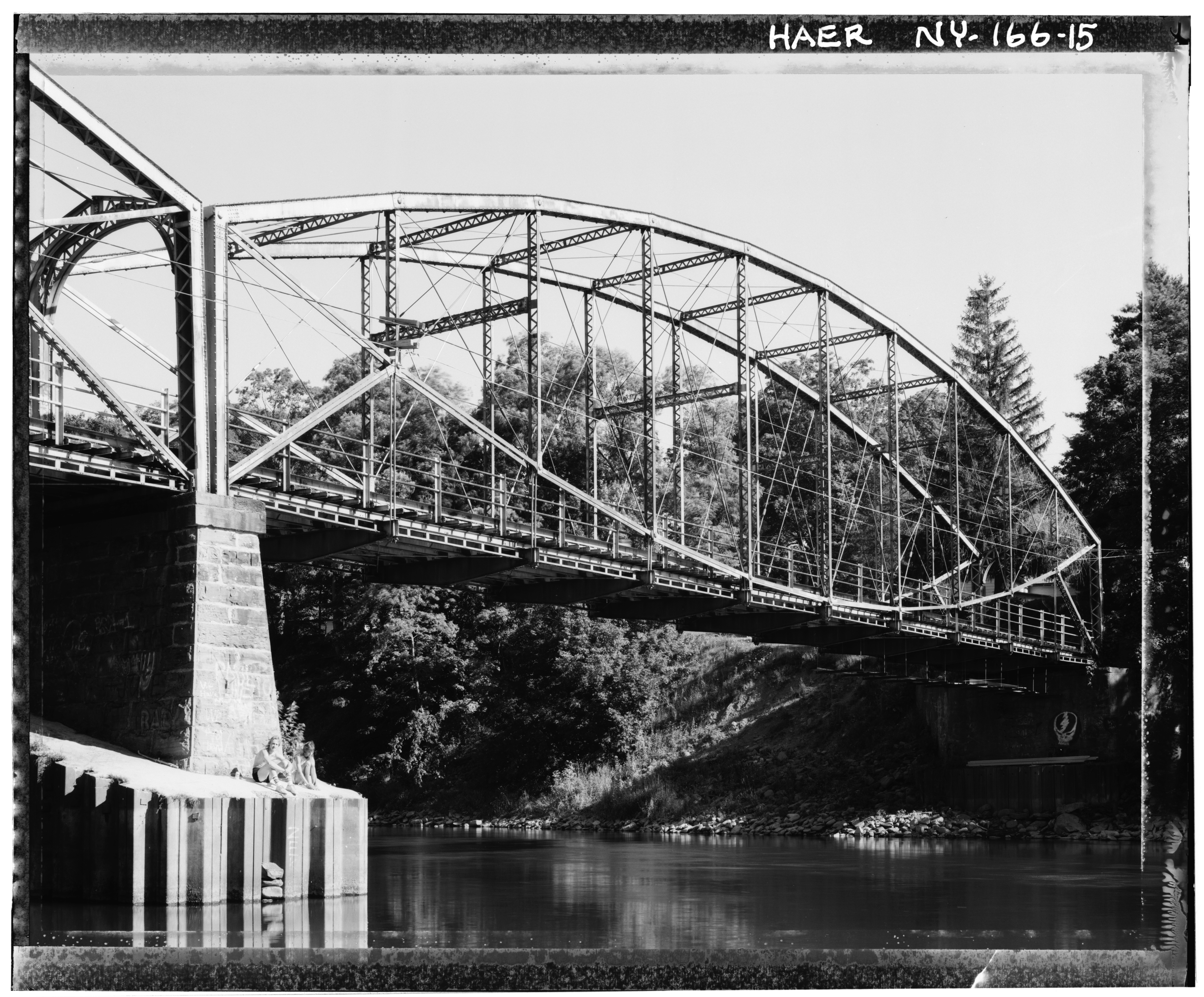
Detail of west truss from below, view to southeast

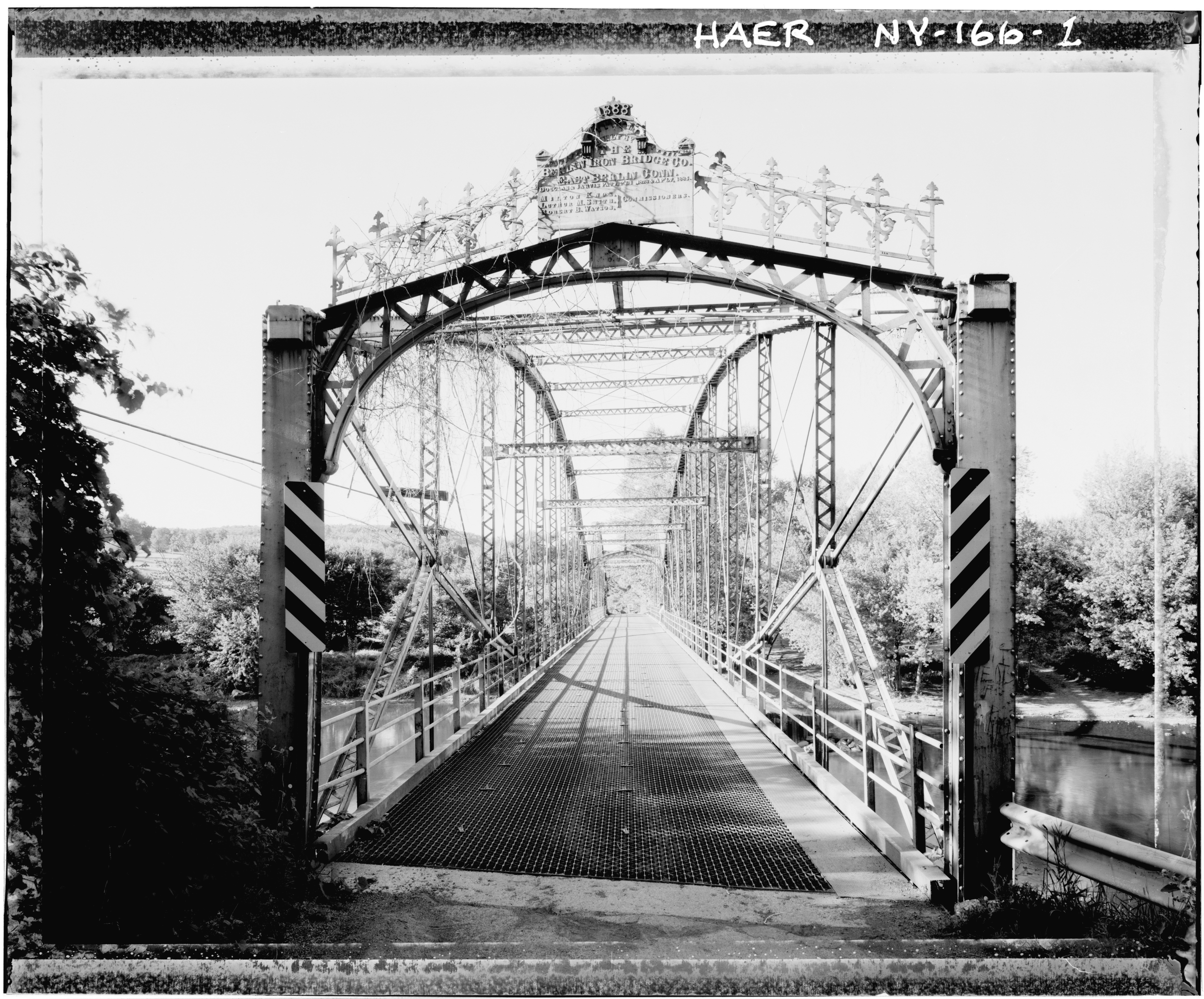
Elevation view of the southeast end, looking northeast

== See also ==
- List of bridges documented by the Historic American Engineering Record in New York (state)
- South Washington Street Parabolic Bridge, a three-span, similar bridge in Binghamton
