= Glen Falls Bridge =

- U.S. National Register of Historic Places
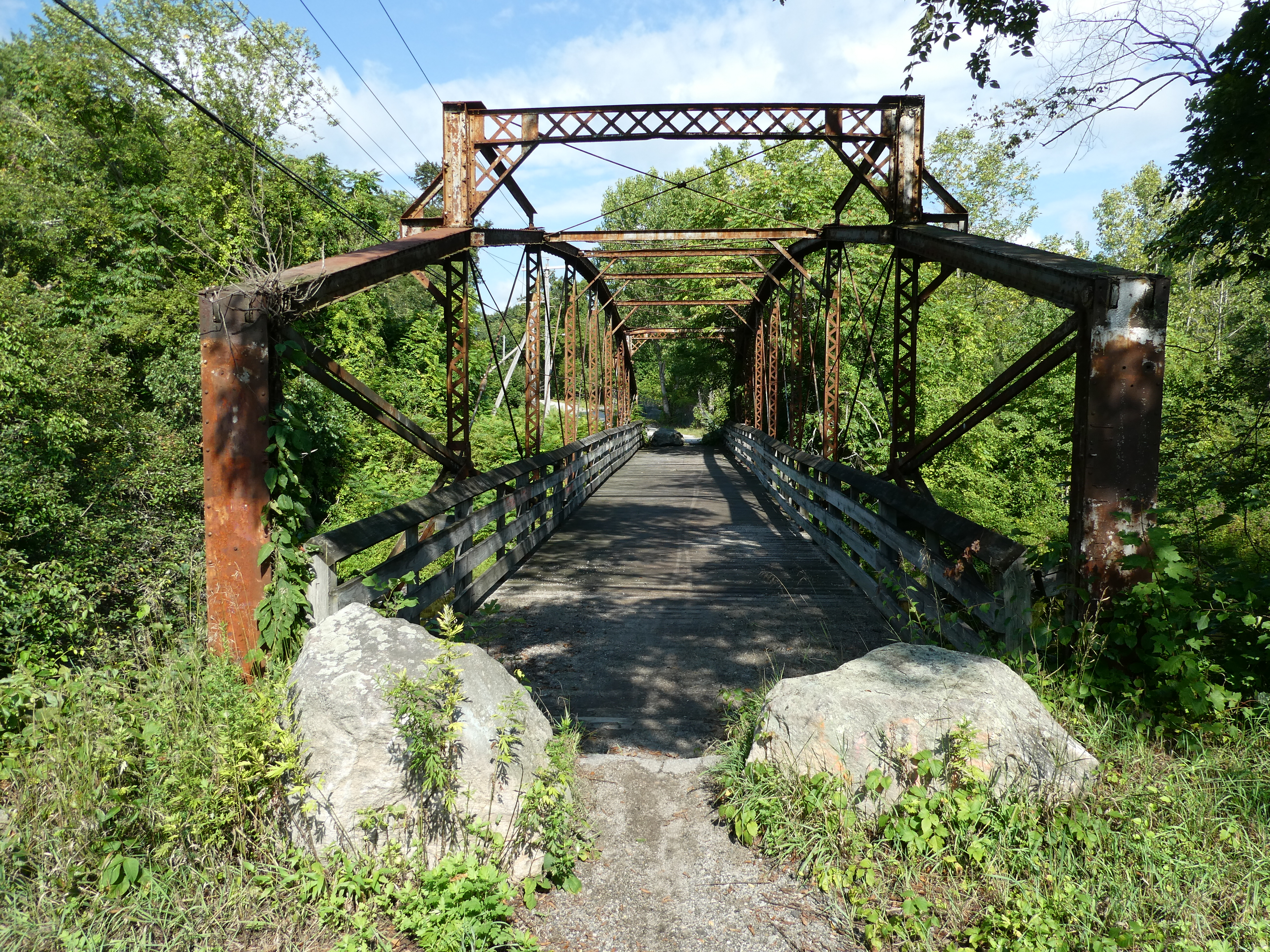
- Glen Falls Bridge in August 2022

- Location within Connecticut Location within the United States
- Location: End of Brunswick Avenue over Moosup River, Plainfield, Connecticut
- Coordinates: 41.717022°N 71.861394°W
- Area: less than one acre
- Built: 1886
- Architect: Berlin Iron Bridge Company
- Architectural style: Lenticular through Truss
- NRHP reference No.: 99000408
- Added to NRHP: April 01, 1999

The Glen Falls Bridge is a historic bridge that formerly carried Brunswick Avenue over the Moosup River in Plainfield, Connecticut. Built in 1886 by the Berlin Iron Bridge Company, it is one of a shrinking number of surviving 19th-century lenticular truss bridges (of hundreds built) in the state. The bridge was listed on the National Register of Historic Places in 1999. It has been closed to all traffic for many years.

== Description and history ==
The Glen Falls Bridge is located on the eastern fringe of the village of Moosup, crossing the Moosup River south of North Main Street (Connecticut Route 14). It is approached from each end by spurs of Brunswick Avenue, with a former 19th-century mill complex just east of the bridge on the north bank of the river. It is a single-span wrought iron lenticular pony truss bridge, 124 feet (38 m) long, and rests on 20th-century reinforced concrete abutments. It has a roadway width of 18 feet (5.5 m), with the trusses rising to a height of about 18 feet (5.5 m) above the road deck, which is about 10 feet (3.0 m) above the river.

The bridge was manufactured by the Berlin Iron Bridge Company in 1886. When built, the road it was on was the main east-west route through the area; it was bypassed by the present alignment of Connecticut Route 14 in 1940. Although the trusses are largely original, portions of them have been replaced in the 20th century, as have the main support posts (portal struts), which were replaced in 1920. The bridge is closed to both vehicular and pedestrian traffic. At the time of its National Register listing in 1999, it was one of fifteen surviving lenticular truss bridges in the state.

== See also ==
- National Register of Historic Places listings in Windham County, Connecticut
- List of bridges on the National Register of Historic Places in Connecticut
