= Main Street Bridge (Stamford, Connecticut) =

- U.S. National Register of Historic Places
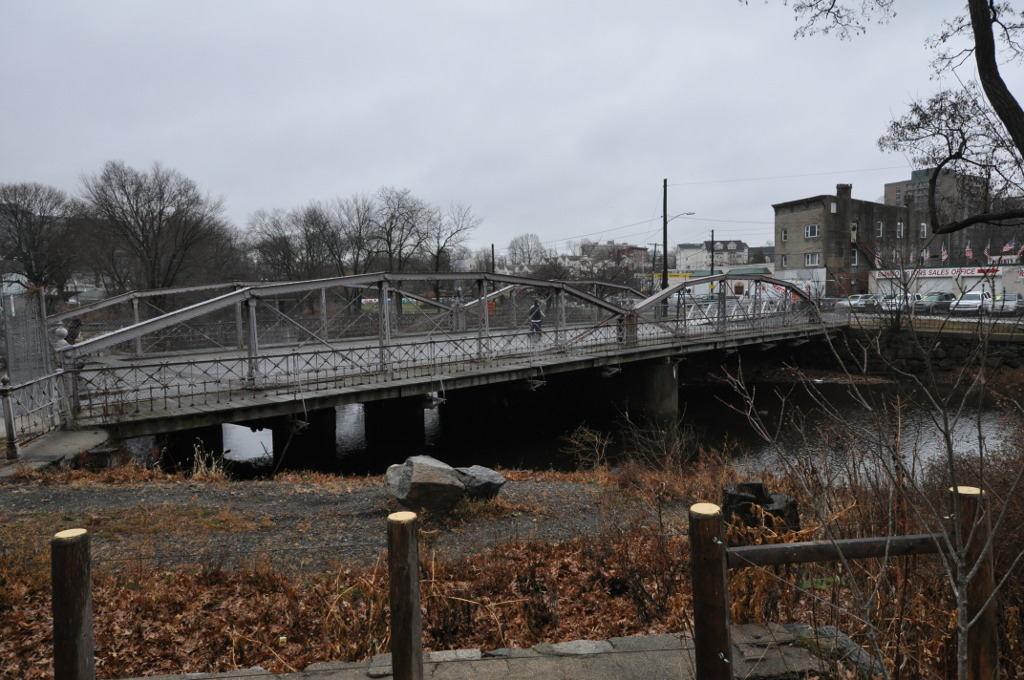

- Location within Connecticut Location within the United States
- Location: Formerly carried Main Street over the Rippowam River, Stamford, Connecticut
- Coordinates: 41°3′14″N 73°32′44″W
- Area: less than one acre
- Built: 1888
- Architect: Berlin Iron Bridge Company
- Architectural style: lenticular pony truss
- NRHP reference No.: 87000801
- Added to NRHP: May 21, 1987

The Main Street Bridge formerly carried Main Street over the Rippowam River (also known as Mill River) just outside downtown Stamford, Connecticut. It was designed and manufactured by the Berlin Iron Bridge Company in 1888. It is a two-span wrought iron lenticular truss bridge, each span 60 feet (18 m) long, although there are supporting piers every 12 feet (3.7 m) feet. The abutments and central pier are cut granite and other stone, faced in concrete.

The bridge was listed on the National Register of Historic Places in 1987, at which time it was the only lenticular truss bridge on a major artery in the state. The bridge is (as of 2014) only open to pedestrian traffic.

== See also ==
- National Register of Historic Places listings in Stamford, Connecticut
- List of bridges on the National Register of Historic Places in Connecticut
