= Rice Farm Road Bridge =

- U.S. National Register of Historic Places
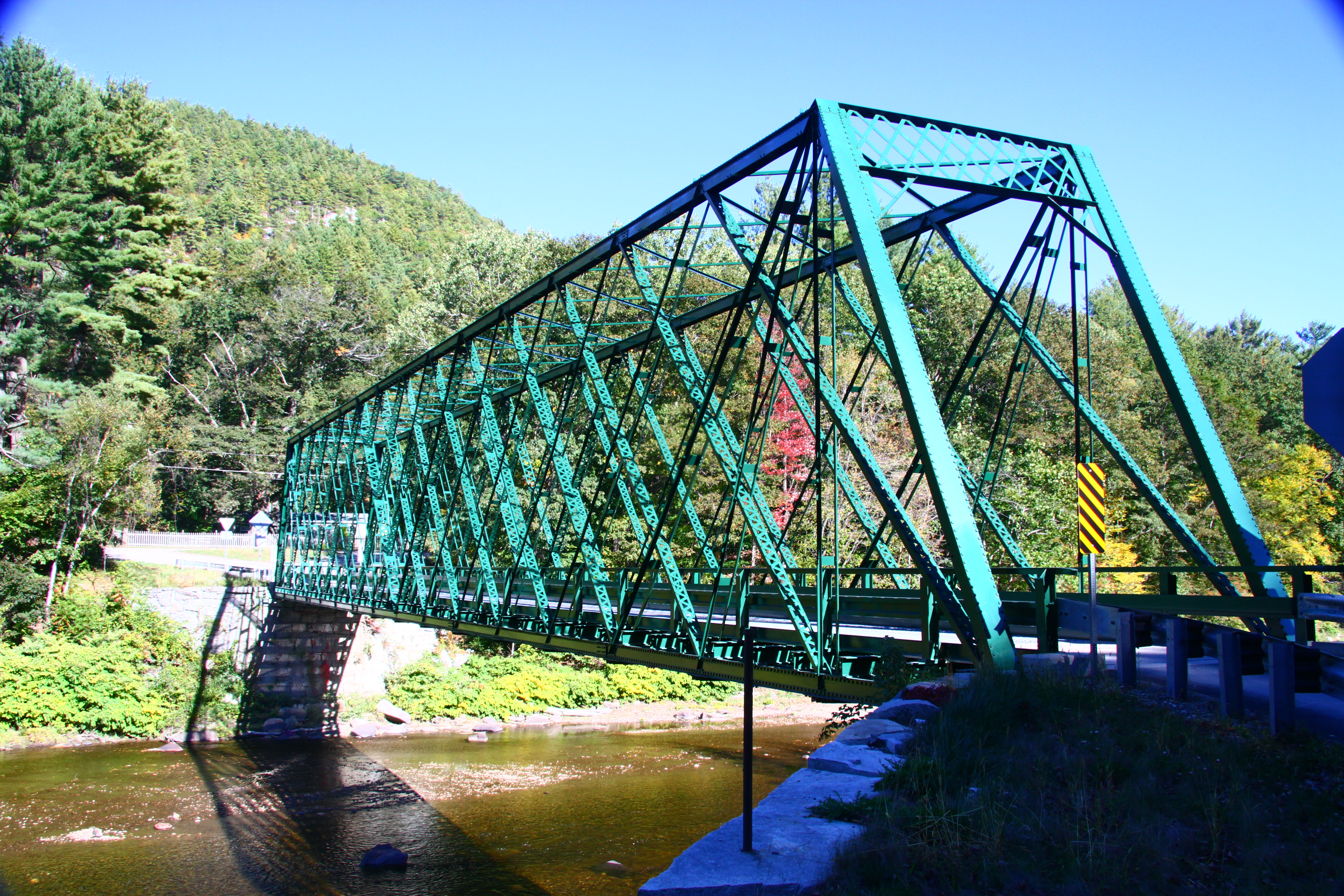

- Location within Vermont Location within the United States
- Location: Town Hwy. 62 (Rice Farm Road), off VT 30, Dummerston, Vermont
- Coordinates: 42°54′58″N 72°36′48″W
- Area: less than one acre
- Built: 1892
- Built by: Berlin Iron Bridge Company
- Architectural style: Warren through truss bridge
- MPS: Metal Truss, Masonry, and Concrete Bridges in Vermont MPS
- NRHP reference No.: 95001259
- Added to NRHP: November 7, 1995

The Rice Farm Road Bridge is a historic bridge in Dummerston, Vermont. It is an iron Warren through truss, spanning the West River between Vermont Route 30 and Rice Farm Road. Built in 1892, it is one of the state's oldest surviving metal truss bridges. It was listed on the National Register of Historic Places in 1995.

== Description and history ==
The Rice Farm Road Bridge is located in a rural area of central Dummerston, a short way north of Stickney Brook Road and south of West Dummerston. Vermont Route 30 in this area is on the west bank of the West River, while Rice Farm Road and Quarry Road are located on its eastern bank. The bridge is oriented east–west and is mounted on rough stone abutments that appear to be scrap material from a nearby granite quarry. The bridge trusses are 198 feet (60 m) long, with a roadway width of 14.2 feet (4.3 m) (one lane), and a portal clearance height of 21.4 feet (6.5 m). The bridge is typically 24 feet (7.3 m) above the river.

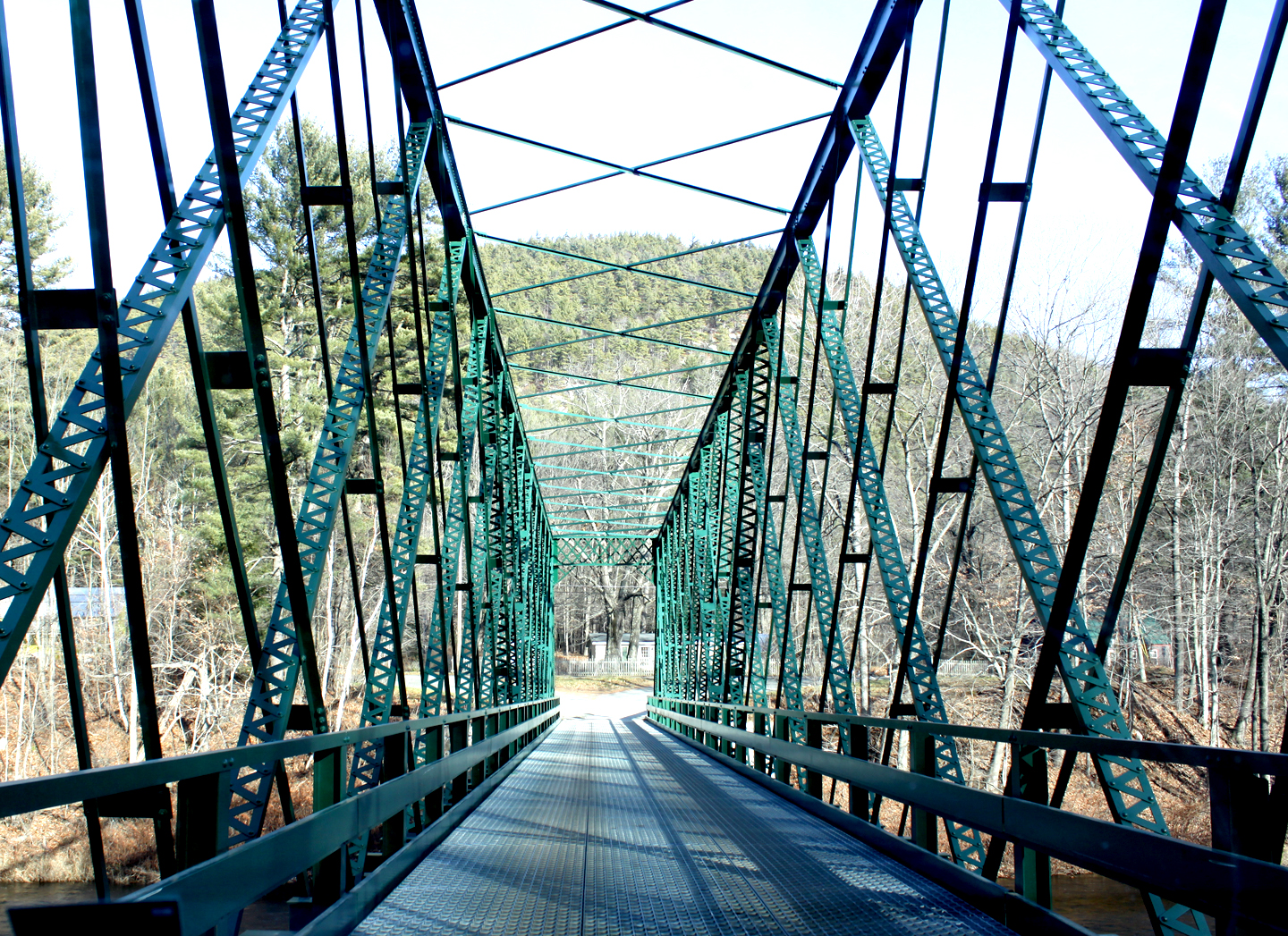
Rice Farm Road Bridge view from the roadway in December 2015

The bridge was built in 1892 by the Berlin Iron Bridge Company, a leading bridge builder in New England of the period. The trusses used in the bridge are a variant of the Warren truss known as the Hilton or quadruple-intersection truss, which is more commonly seen on railroad bridges and was not widely used for roads. The bridge joints are also riveted, rather than the Berlin Company's more typical use of pins. In this case, its ability to carry heavy loads was needed because it was built primarily to service the granite quarry of George E. Lyon, located on the east side of the river. The bridge is also one of the longer ones produced by the company and was highlighted in its catalog.

== See also ==
- National Register of Historic Places listings in Windham County, Vermont
- List of bridges on the National Register of Historic Places in Vermont
