= Douglas & Jarvis Patent Parabolic Truss Iron Bridge =

- U.S. National Register of Historic Places
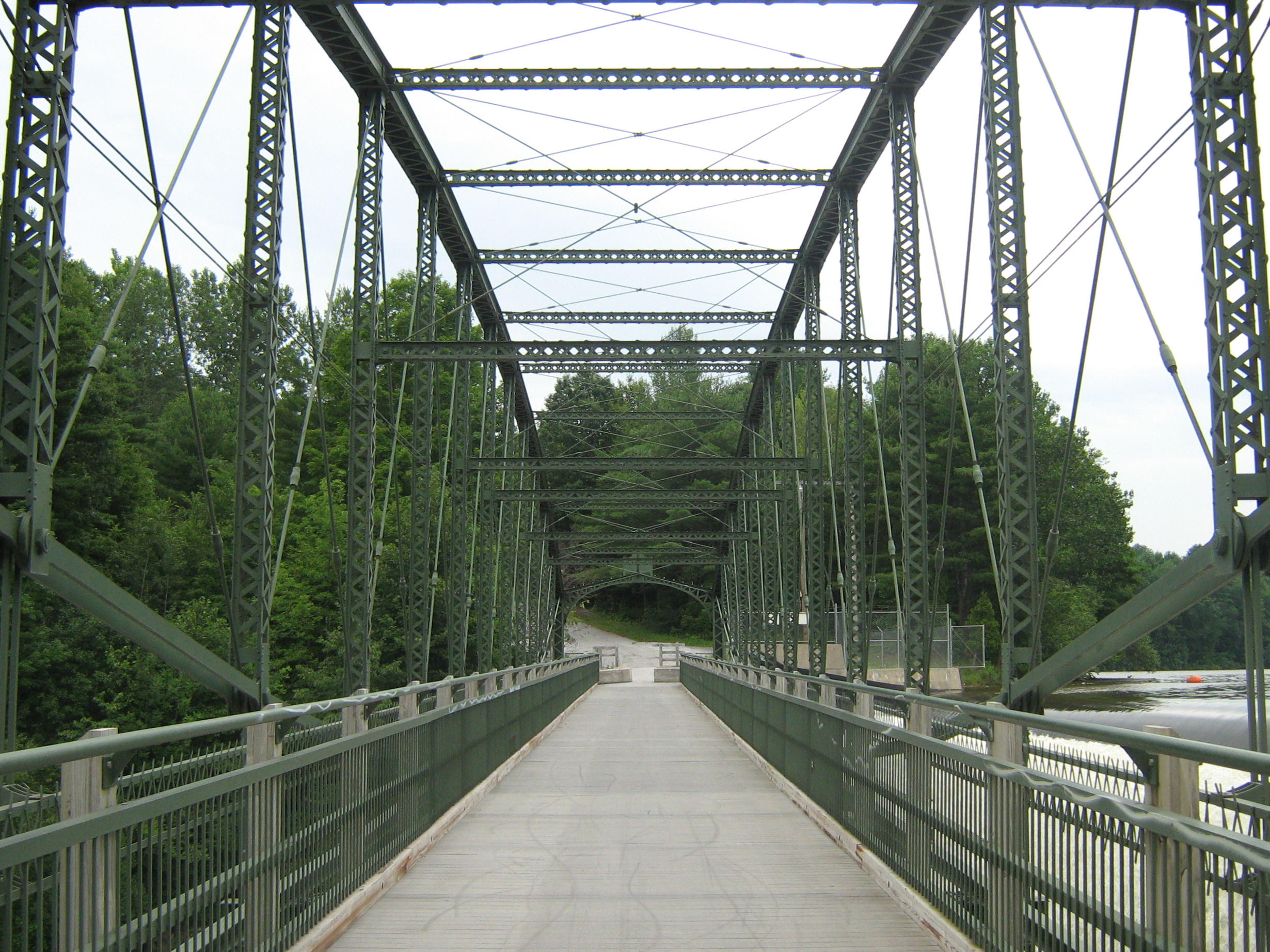

- Location within Vermont
- Location: Mill Hill Rd., Highgate, Vermont
- Coordinates: 44°56′3″N 73°2′53″W
- Area: less than one acre
- Built: 1887
- Built by: The Berlin Iron Bridge Company; Douglas & Jarvis
- Architectural style: Parabolic Truss Iron
- NRHP reference No.: 74000213
- Added to NRHP: March 21, 1974

The Douglas & Jarvis Patent Parabolic Truss Iron Bridge is a historic bridge across the Missisquoi River in Highgate, Vermont. Located at the end of Mill Hill Road, it is at 215 feet (66 m) one of the longest bridges of its type in the northeastern United States. It was built in 1887, and was listed on the National Register of Historic Places in 1974.

== Description and history ==
The Douglas & Jarvis Patent Parabolic Truss Iron Bridge stands south of Highgate Falls village, at the end of Mill Hill Road, where it formerly crossed the Missisquoi River to meet Highgate Road (Vermont Route 207). The bridge is oriented east-west across the river, just downstream (north of) the dam at Highgate Falls, and is open to pedestrian use. It is 215 feet (66 m) long and is set on stone abutments. It is of a parabolic or lenticular truss design, with a secondary lenticular pony truss span at its southern end. The main trusses are supported by iron I-beam portal posts topped by decorative finials, and are joined to each other by a web of overhead iron rods.

The bridge was built in 1887 by the Berlin Iron Bridge Company of Berlin, Connecticut, which held rights to the Douglas and Jarvis patent for the lenticular truss design. The bridge was one of the first to be built in the state with state-assisted local funding, and is one of the largest surviving lenticular truss bridges in the northeastern United States. The company built many instances of this design in the late 19th century, but gradually phased out its use in the early 20th century.

== See also ==
- National Register of Historic Places listings in Franklin County, Vermont
- National Register of Historic Places listings in Vermont
