= South Washington Street Parabolic Bridge =

Bridge over the Susquehanna River in Binghamton, New York

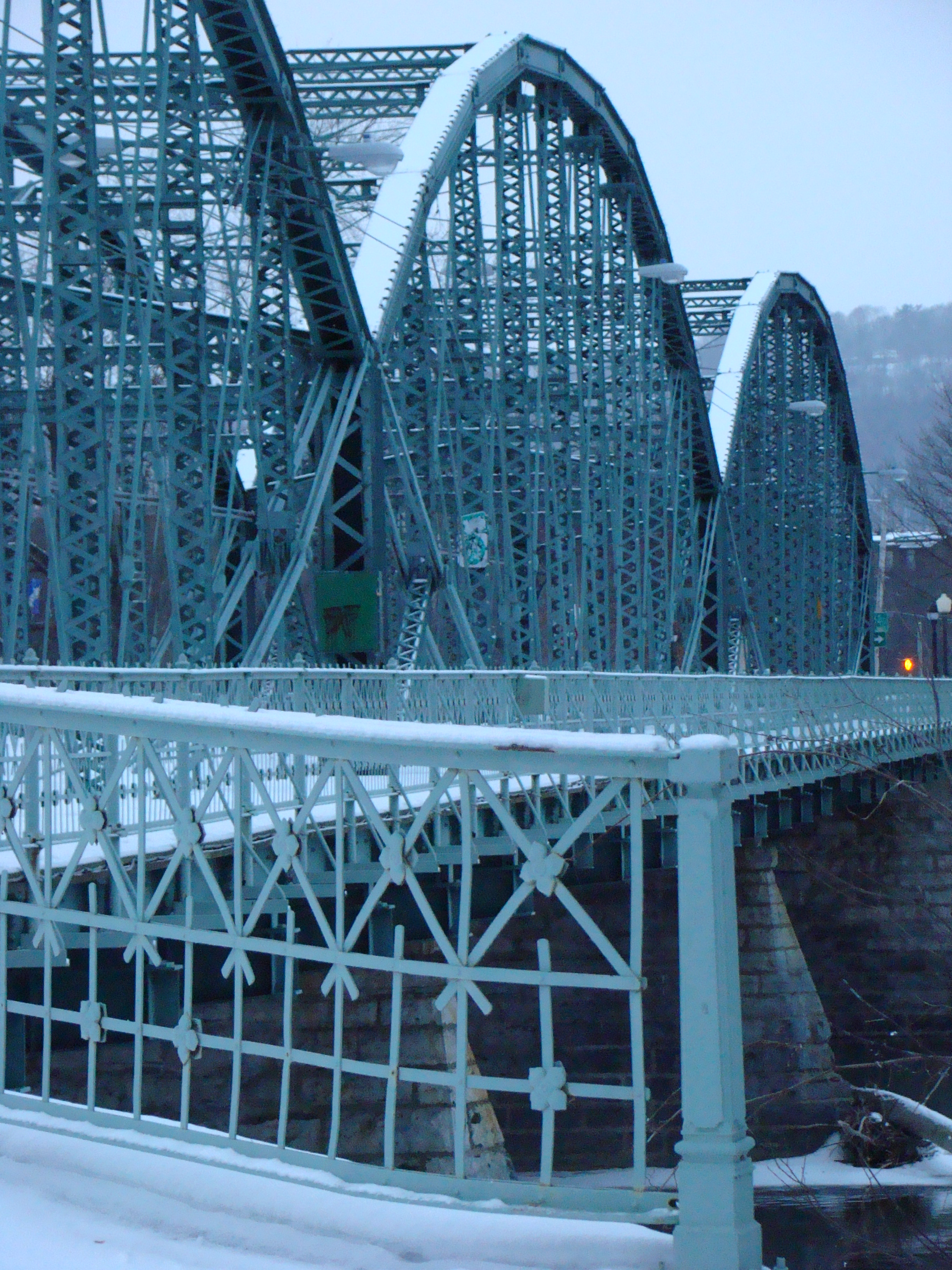
- The bridge in February 2011
- Coordinates: 42°5′33″N 75°54′54″W
- Crosses: Susquehanna River
- Locale: Binghamton, New York

Characteristics
- Design: Lenticular truss
- Total length: 484 feet (148 m)
- No. of spans: 3
- Clearance above: 9.6 feet (2.9 m)

History
- Designer: William O. Douglas
- Constructed by: Berlin Iron Bridge Co.
- Built: 1886–1887
- Construction cost: US$38,000
- Closed: April 23, 1969 (to vehicles)
- South Washington Street Parabolic Bridge
- U.S. National Register of Historic Places
- NRHP reference No.: 78001842
- Added to NRHP: January 30, 1978

Location
- Interactive map of South Washington Street Parabolic Bridge

South Washington Street Parabolic Bridge, originally known as the Washington Street Bridge, is a historic lenticular truss bridge located at Binghamton in Broome County, New York. Designed by William O. Douglas, the bridge was constructed from 1886 to 1887 by the Berlin Iron Bridge Co. and spans the Susquehanna River. The bridge was closed to vehicular traffic in 1969, listed on the National Register of Historic Places in 1978 and designated as a state historic civil engineering landmark in 1980. The crossing is currently used as a pedestrian crossing.

== History ==
The bridge is located near the confluence of the Chenango and Susquehanna rivers at original settlement location of Binghamton, which was known as "Chenango Point". The new structure replaced a covered bridge that had previously crossed the Susquehanna River at the same location.

The structure is composed of three identical through trusses with an overall length of 484 feet (148 m). The bridge has a 24-foot (7.3 m) roadway with 6-foot (1.8 m) walkways on each side. The design of the lenticular (parabolic) truss used in the bridge was patented by William O. Douglas, an engineer and a Civil War veteran from Binghamton. Construction of the bridge began in the fall of 1886. The structure was completed in 1887 at a cost of $38,000. Built by the Berlin Iron Bridge Co., the bridge was the longest multiple span, lenticular truss bridge constructed in New York State during the 19th century.

During the 1950s, there were plans to demolish the bridge, then known as the Washington Street Bridge, after a new bridge was constructed across the river. The six-lane Collier Street Bridge (now called the State Street Bridge) opened on November 19, 1956, but Binghamton residents started a campaign to save the old bridge before the new bridge opened. The Washington Street Bridge was closed to vehicular traffic on April 23, 1969 due to safety concerns related to its structural condition. It has since been used as a pedestrian crossing.

The bridge was listed on the National Register of Historic Places in 1978. It was designated as a New York Historic Civil Engineering Landmark by the American Society of Civil Engineers in 1980. The bridge was rehabilitated in 2016.

== Photos ==
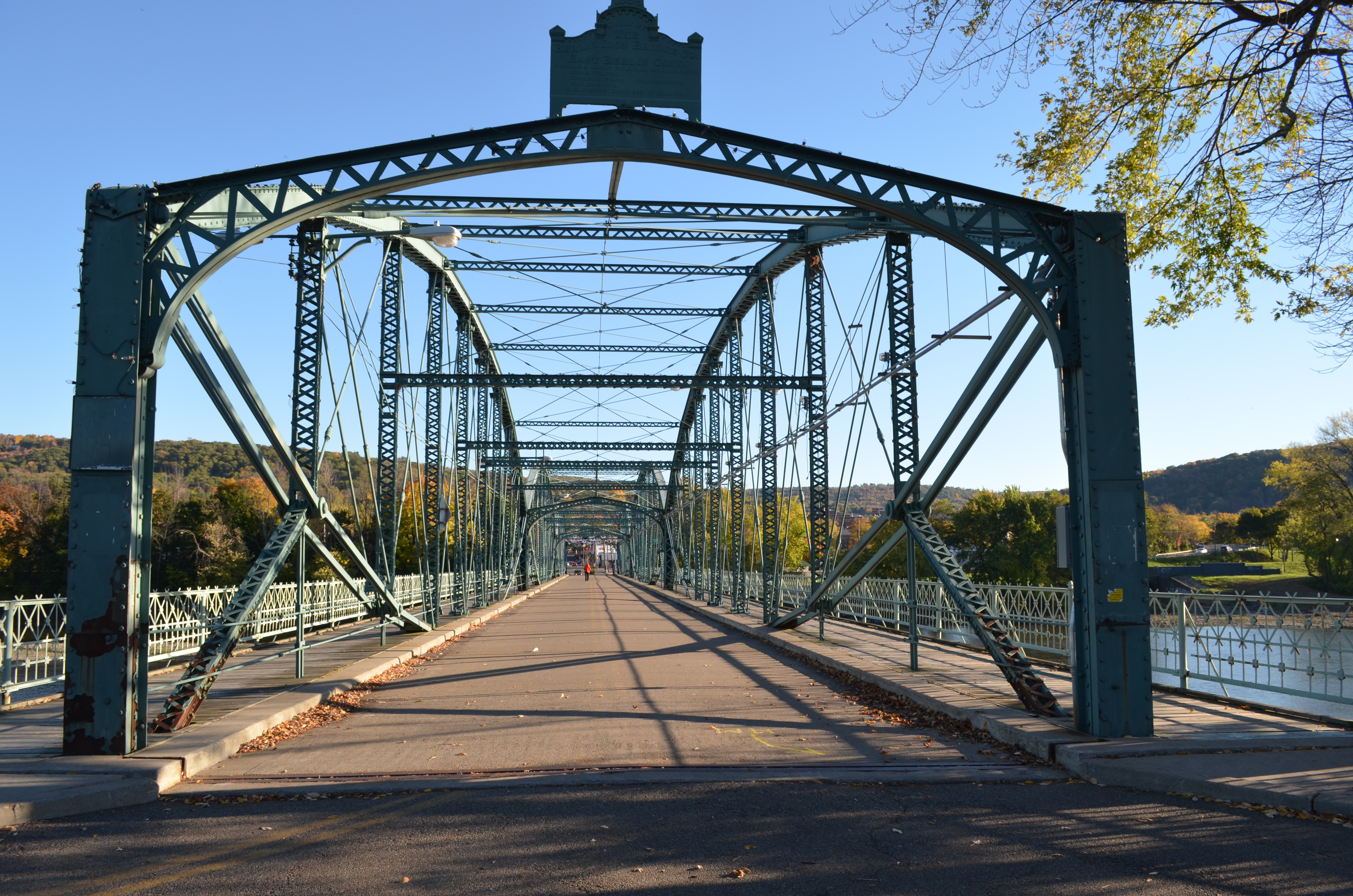
Looking down the Washington Street Bridge.

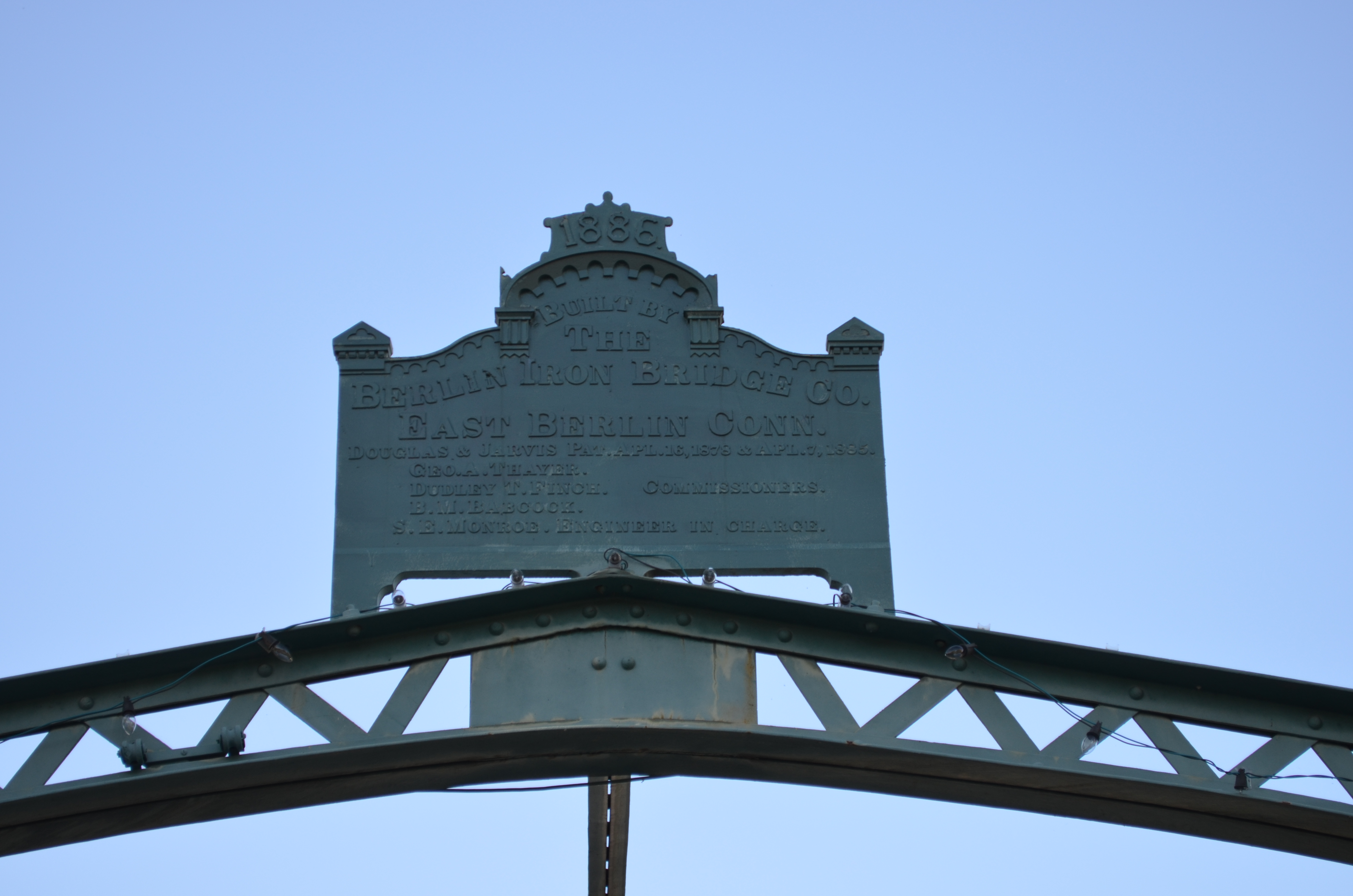
The Berlin Iron Bridge Co. plaque on the top of the bridge.

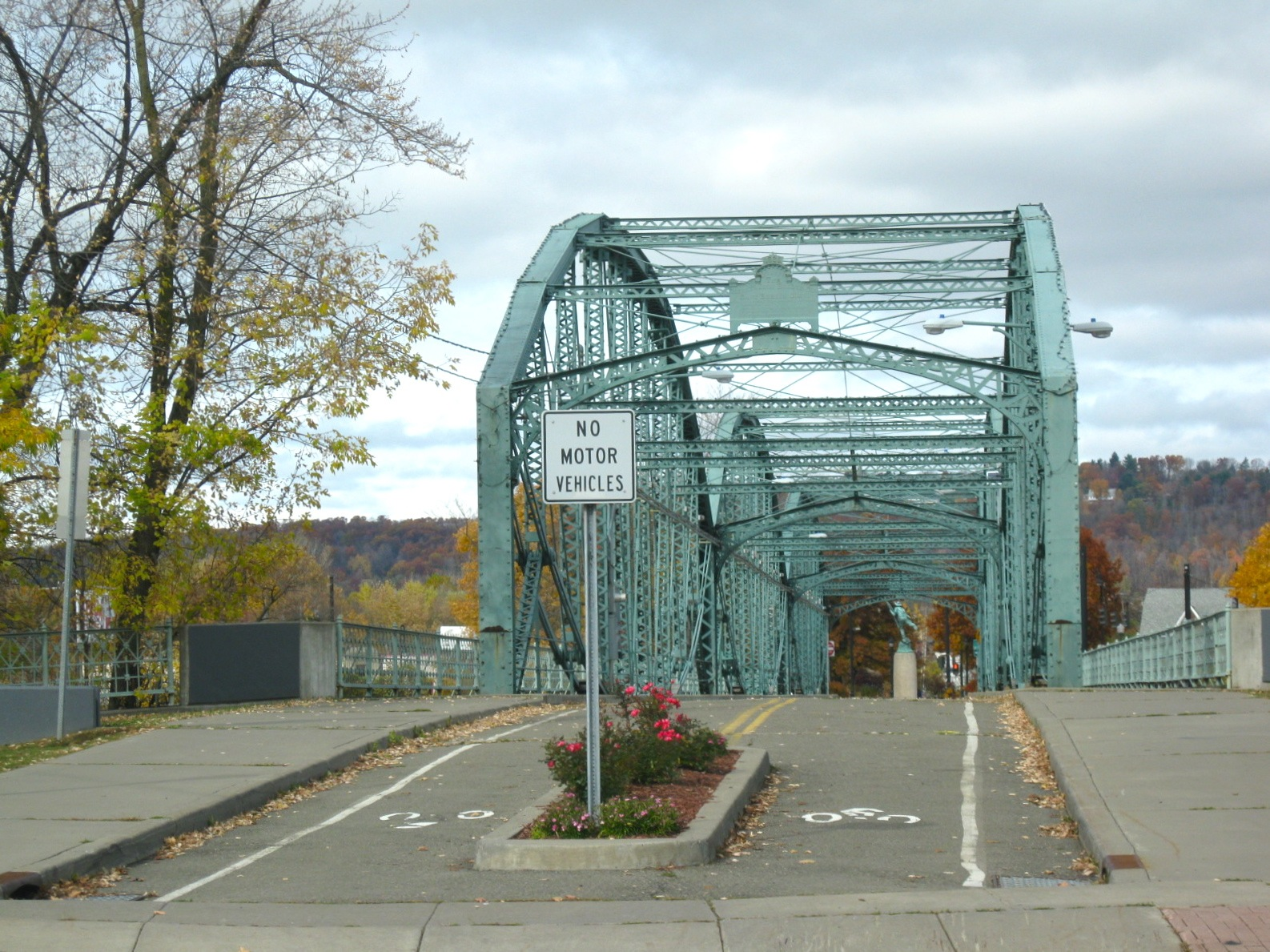
A view of the bridge from the south, from the intersection of Washington Street and Conklin Avenue.

== See also ==
- Ouaquaga Lenticular Truss Bridge, a similar bridge also in Broome County
