= Joseph E. M. Ouellette =

Canadian politician

Member of the Legislative Assembly of New Brunswick
- In office 1970–1974
- Constituency: Victoria

Personal details
- Born: July 23, 1908 Drummond, New Brunswick
- Died: January 15, 1992 (aged 83) Grand Falls, New Brunswick
- Party: Progressive Conservative Party of New Brunswick
- Spouse: Marthe Thériault
- Children: 11
- Occupation: farmer, businessman

Joseph Emile M. Ouellette (July 23, 1908 – January 15, 1992) was a Canadian politician. He served in the Legislative Assembly of New Brunswick from 1970 to 1974 as member of the Progressive Conservative party.
