= Joseph R. Ouellette =

United States Army Medal of Honor recipient

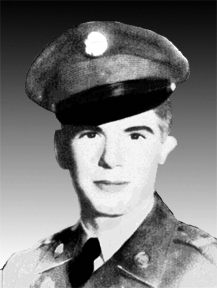
- Medal of Honor recipient
- Born: May 9, 1930; Lowell, Massachusetts
- Died: September 3, 1950 (aged 20) near Yongsan, Korea
- Burial place: Saint Joseph's Cemetery; Chelmsford, Massachusetts
- Military career
- Allegiance: United States of America
- Branch: United States Army
- Rank: Private First Class
- Units: Company H, 9th Infantry Regiment, 2nd Infantry Division
- Conflicts: Korean War: Battle of Pusan Perimeter; Battle of Yongsan †
- Awards: Medal of Honor; Purple Heart

Joseph R. Ouellette (May 9, 1930 – September 3, 1950) was a soldier in the United States Army during the Korean War. He posthumously received the Medal of Honor for his actions on August 31 and September 1–3, 1950.

== Medal of Honor citation ==
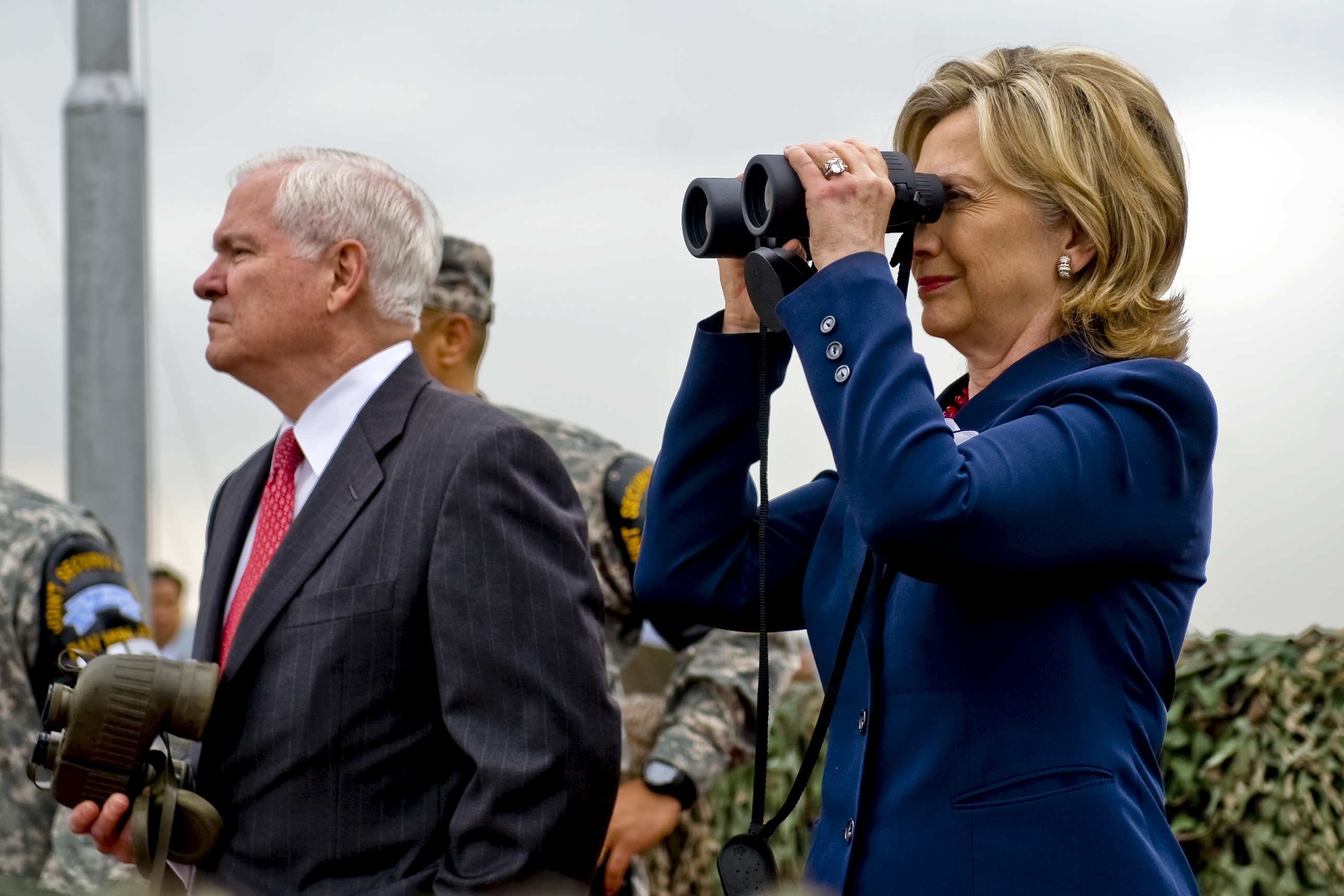
In 2010, Secretary of Defense Robert Gates and Secretary of State Hillary Clinton visited Observation Point Ouellette during a tour from the demilitarized zone in South Korea.

Rank and organization: Private First Class, U.S. Army, Company H, 9th Infantry Regiment, 2nd Infantry Division

Place and date: Near Yongsan, Korea, from August 31, to September 3, 1950.

Entered service at: Lowell, Mass. Birth: Lowell, Mass.

G.O. No.: 25, April 25, 1951.

Citation:

Pfc. Ouellette distinguished himself by conspicuous gallantry and intrepidity in action against the enemy in the Makioug-Chang River salient. When an enemy assault cut off and surrounded his unit he voluntarily made a reconnaissance of a nearby hill under intense enemy fire to locate friendly troop positions and obtain information of the enemy's strength and location. Finding that friendly troops were not on the hill, he worked his way back to his unit under heavy fire. Later, when an airdrop of water was made outside the perimeter, he again braved enemy fire in an attempt to retrieve water for his unit. Finding the dropped cans broken and devoid of water, he returned to his unit. His heroic attempt greatly increased his comrades' morale. When ammunition and grenades ran low, Pfc. Ouellette again slipped out of the perimeter to collect these from the enemy dead. After collecting grenades he was attacked by an enemy soldier. He killed this enemy in hand-to-hand combat, gathered up the ammunition, and returned to his unit. When the enemy attacked on 3 September, they assaulted his position with grenades. On 6 occasions Pfc. Ouellette leaped from his foxhole to escape exploding grenades. In doing so, he had to face enemy small-arms fire. He continued his resistance, despite a severe wound, until he lost his life. The extraordinary heroism and intrepidity displayed by Pfc. Ouellette reflect the highest credit on himself and are in keeping with the esteemed traditions of the military service.

== Legacy ==
Observation Post Ouellette, a U.S. Army outpost near the Joint Security Area in the Korean Demilitarized Zone, is named for him.

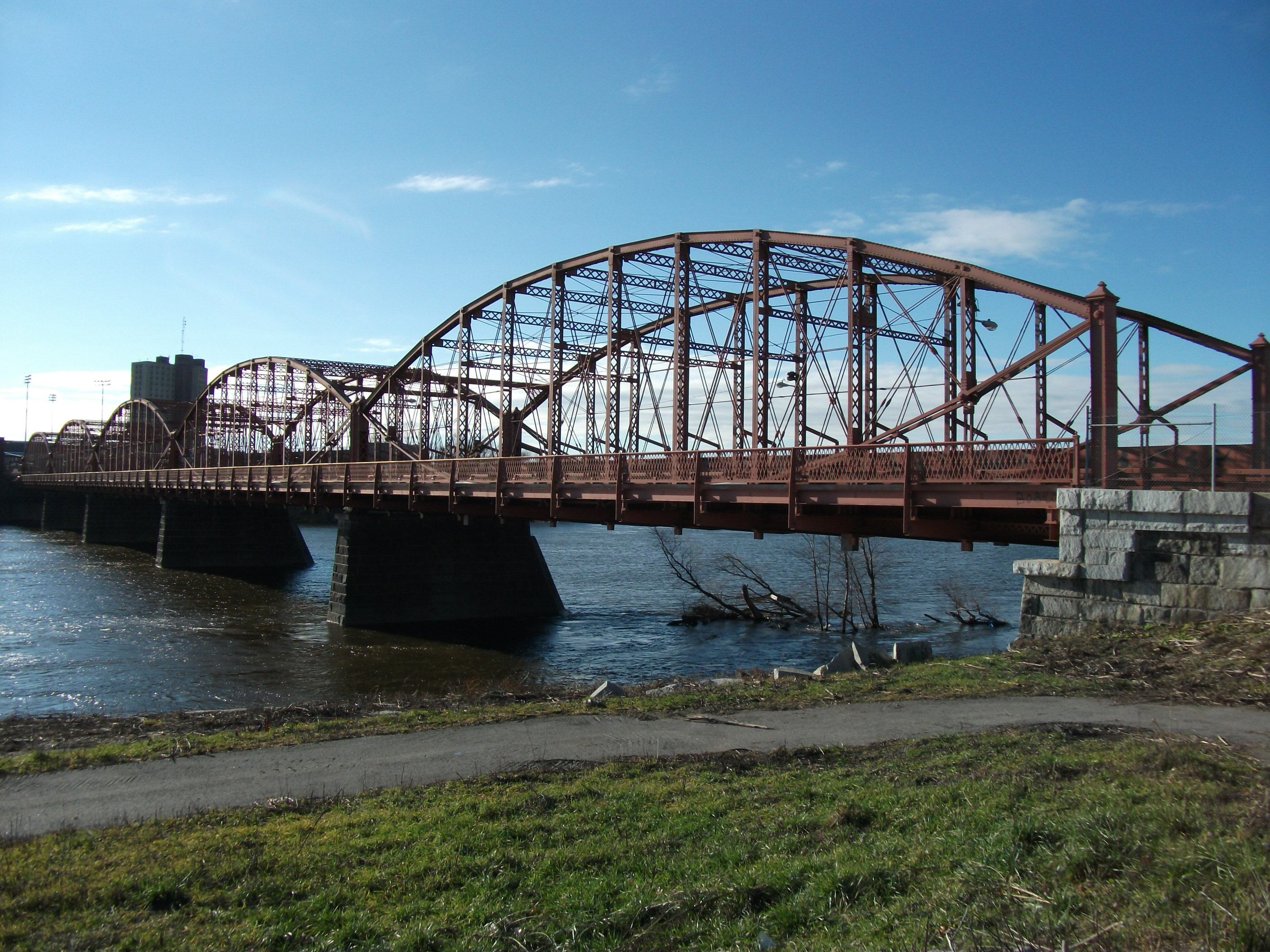
The Ouellette Bridge or Aiken Street Bridge in Lowell, Massachusetts, built in 1883 by the Berlin Iron Bridge Co., is the longest lenticular truss bridge in the country, with 5 spans, as well as the second-oldest lenticular truss bridge in Massachusetts.

A bridge in Ouelette's hometown of Lowell, Massachusetts, is named for him.

== See also ==
- List of Medal of Honor recipients
- List of Korean War Medal of Honor recipients
