= Lovers Leap State Park =

State park in Litchfield County, Connecticut

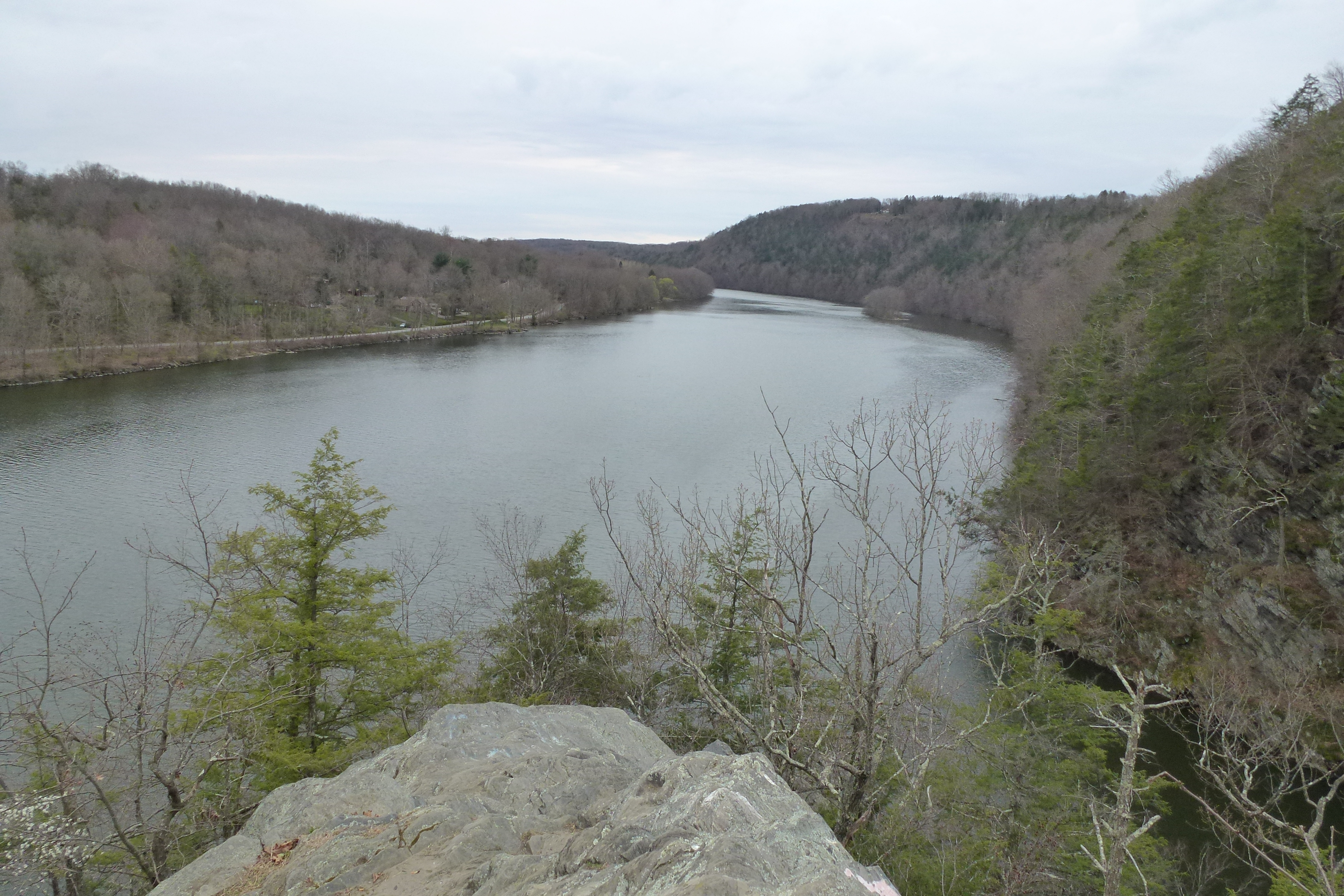
- The Housatonic River as viewed from the leap

- Location within Connecticut Location within the United States
- Location: New Milford, Connecticut, United States
- Coordinates: 41°32′25″N 73°24′18″W
- Area: 160 acres (65 ha)
- Elevation: 194 ft (59 m)
- Established: 1971
- Administrator: Connecticut Department of Energy and Environmental Protection
- Designation: Connecticut state park
- Named for: The Lovers Leap cliff overlooking the Housatonic River
- Website: Official website

Lovers Leap State Park is a public recreation area on the Housatonic River in the town of New Milford, Litchfield County, Connecticut. The state park's 160 acres (65 ha) straddle the Housatonic Gorge near the intersection of Connecticut Route 67 and Connecticut Route 202. The park offers hiking to scenic and historic locations and is managed by the Connecticut Department of Energy and Environmental Protection.

== History ==
The park's eastern 52 acres were once the estate of Catherine Judson Hurd, who bequeathed the land to the state for use a public park in 1971. After Connecticut Light and Power sold land on the west side of the gorge to the state, Lovers Leap State Park was dedicated in 2007.

== Features ==
The park's historic features include the 1895 Berlin Iron Bridge, which is listed on the National Register of Historic Places, the ruins of the Bridgeport Wood Finishing Company factory, and the remains of the Hurd estate which include the vine-encrusted "yellow cat tea house."
