= Lover's Leap Bridge =

United States Historic Place

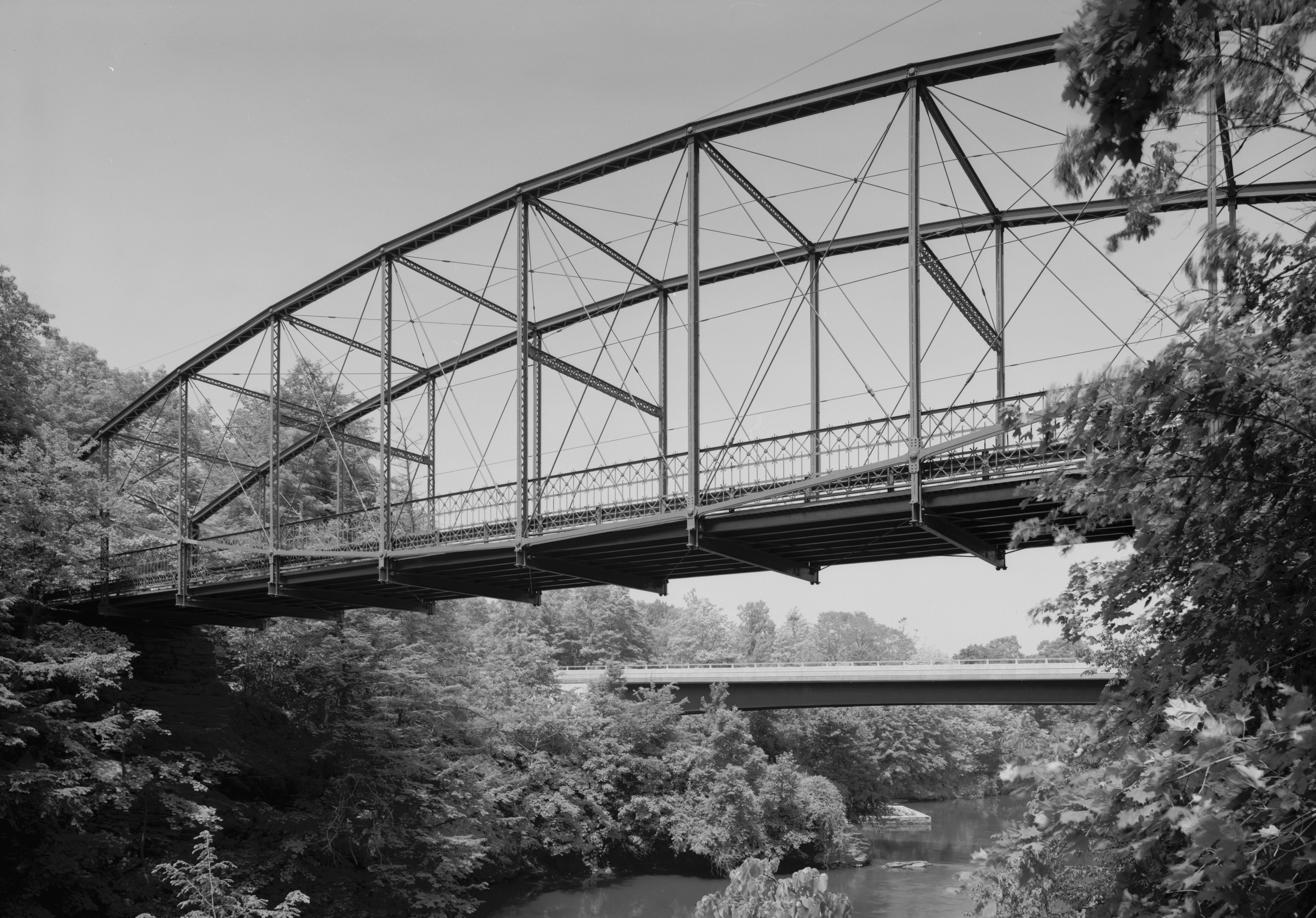
- Lover's Leap Lenticular Bridge
- Coordinates: 41°32′39″N 73°24′25″W
- Carries: Pedestrians
- Crosses: Housatonic River
- Locale: Lovers Leap State Park, New Milford, Connecticut
- Maintained by: Connecticut Department of Environmental Protection

Characteristics
- Design: Lenticular through truss
- Total length: 173 feet (53 m)

History
- Opened: 1895

Statistics
- Toll: None
- Lover's Leap Bridge
- U.S. National Register of Historic Places
- Location within Connecticut Location within the United States
- Location: New Milford, Connecticut
- Area: 1 acre (0.4 ha)
- Built: 1895
- Architect: Berlin Iron Bridge Co.; Douglas & Jarvis
- NRHP reference No.: 76001982
- Added to NRHP: May 13, 1976

Location
- Interactive map of Lover's Leap Bridge

The Lover's Leap Bridge is a wrought-iron lenticular truss bridge over the Housatonic River located in Lovers Leap State Park in New Milford, Connecticut. Built in 1895 by the Berlin Iron Bridge Company, it is one of the last bridges built by the company and is a particularly ornate example of its work. It was listed on the National Register of Historic Places in 1976 and is now open only for foot traffic.

== Description and history ==
The Lover's Leap Bridge is located south of downtown New Milford, in the northern part of Lovers Leap State Park. It spans the Housatonic River a short way downstream of its confluence with the Still River, and just south of a bridge carrying Still River Drive. It is accessible on foot from parking areas near either end, along the former alignment of Pumpkin Hill Road, which it originally carried. It is a single-span wrought-iron lenticular truss, 173 feet (53 m) in length, resting on coursed stone abutments. Its truss elements are joined by pins. The posts at the ends are topped by urn finials, and the crossing latticework elements at the portal ends are arched and crowned by cresting. Crossing elements of the guard rails are decorated with rosettes.

The bridge was built in 1895 by the Berlin Iron Bridge Company. This was one of the last bridges manufactured by the company out of iron, which had mostly been supplanted by steel as a preferred bridge building material by that time. The bridge was used by both vehicles and pedestrians until 1977, and was closed to vehicular traffic after the crossing just north of the bridge was constructed.

== See also ==
- National Register of Historic Places listings in Litchfield County, Connecticut
- List of bridges documented by the Historic American Engineering Record in Connecticut
- List of bridges on the National Register of Historic Places in Connecticut
