= Colchester (disambiguation) =

Colchester is a city in Essex, England.

Colchester may also refer to:

== United Kingdom ==
- Colchester (UK Parliament constituency)
- City of Colchester, a district of Essex created in 1974
  - Municipal Borough of Colchester, a district of Essex from 1835 to 1974
- Baron Colchester, former Peerage title
- Viscount Colchester, former Peerage title
- Colchester Green, Suffolk

== United States ==
- Colchester, Connecticut
  - Colchester (CDP), Connecticut, central borough
  - Colchester Village Historic District
- Colchester, Illinois
- Colchester, New York
- Colchester, Vermont
- Colchester, Virginia
- Colchester Township, McDonough County, Illinois

== Canada ==
- Colchester County, Nova Scotia
- Colchester, Ontario
- Colchester (federal electoral district)
- Colchester (provincial electoral district)

== South Africa ==
- Colchester, Eastern Cape

== Other ==
- Colchester Rubber Co., a footwear brand
- The "Colchester" was a 1160 grt ship, part of the Great Eastern Railway Fleet
- Colchester bays, a type of cloth similar to Berge.
