= Hat and Fragrance Textile Gallery =

Coordinates: 44°22′40.65″N 73°13′45.66″W

The Hat and Fragrance Textile Gallery is an exhibit space at Shelburne Museum in Shelburne, Vermont which houses quilts, hatboxes, and various other textiles. The name "Hat and Fragrance" refers both to Electra Havemeyer Webb's collection of hatboxes and to the fragrant, herbal sachets used to preserve textiles. In 1954, Shelburne Museum was the first museum to exhibit quilts as works of art; prior to this exhibition quilts were only shown as accessories in historic houses.

== History ==
Captain Benjamin Harrington built this structure about 1800 in Shelburne, Vermont. Harrington, who owned and operated a nearby inn, used the building as a distillery to produce spirits to serve at his inn. The building later served as the Shelburne town barn but, after a period of disuse, the town gave the building to the Shelburne Museum in 1947 when the museum moved it to its present site.

Constructed of hand-hewn timbers and rough planks, the building was used as a storage and workshop space for several years while the museum decided how to renovate it as a textile gallery. Adopting the name "Hat and Fragrance", which refers to the museum's collection of hatboxes and herbal sachets used to preserve early textiles, the museum paneled the interior walls with maple, birch, and beech veneers in decorative patterns. The original structure still maintains this decorative paneling. The museum later built four additional rooms to provide further exhibition space.

== Collection ==
=== Hatboxes and bandboxes ===
Hatboxes and their smaller relation the bandbox were made of thin sheets of bent wood or pasteboard and covered with decorative printed papers. Serving as an inexpensive form of luggage for men and women, the boxes carried and stored hats, collars, cuffs, and other finery. Their use increased in the 19th century as new roads, steamboats, and steam locomotives encouraged more people to travel.

Shelburne Museum's collection of over two hundred hatboxes and bandboxes is one of the largest and most comprehensive on public display in the country. The collection represents the wide variety of box sizes and forms, paper colors, and designs and is particularly rich in rare, early papers.

Most hat-and-bandbox factories were located in larger cities such as New York, Boston, Philadelphia, or Hartford. However, many individuals operated small companies to make and sell hatboxes to local markets. One of the best known of these craftspeople was Hannah Davis (1784–1863) of Jaffrey, New Hampshire, whose work is well represented in the museum's collection.

Early boxes were covered with printed and handpainted paper imported from England and Europe. Wallpaper from American printers became available in the 19th century and was quickly adopted by hat and bandbox makers.

Patterns and colors for the papers were influenced by current decorating styles. The images of classical architecture, griffins, and chariots pulled by birds were inspired by the mid-19th century interest in Greek and Roman history. Common and exotic creatures such as cows, beavers, anacondas, and giraffes were inspired by zoos, traveling animal exhibitions, illustrated bestiaries, and geography books. Finally, hatbox makers often copied illustrations of American city and rural scenes, historic landmarks, new modes of transportation, or important people and events published in popular books and magazines. Popular paper designs include the New York City Deaf and Dumb Asylum, a duck hunt, a sidewheel steamboat, President Harrison's log cabin and a balloon ascension.

=== Quilts and bedcoverings ===
Embroidered bed-rugs and blankets, coverlets, and quilts were a critical necessity in poorly heated early American homes. The making of bedcovers provided women with an important creative outlet and often served as the primary source of decoration in sparsely furnished 17th- and 18th-century homes. As America's economy grew in the 19th century, the increase in leisure time and the availability of inexpensive factory-woven cloth encouraged thousands of women to embroider, sew, and quilt bedcovers for their families and friends.

Shelburne Museum was one of the first institutions to collect and exhibit American textiles which possess bold graphic patterns, clarity of line, intense colors, and the imaginative combinations of human figures, animals and vegetation which is often whimsical and out of scale.

The still-growing collection at the museum is remarkable in its size and quality. Over seven hundred quilts, coverlets, blankets, and bed-rugs from the 18th and 19th century illustrate the different types of bedcovers, the diversity of designs and fabrics, and the many methods of manufacture used by creative men and women. Although the collection predominantly represents New England and the northern states, it also includes examples from the southern and mid-western regions, as well as from such distinctive groups as the Amish, Pennsylvania Dutch, and native Hawaiians.

Bed-rugs, a traditional northern European bedcover, were brought to America from northern England and widely used until the early 19th century. Now quite rare, these thick, heavy bedcovers were embroidered with handspun and dyed yarns on wool fabric to create a dense pile surface similar to that of an Oriental rug.

Hand-woven blankets, treasured for their warmth and durability, often were embroidered with colorful handspun wool yarns. Women embroidered swirling vine, floral and shell patterns on plain blankets and filled squares of window-pane-checked blankets with stars and flowers.

Single and double coverlets, hand-woven in bold, geometric patterns from the mid-eighteenth to mid-19th centuries, were considered more decorative than plain or plaid blankets. While most were woven in blue and white, some weavers chose to emphasize the patterns by combining two or more colors. Jacquard coverlets, introduced in the early 19th century, became immediately popular because of their elaborate floral, mosaic, figural, and patriotic patterns. Professional weavers advertised them as fancy coverlets to differentiate them from hand-woven coverlets with geometric patterns.

Quilts are made by joining layers of cloth – usually a decorative top, warm filling of either raw wool or cotton, and plain backing – and sewing or "quilting" them together. The method by which the quilt top is made, pieced, appliquéd, or plain, determines the nature of the design.

The first quilts made in America followed English and European traditions. Early plain whole-cloth quilts were made from lengths of imported, highly glazed, richly colored wool fabric. The stitches used to secure the layers followed decorative swirling vine and floral patterns similar to those used in embroidery or in painted decorations on furniture and walls.

The earliest pieced quilts were made by sewing or "piecing" small geometric pieces of fabric together in simple honeycomb or triangle patterns. As American women perfected the art of quilt making in the early 19th century, they developed more complex patterns often requiring hundreds of thousands of tiny pieces. Geometric star, flower, and figural patterns were pieced together in small blocks and then sewn together to make a quilt top.

The first American appliquéd quilts, made in the 18th century, used the broderie perse, French for Persian embroidery, technique of cutting entire motifs from imported printed fabric, then sewing them on a plain fabric background. 19th-century quilters continued this tradition adding their own twists, following patterns printed in ladies' magazines, copied from a friend, or designed on their own.

Occasionally women also stenciled, painted and embroidered fabrics to imitate elaborate quilt or coverlet patterns. Other bedcovers were knitted or crocheted in elegant patterns.

== See also ==
- History of quilting
