= Hayward House (Colchester, Connecticut) =

Historic house in Connecticut, United States

- U.S. National Register of Historic Places
- U.S. Historic district – Contributing property
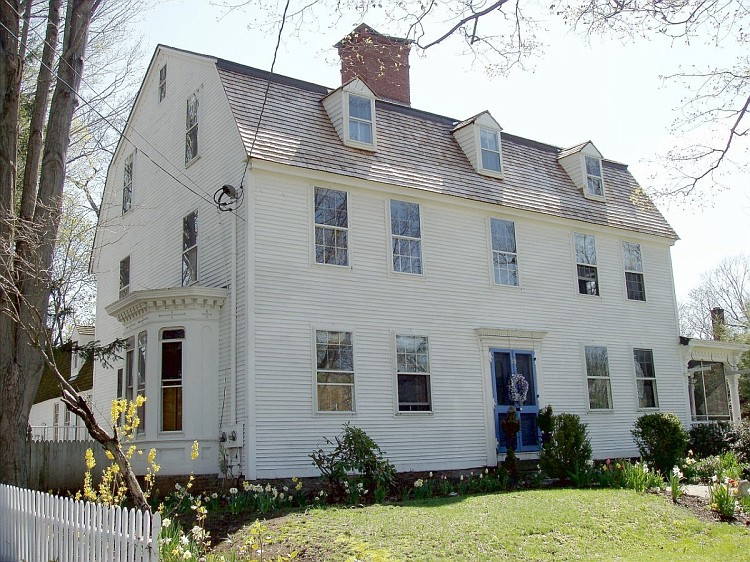
- Hayward House in 2006

- Location within Connecticut Location within the United States
- Location: 9 Hayward Avenue, Colchester, Connecticut
- Coordinates: 41°34′29″N 72°19′53″W
- Area: 1 acre (0.40 ha)
- Built: 1775
- Architect: Otis, Amos
- Architectural style: Georgian
- Part of: Colchester Village Historic District (ID94000254)
- NRHP reference No.: 72001325

Significant dates
- Added to NRHP: October 18, 1972
- Designated CP: April 4, 1994

The Hayward House is a historic house at 9 Hayward Avenue in Colchester, Connecticut. Built in 1775 and embellished in the late 19th century, it is a well-preserved 18th-century house, which has seen a number of locally prominent residents, as well as the nationally known inventor Nathaniel Hayward, who developed the process of vulcanizing rubber. The house was listed on the National Register of Historic Places in 1972.

== Description and history ==
The Hayward House is located on the north side of Colchester's central village green, on the north side of Hayward Avenue. It is a three-story wood-frame structure, with a gambrel roof, a large central chimney, and a single-story porch extending across the front. The roof is pierced by three gabled dormers. The main facade is five bays wide, with a center entrance framed by pilasters and a corniced entablature. A series of ells extend to the rear. On the left side a single-story polygonal bay projects, and a single-story screened porch extends across the right. During the late 19th-century, a Victorian porch was built across the front; this has since been removed.

The house was built about 1775, by Abel Amos, a local builder, for Dudley Wright. At the time of its construction, it was one of largest and most elegant homes in the village. Wright operated a tavern on the premises, and also hosted meetings of the local Masonic lodge, which were held in a large ballroom that extends across the rear of the second floor. Dudley Wright's daughter married Doctor John Watrous, a figure locally prominent not just as a physician, but also for his civic involvement and philanthropy. In 1842, the house was purchased by the 19th-century inventor Nathaniel Hayward, the founder and principal owner of the Hayward Rubber Company.

== See also ==
- National Register of Historic Places listings in New London County, Connecticut
