= Colchester Rubber Co. =

American footwear brand

Colchester Rubber Co. was a footwear brand manufactured by the Colchester Rubber Company.

Original Colchester Rubber Company ball logo

== History ==
Colchester Rubber Co. was a footwear brand manufactured by the Colchester Rubber Company. The original Colchester Rubber Company, founded in 1888 at Colchester, Connecticut, US.

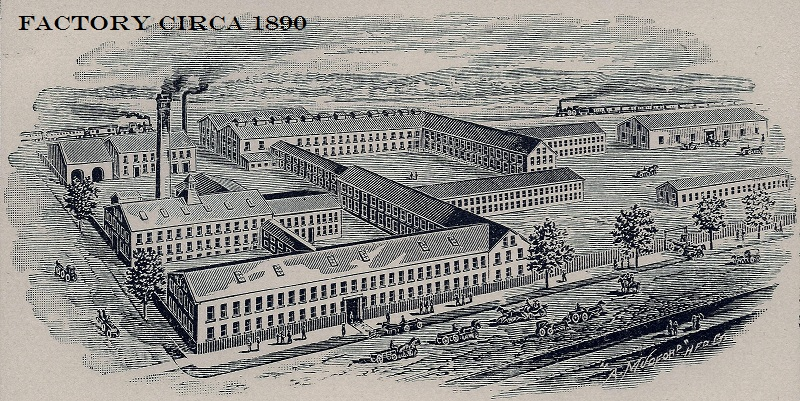
Colchester Rubber Company Factory c. 1890

=== Factory ===
The Colchester Rubber Company factory was located at the intersection of Lebanon Avenue and Mill Street in the factory buildings which previously belonged to the Hayward Rubber Company which was in operation from 1847 to 1885. The Hayward Rubber Company was founded by Nathaniel Hayward, whose findings on the treatment of rubber with sulfur were used to develop vulcanised rubber. Some of the original Colchester Rubber Company factory ruins can still be seen at the site today. Many of the workers in the factory originally came from Ireland.

=== Founding owners ===
The Colchester Rubber Company was founded by George Watkinson who was born 1838. Prior to founding Colchester Rubber Company, George Watkinson was a manager at the Candee Rubber Company.

The Colchester Rubber Company factory, or Rubber Works, at Colchester were co-managed by George Watkinson and his son Irving Watkinson. Irving Watkinson was a busy man, as he also kept the Colchester town weather station and was the proverbial man about town raising show dogs and horses while selling bicycles for the Columbia Brand and being the Captain of the town's baseball team.

=== Products ===
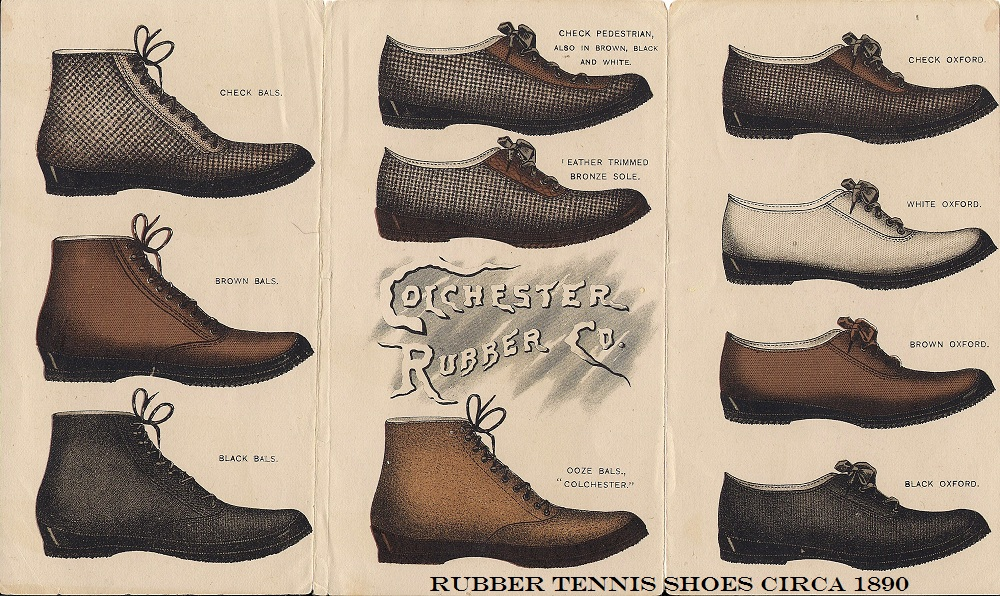
Colchester Rubber Company catalogue pages from around 1890

The Colchester Rubber Company manufactured high end rubber footwear for men, women and children. Their speciality products were working boots for cold and wet weather, rain boots and galoshes. To complement these products, during the short summer season of April to July, they also made and sold canvas and rubber shoes under the classification of "Tennis" shoes. The somewhat misleadingly named "Tennis" shoe range included shoes for walking, baseball, bicycle, tennis and yachting.

The Colchester Rubber Company's products were rated high end quality and considered by some as #1 in their field. The "Tennis" shoes were the promenade shoe of choice at Newport, Rhode Island during the Gilded Age. The products were also exported worldwide and during the late 1880s and early 1890s were seen on the beaches and board-walks in Europe's many resorts.

In 1892 Colchester Rubber Company displayed their footwear at the Chicago World's Fair and Exposition.

=== Company takeover ===
During 1892, Colchester Rubber Company was acquired by The United States Rubber Company as part of their intention to form a monopoly and control the rubber industry in the United by buying a majority of the rubber companies which were in operation at that time.

=== Factory closure ===
During the 1893 Depression, the decision was made by The United States Rubber Company to close the factory in Colchester and discontinue the Colchester Rubber Co. brand.

This decision was, in part, based on the fact that the town of Colchester was located on what was considered a poor water source for manufacturing and was far from seaports and land transportation hubs. The decision to close the factory was kept secret from the employees and the people of the town of Colchester. George Watkinson was promoted to a Vice President position with The United States Rubber Company in the spring of 1893 and left the town of Colchester on a guise of going on vacation. He was replaced in Colchester by Joseph Banigan who oversaw the last of the production from the factory in Colchester as well as the factory closure. During the Christmas holiday in 1893 the factory employees and the people of the town of Colchester were told that the company was going to re-tool the factory and it would be opened after New Year. Instead of this happening, all the machinery was removed from the factory in Colchester and shipped to The United States Rubber Company's holdings at Providence, Rhode Island. A Colchester Advocate newspaper article in early 1894, editorialized, asked when was the factory was going to re-open. When it became clear that the factory was going to stay closed, the town collapsed half of the population leaving and a majority of the businesses in the town subsequently closing.

In around 1895, George Watkinson left The United States Rubber Company and opened The Watkinson Rubber Company at Philadelphia, Pennsylvania which, for a period of time was allowed to compete with The United States Rubber Company. The Watkinson Rubber Company factory remained open until around 1903 and was subsequently acquired by U.S. Rubber. George Watkinson is believed to have died around that time. Records show that Irving Watkinson stayed in the area, with him living in Norwich, Connecticut, in the 1920s

=== 20th century ===
During the 20th century, The United States Rubber Company used the Colchester Rubber Company's logo to co-brand seconds products, destroying the original brand by over-stamping. This type of branding was done by United States Rubber Company and was not related in any way to the original Colchester Rubber Co. brand products of the 1800s.

As of October 2010 a pair of co-branded seconds, bearing both Keds and Colchester Rubber Co. logos, were on display at the Basketball Hall of Fame at Springfield, Massachusetts.

== Influence ==
The Colchester Rubber Co. brand is also the predecessor of the footwear brands Keds, created in 1916, and Pro-Keds, created in 1949 by the United States Rubber Company which acquired the Colchester Rubber Company in 1892.
