= Epaphroditus Champion =

American politician and military officer (1756–1834)

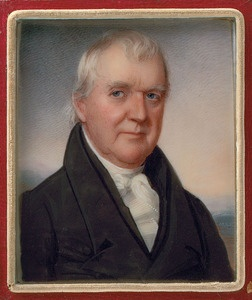
- Portrait of Champion by Anson Dickinson

Member of the U.S. House of Representatives from Connecticut's at-large district
- In office March 4, 1807 – March 3, 1817
- Preceded by: Theodore Dwight
- Succeeded by: Ebenezer Huntington

Member of the Connecticut General Assembly
- In office 1791-1806

Personal details
- Born: April 6, 1756 Colchester, Connecticut Colony, British America
- Died: December 22, 1834 (aged 78) East Haddam, Connecticut, U.S.
- Party: Federalist
- Spouse: Lucretia Hubbard (m. 1781)
- Relations: Henry Champion (brother)
- Children: 3
- Parent(s): Colonel Henry Champion; Deborah Brainard Champion
- Occupation: War Veteran, Politician, Landowner

Epaphroditus Champion Sr. (April 6, 1756 – December 22, 1834) was an American military officer and politician who lived in Connecticut. He served in the Connecticut Assembly and as a U.S. representative from Connecticut.

== Early life ==
Champion was born in Colchester in the Connecticut Colony, son of Colonel Henry Champion and Deborah (Brainard) Champion. He was educated both by private tutors and in the common schools.

One of Champion's brothers, Henry Champion, was a major in the Continental Army during the Revolutionary War and served in the Connecticut state house of representatives.

== Career ==
Coat of Arms of Epaphroditus Champion

During the American Revolutionary War, Connecticut Governor Jonathan Trumbull directed Champion's father, Connecticut state commissary Colonel Henry Champion, to collect cattle and drive them to Valley Forge. Champion helped his father gather a herd of 300 cattle at Hartford, Connecticut and drive them west to King's Ferry, across the Hudson, into New Jersey, across the Delaware to Washington's famished troops west of the Schuylkill. They were devoured in five days prompting Champion to remark that the cattle were so thoroughly eaten that "you might have made a knife out of every bone." Champion was named assistant commissary to Trumbull in 1776, and was the first Commissary General of the Continental Army.

Champion moved to East Haddam, Connecticut in 1782. He served as a captain in the Twenty-fourth Regiment of the Connecticut State militia from 1784 to 1792, as major from 1793 to 1794, as lieutenant colonel from 1795 to 1798, and as brigadier general of the Seventh Brigade from 1800 to 1803.

He worked as a merchant, shipowner, exporter and importer. He was successful in conducting trade in the West Indies. Champion was a member of the Connecticut state assembly from 1791 to 1806. He was elected as a Federalist candidate to the Tenth United States Congress and to the four succeeding Congresses, serving from March 4, 1807, to March 3, 1817. After serving in Congress, he resumed his former business activities. Champion served as commissary general of provisions for army pensioners in 1832.

== Personal life ==
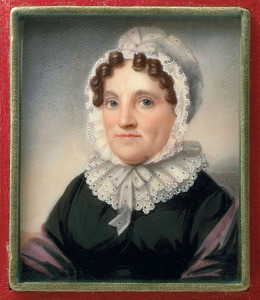
Mrs. Epaphroditus Champion (Lucretia Hubbard) by Anson Dickinson

In 1781, Champion married Lucretia Hubbard (1760–1836). Together, they had three children:

- Lucretia Champion (1783–1882)
- Clarissa Champion (1785–1801)
- Epaphroditus Champion Jr. (1786–1841).

Champion died on December 22, 1834, in East Haddam, Connecticut. He is interred in Riverview Cemetery in East Haddam. His epitaph reads, "Talents, benevolence and integrity characterized his spotless life."

=== Legacy ===
Champion's home in East Haddam is included in the East Haddam Historic District, which is listed on the National Register of Historic Places. The home is named the General Epaphroditus Champion House and was built in a late-Georgian style.

U.S. House of Representatives
Preceded by Theodore Dwight	Member of the U.S. House of Representatives from Connecticut's at-large congressional district March 4, 1807 – March 3, 1817	Succeeded by Uriel Holmes
