= Wheeler Block (Colchester, Connecticut) =

- U.S. National Register of Historic Places
- U.S. Historic district – Contributing property
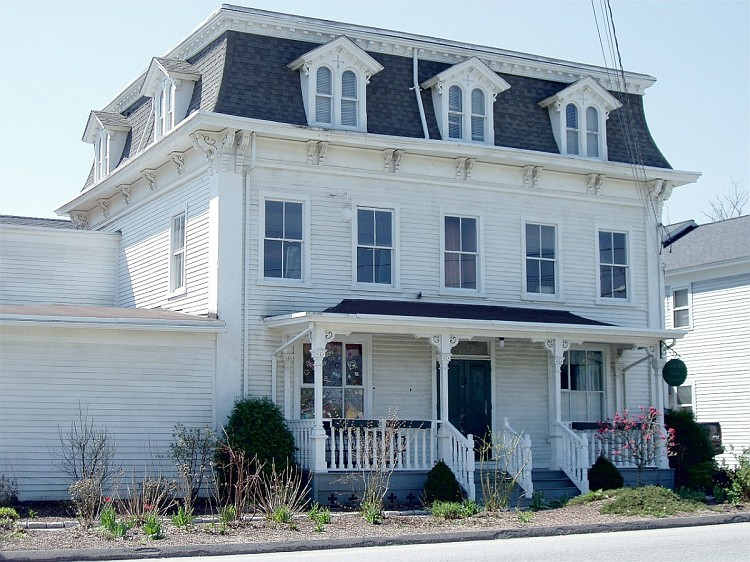

- Location within Connecticut Location within the United States
- Location: 40 Norwich Avenue, Colchester, Connecticut
- Coordinates: 41°34′24″N 72°19′53″W
- Area: less than one acre
- Built: 1872
- Architect: Williams, William A.
- Architectural style: Second Empire
- Part of: Colchester Village Historic District (ID94000254)
- NRHP reference No.: 93000312

Significant dates
- Added to NRHP: April 16, 1993
- Designated CP: April 4, 1994

The Wheeler Block, also known as the Old Town Hall and the former Ransom School, is a historic civic and commercial building at 40 Norwich Avenue in Colchester, Connecticut. Built in 1872, it is a good local example of Second Empire architecture, seeing a variety of civic and commercial uses. The building was listed on the National Register of Historic Places on April 16, 1993.

== Description and history ==
The Wheeler Block is located in the village center of Colchester, facing north across Norwich Avenue to the town green, near the junction with Hayward Avenue. It is a 2 1/2-story wood-frame structure in the Second Empire style, with a mansard roof, bracketed cornice, and gable-roof dormers with paired round-arch windows. A single-story porch extends across the front, with turned balusters and bracketed square posts supporting a low-pitch hip roof. An ell extends to the left of the main block. The interior is mainly the product of alterations made in the 1930s, when it was converted for use as town hall.

The block was built in 1872 by Joshua Wheeler, a local merchant and Mason. The building originally housed commercial businesses in the ground floor and the local Masonic lodge above. The lodge, founded in 1781, was the first in the state east of the Connecticut River, and was a major social organization in the town, remaining an active force in civic events and occupying the building's upper floor until 1970. In 1910 Wheeler's daughter, Emeline Ransom, gave the building to the town, which used it as a schoolhouse until 1936, and as town hall until 1991.

== See also ==
- National Register of Historic Places listings in New London County, Connecticut
