= Henry Champion House =

Historic house in Connecticut

- U.S. National Register of Historic Places
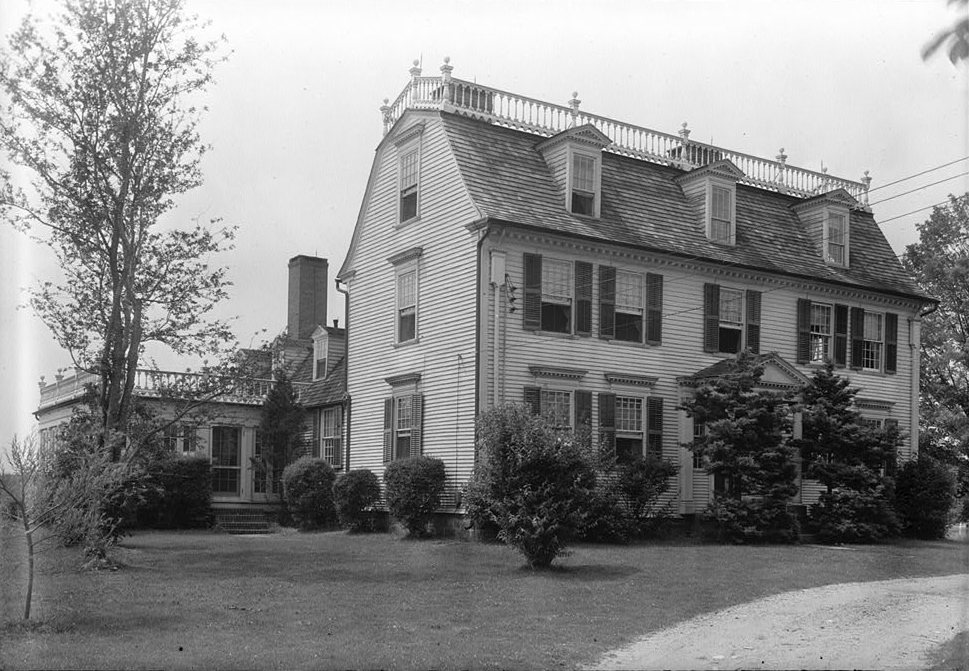
- Champion House in 1940

- Location within Connecticut Location within the United States
- Location: Westchester Road, Colchester, Connecticut
- Coordinates: 41°32′39″N 72°24′50″W
- Area: 5 acres (2.0 ha)
- Built: 1790
- Architectural style: Colonial Georgian-Federal
- NRHP reference No.: 72001323
- Added to NRHP: October 10, 1972

The Henry Champion House is a historic house on Westchester Road in Colchester, Connecticut, built in 1790. It is a good example of Federal period architecture, designed by architect William Sprat. It was built by Colonel Henry Champion, a commissary leader during the American Revolutionary War, for his son General Henry Champion. The house was listed on the National Register of Historic Places in 1972.

== Description and history ==
The Henry Champion House is located on the southern fringe of the village of Westchester in southwestern Colchester, on the west side of Westchester Road at its junction with Pickerel Lake Road. It is a 2 1/2-story gambrel-roofed wood-frame structure, with a gambrel roof and clapboarded exterior. Two brick chimneys are symmetrically placed in the interior, rising behind the main roof ridge. Three gabled dormers project from the steep sloping front face of the roof, and the rear roof line slopes down to the first floor in a saltbox-like profile. The main facade is five bays wide, with a center entrance flanked by sidelight windows and pilasters and sheltered by a gabled portico. First-floor windows are topped by projecting cornices, and the main roof cornice has a line of dentil moulding.

The house was built in 1790 to a design by William Sprat, a Connecticut designer whose residential credits include houses in both Connecticut and Vermont. Colonel Henry Champion built it for his son, also named Henry. Both men played served during the American Revolutionary War, and the younger Champion was a prominent local politician in the state legislature.

== See also ==
- National Register of Historic Places listings in New London County, Connecticut
