= Myron Abell =

American politician (1864–1940)

Myron R. Abell

Member of the Connecticut House of Representatives from Lebanon
- In office 1911–1913 Serving with George H. Hoxie
- Preceded by: Isaac G. Larkin; Elisha Waterman
- Succeeded by: Frank K. Noyes; William A. Watson

Personal details
- Born: November 18, 1864 Lebanon, Connecticut, U.S.
- Died: January 26, 1940 (aged 75) Norwich, Connecticut, U.S.
- Party: Republican

Myron Robinson Abell (November 18, 1864 – January 26, 1940) was an American politician who served in the Connecticut House of Representatives from 1911 to 1913, representing the town of Lebanon as a Republican.

== Personal life ==
Abell was born on November 18, 1864, in Lebanon, Connecticut. He was a member of his local Knights of Pythias lodge, Oliver Woodhouse 51, as the keeper of records and the master of exchequer (treasurer). He was a master of the Colchester Grange, a part of the fraternal organization Connecticut State Grange.

== Career ==
A Republican, Abell was elected to the Connecticut House of Representatives in 1910, and he served one term representing the town of Lebanon alongside fellow Republican George H. Hoxie. He did not run for reelection in 1912, but remained active in politics, being nominated multiple times for Colchester borough office in the 1920s and serving as tax collector.

== Death ==
Abell died on January 26, 1940, in Norwich, Connecticut. He was 75.
