= Henry Champion (American revolutionary) =

American farmer and merchant

Henry Champion (1723-July 23, 1797) was a wealthy farmer and merchant who served as an commissary leader during the American Revolution. His children included Henry Champion (1751-1836) and Epaphroditus Champion (1756-1834).

He was born in East Haddam, Connecticut, the grandson of Henry Champion, an original settler of Saybrook.

He joined the colonial militia and served in the French and Indian War.

During the Revolutionary War in the winter of 1777-1778, he and his son Epaphroditus drove cattle 300 miles to General George Washington's starving soldiers at Valley Forge. He wrote to George Washington about commissary issues.

He had the Henry Champion House built in the Westchester section of Colchester, Connecticut in 1799. It is listed on the National Register of Historic Places.

== See also ==
- Henry C. Deming, grandson
