= Haywardville, Massachusetts =

Coordinates: 42°27′51″N 71°05′29″W

In the early 1800s, Nathaniel Hayward bought remodeled shoe mills in Stoneham, Massachusetts from Elisha Converse, founder of the largest rubber shoe manufacturer in the world, the Boston Rubber Shoe Company in Malden. Straddling Spot Pond Brook, the village was the site of early industrial development which later blossomed into larger factories. The factory grew to be an industrial community that has come to be known as Haywardville. It is here where Hayward and Charles Goodyear invented slickers (canvas and rubber coats) and the process of vulcanization. The factory produced a variety of rubber products including boots, pails and spittoons. There were numerous large factory buildings here during this period, a community of living quarters, some shops - or at least places to barter for goods.

== Decline ==
Industry in Haywardville began to decline as larger, more successful businesses overshadowed those in the village. It is believed that at least four mills were using the tiny Spot Pond Brook at one time. Another possible source of decline was the rapid development of both steam and electric power. The fatal blow was the taking of Haywardville's water rights by the communities of Medford, Malden and Melrose. By this time, the mostly deserted Haywardville was bought by the Commonwealth of Massachusetts in 1894 as part of the effort to create a park system around Boston. It helped form the Middlesex Fells Reservation.

All of the buildings from what used to be known as Haywardville were relocated to Ravine Terrace and Brook Street, both in Stoneham. The remaining lands were restored by Charles Eliot, noted protege of Frederick Law Olmsted Jr., prominent urban landscaper. This site was instrumental in the creation of the larger Metropolitan Park System, the first in the United States.

== Today ==
Today, only traces of Haywardville remain in the Fells. The site is accessible by trails in the Virginia Wood, part of the Spot Pond Archeological District. Trail maps are available at the nearby Botume House.

== Gallery ==
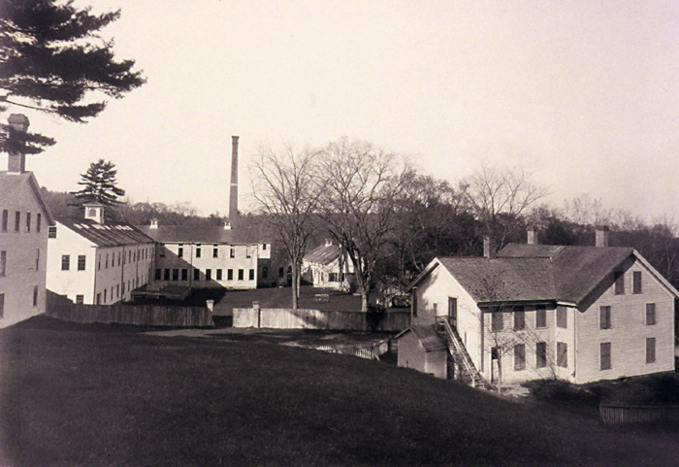

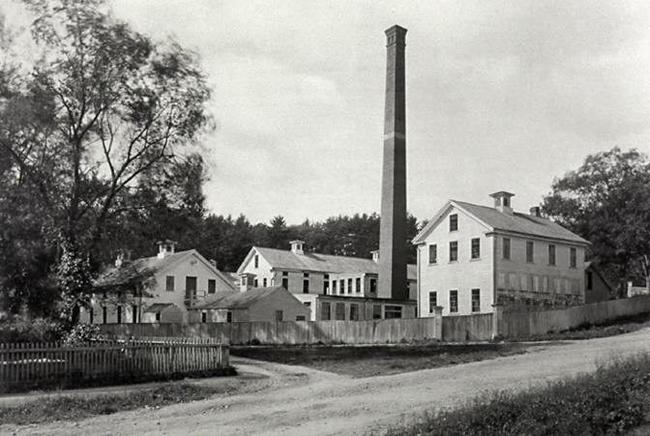

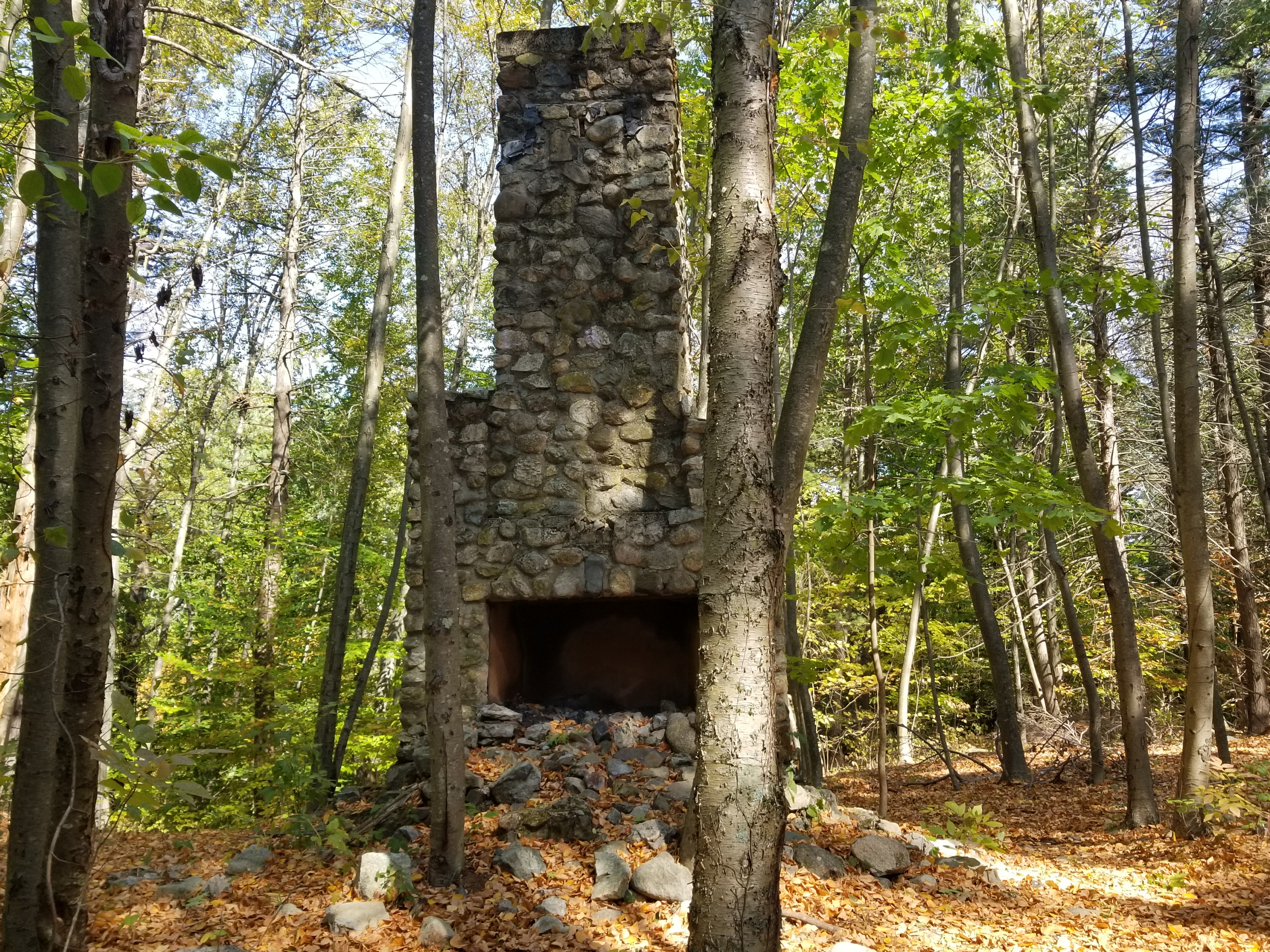
