= Henry Champion (general) =

American general

General Henry Champion
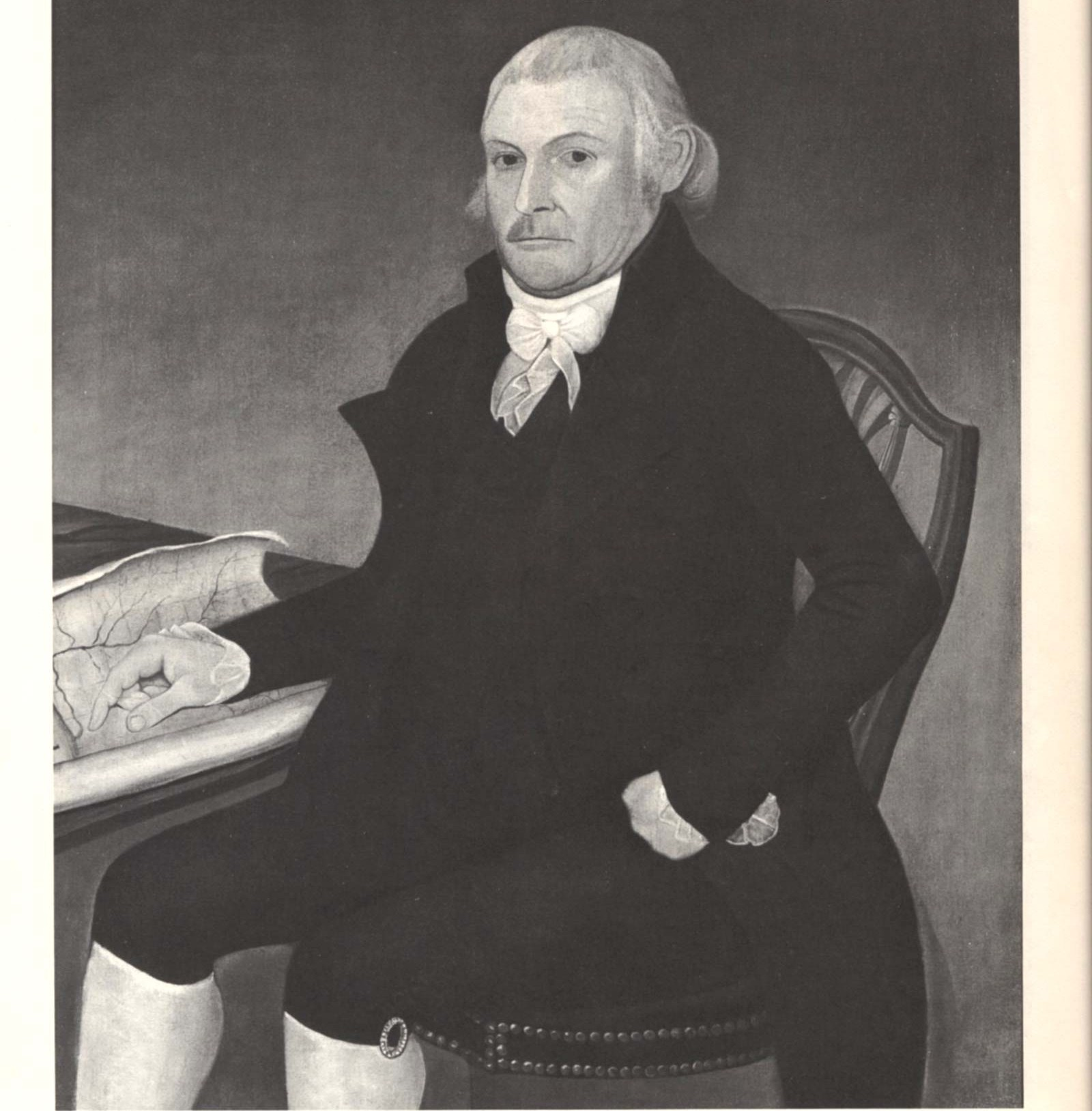
- Henry Champion III
- Born: March 16, 1751; Westchester, Connecticut
- Died: July 13, 1836 (aged 85)
- Occupations: War veteran, politician and landowner
- Spouse: Abigail Tinker
- Children: Henry, Aristarchus and Aristobulus
- Parent(s): Colonel Henry Champion, Deborah Brainard

General Henry Champion (March 16, 1751 – July 13, 1836) was a military leader, politician, and deacon born to Colonel Henry Champion and Deborah Brainard. He was a descendant of the Henry Champion who settled in Connecticut in 1647. He sailed to the colony from Norwich, England.

== Early life ==
Henry Champion III was born in Westchester, Connecticut. He was the eldest of 7 children born to Colonel Henry Champion. His brother General Epaphroditus Champion was born in 1756 and also became a staunch Federalist.

== Family ==
On October 10, 1781, Henry married Abigail Tinker, daughter of Sylvanus and Abigail (Olmstead) Tinker. Their family included four sons and four daughters, all born in Westchester:

- Henry (1782–1823); who married Ruth Kimberly Robbins (1782-)
- Aristarcus, twin (1784–1871); he died in Rochester, NY, unmarried
- Aristobulus, twin (1784–1786); died young
- Abigail (1787-); married General David Deming
- Harriet (1789–1823); married Joseph Trumbull (1782–1861), governor of Connecticut
- Maria (1791-); married Robert Watkinson
- Elisa, twin (1797-); married Elizur Goodrich
- William, twin (1797–1798); died young

== Military service ==
Henry Champion entered into service in the Continental Army at the Lexington Alarm. He served as Ensign for 22 days before being promoted to 2nd Lieutenant of the Eighth Company, Second Regiment on April 26, 1775. In May, he became a 1st Lieutenant of the same. He was one of the men who fought at Bunker Hill. January 1776 be was again promoted to Adjutant on the staff of Col. Samuel Wyllys. One year later, on January 1, 1777, he was commissioned a captain in the 3rd Connecticut Regiment.

July 15, 1779, Captain Champion was detached from his old regiment and appointed Acting Major of the First Battalion Light Brigade. The Light Brigade had been organized by General George Washington to attempt the capture of Stony Point on the Hudson. The corps was composed of men picked from all regiments and under direct command of General Washington. The 3rd Connecticut Regiment was consolidated with the 4th Connecticut Regiment into the 1st Connecticut Regiment on January 1, 1781. Champion resigned his commission in the 1st Connecticut Regiment on May 1, 1781 when he was appointed commissary general of the Eastern Department. He served until the close of the Revolutionary War, and is today represented in The Society of the Cincinnati in the state of Connecticut, established in 1783.

== Post-war ==
After returning home to Westchester, Gen. Champion entered the life of politics. He was Deputy from Colchester to the Connecticut Assembly in 1789, 1793 to 1798 and 1800-1805. From 1806 to 1817 he held the office of Assistant. In 1806 and 1807, he was a Judge of the Connecticut Supreme Court of Errors. From 1813 to 1828 he was a deacon in a church in Westchester. General Champion always celebrated July 15 which he called Stony Point Day, in due and ancient form at his famous old country seat in Westchester. He obtained a charter for the Phoenix Bank of Hartford, because the State Bank had refused him the accommodation of $2,000. "Well," said he, "if this bank can't accommodate me, I will have one that can."

He was largely interested in the Connecticut Land Company to which he subscribed over $85,000. The towns of Champion, NY and Champion, OH are named in his honor.

After his death, in 1836, the Champion Homestead was sold to the Loomis Family and Henry's male line had died out in 1865.

== Henry Champion House ==
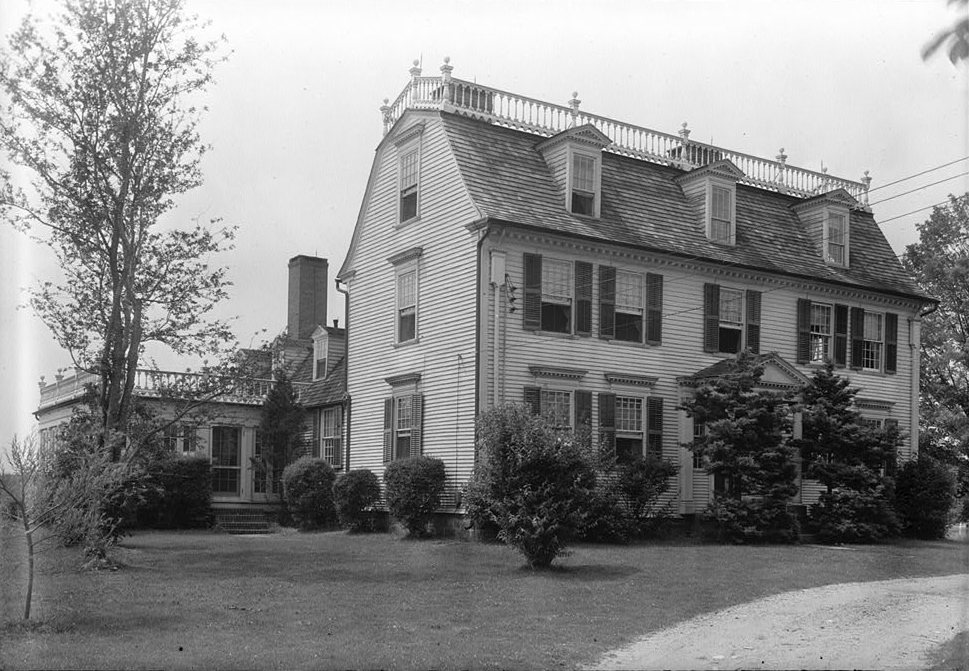
Champion House in 1940

The Henry Champion House was built for the general by Colonel Henry Champion, his father, in 1790. The house was built in the Colonial Federal style. Today the Champion house still stands and is located on Westchester Rd in Colchester. It is listed on the National Register of Historic Places. The house is now privately owned and not open to the public.
