= Old Bacon Academy =

- Bacon Academy
- U.S. National Register of Historic Places
- U.S. Historic district – Contributing property
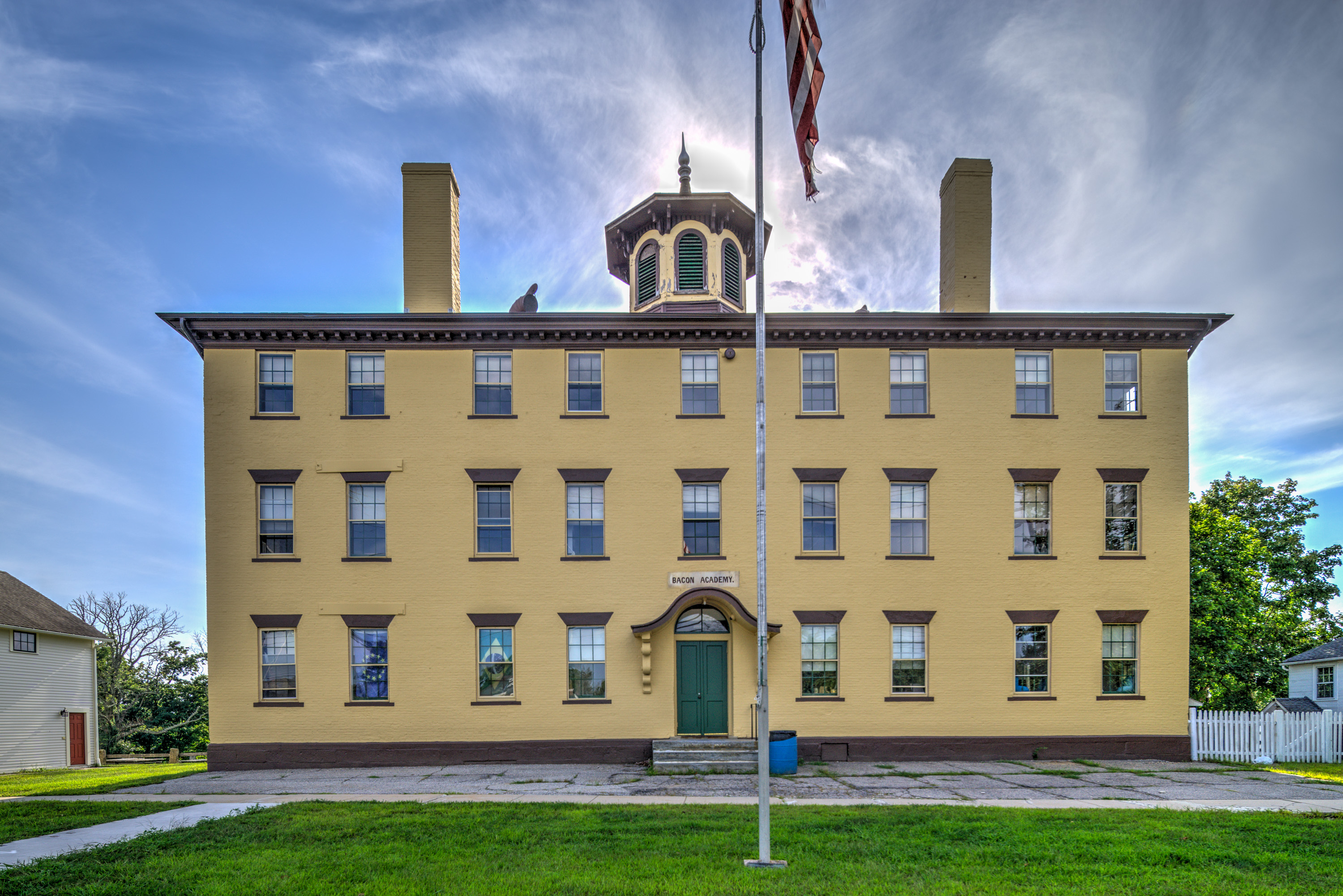

- Location within Connecticut Location within the United States
- Location: 84 Main Street, Colchester, Connecticut
- Coordinates: 41°34′24″N 72°19′59″W
- Area: 0.4 acres (0.16 ha)
- Built: 1803
- Architectural style: Italianate, Federal
- Part of: Colchester Village Historic District (ID94000254)
- NRHP reference No.: 82004364

Significant dates
- Added to NRHP: April 27, 1982
- Designated CP: April 4, 1994

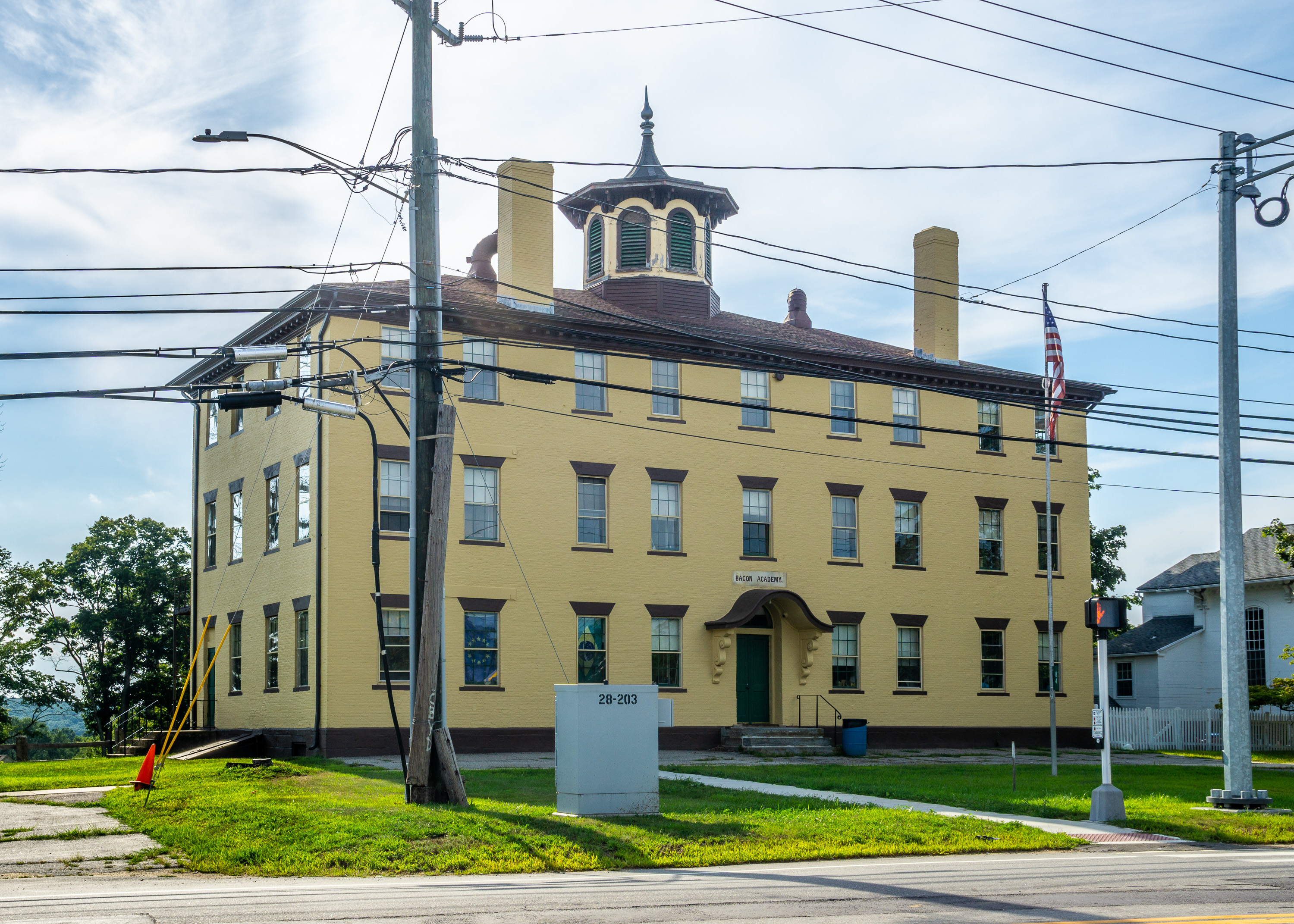
2020 view

The Bacon Academy, often referred to as the Old Bacon Academy, was the original Bacon Academy. It was built in 1803 and is located at 84 Main Street, Colchester, Connecticut. The main structure is a 70 feet (21 m) long by 34 feet (10 m) wide three-story Flemish bond brick structure with Federal style details, noted for its plain, utilitarian floor plan consisting of two rooms off a central hall and stairway. The Day Hall is a contributing property purchased by the Bacon Academy trustees in 1929, a church hall that was used for the high school until 1962.

Bacon Academy originally only admitted white males, but it integrated non-white children around 1833 and began to educate females in 1842. The school has educated important figures such as Edwin Denison Morgan, Morgan Bulkeley, William A. Buckingham, Lyman Trumbull, and Morrison Waite. The structure's utilitarian style, combined with its Federal details, led the National Register of Historic Places to recognize it as architecturally significant. The Old Bacon Academy building is used today as part of an alternative education program, and Day Hall is used as a nursery. The properties were added to the National Register of Historic Places in 1982.

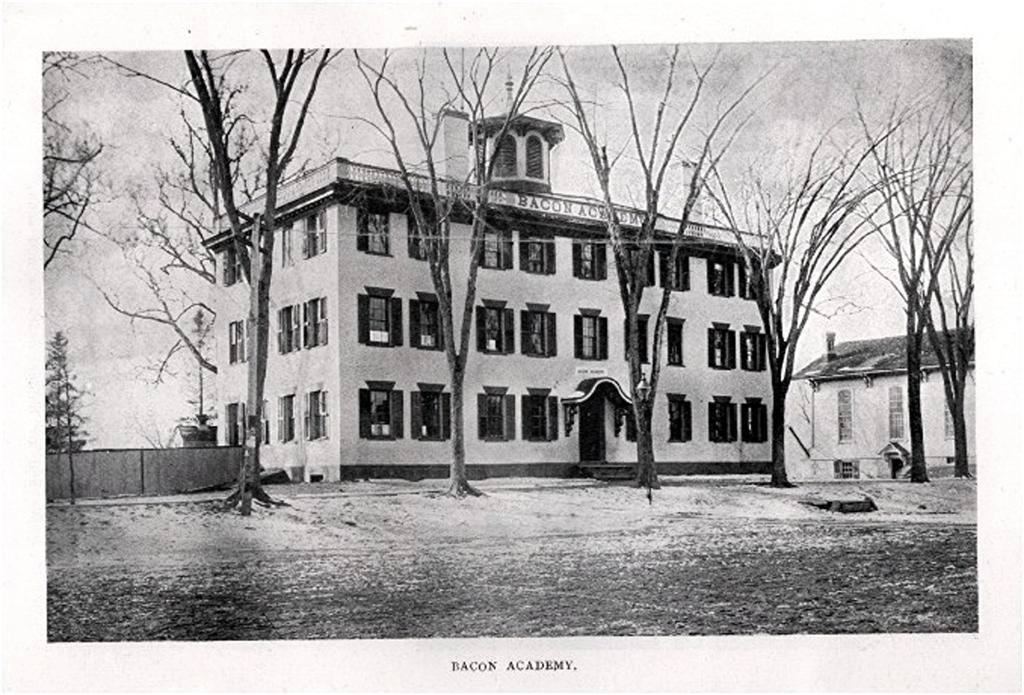
The building as photographed in 1896

== Design ==
Bacon Academy is named for Pierpont Bacon, a prosperous farmer who died childless in 1800. Bacon bequeathed most of his property and assets to the First Society of Colchester to support schooling. The trustees decided to build an academy to educate young men to prepare for the public workforce. It was completed in 1803 for the cost of $7000. The main Bacon Academy structure is a 70 feet (21 m) long by 34 feet (10 m) wide three-story Flemish bond brick structure with Federal style details. The foundation of the academy is made of fieldstone with a facing of dressed granite blocks. The bricks were produced on a local farm for use in building Bacon Academy. The front facade has 26 windows arranged in 9 bays with gaps for the chimneys in between the second and third bay from the corners. The sash windows are six-by-six. The hipped roof originally had four chimneys, with two matching on the west and east sides, but only the east chimneys remain today. In the 1982 nomination, the roof was reported to have asphalt shingles.

The building was altered in 1890, with two additions of Victorian architecture, the first being the main entrance. An arched awning with incised consoles is above the fanlight. The other addition was the octagonal cupola on the roof over the original bell tower which dates from 1830. The exterior of the school has complementary colors. The walls are painted a cream color, while the foundation, doors, window trims, and cornices are a chocolate-brown.

The interior of the building was termed "severely plain" and utilitarian for its simple design of two large rooms on each side, with a central hall and stairwell. Each room was lighted naturally by the windows and had a chimney for the iron stoves on the east and west ends of the building. The oak floors were installed in the early 20th-century, and the ceiling was covered with modern acoustical tiles. The third floor is a shallow attic that gives access to the cupola. The ceiling and roof framing is supported with two king-post trusses at the ends of the main ridge. The basement is divided in two and supported by summer beams that run the length of the sills; each is supported by posts on stone pedestals. By 1982, steel I-beams were inserted under the floor joists and between the summer beams and the sills. The cellar also has an old furnace that is not in service, as the building has electrical heating.

The other contributing property is Day Hall, a church hall that was built in 1858. It was used for high school purposes from 1929 until the new Bacon Academy was completed in 1962. It was then used as a kindergarten and offices for the trustees. The one-room church hall has a basement and a T-shaped addition dating to around 1928. It has a steep gabled, hipped roof. The entrance has two modern fire doors that lead to an auditorium and gallery on the east and a stage on the west end.

== Operation ==
The school was originally only for white male students, with non-white children using a separate facility, but integration occurred 30 years later. The school also began to educate females in 1842. The academy's endowment was its sole provider of funding for more than 100 years, but the town began contributing funds to the institution in 1939, resulting in the loss of complete control of its own affairs. The trust provided a "small percentage" of Bacon Academy's funding at the time of its National Register of Historic Places nomination in 1982.

Today, the Bacon Academy building is used by the school as part of an alternative education program, and Day Hall functions as a nursery school. The school is rented by the Board of Education for around $21,000 a year, and the Bacon Academy Board of Trustees says that the operational costs are between $25,000 and $28,000 a year. According to the Colchester Public Schools website, "the Mission of the Alternative Education Program is to provide academic, social, and emotional supports for students at risk of dropping out of high school."

== Importance ==
The National Register of Historic Places nomination submitted Bacon Academy as being important because it represents the changes in social attitudes and ideas of education. The academy is also associated with numerous influential and prominent figures. The school was responsible for educating New York governor and senator Edwin Denison Morgan, Connecticut governors Morgan Bulkeley and William A. Buckingham, Iowa senator Lyman Trumbull, and Chief Justice Morrison Waite. The architectural significance and merit of the structure is only impeded by its Victorian-era cupola. It was listed on the National Register of Historic Places in 1982.

== See also ==
- National Register of Historic Places listings in New London County, Connecticut
