= Ezra Hall Gillett =

American clergyman and author

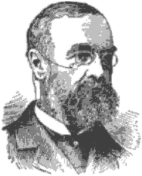

Personal details
- Born: July 15, 1823 Colchester, Connecticut
- Died: September 2, 1875 (aged 52) New York, New York
- Education: Yale University; Union Theological Seminary
- Occupation: Clergyman, writer

Ezra Hall Gillett (1823–1875) was an American clergyman and author.

== Biography ==
Ezra Hall Gillett was born at Colchester, Connecticut on July 15, 1823. He graduated in 1841 at Yale, and in 1844 at the Union Theological Seminary, and became pastor of a Presbyterian church in Harlem, N. Y. In 1868 he was appointed professor of political economy, ethics, and history in New York University.

He died at his home in Harlem on September 2, 1875.

== Works ==
In addition to numerous contributions to the theological reviews, he published works, including:

- Life and Times of John Huss (1863–64)
- History of the Presbyterian Church in the United States (1864)
- The Moral System (1874)
