= Nathaniel Hayward =

American inventor (1808–1865)

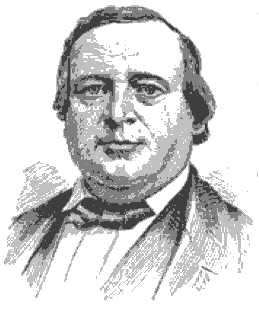
- Born: Nathaniel Manley Hayward; January 19, 1808; Easton, Massachusetts
- Died: July 18, 1865 (aged 57); Colchester, Connecticut
- Occupations: Businessman, inventor

Signature
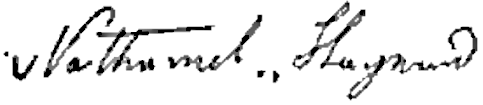

Nathaniel Manley Hayward (January 19, 1808 – July 18, 1865) was an American businessman and inventor best known for selling a patent to Charles Goodyear that Goodyear later used to develop the process of vulcanization.

== Biography ==
Nathaniel Hayward was born in Easton, Massachusetts on January 19, 1808.

Hayward met Goodyear in 1837 and shared with him the discovery he had made, almost accidentally, while working at a rubber factory in Roxbury, Connecticut. He bought some mills in Stoneham, Massachusetts, from Elisha S. Converse, which later became a small settlement called Haywardville.

He died in Colchester, Connecticut on July 18, 1865.

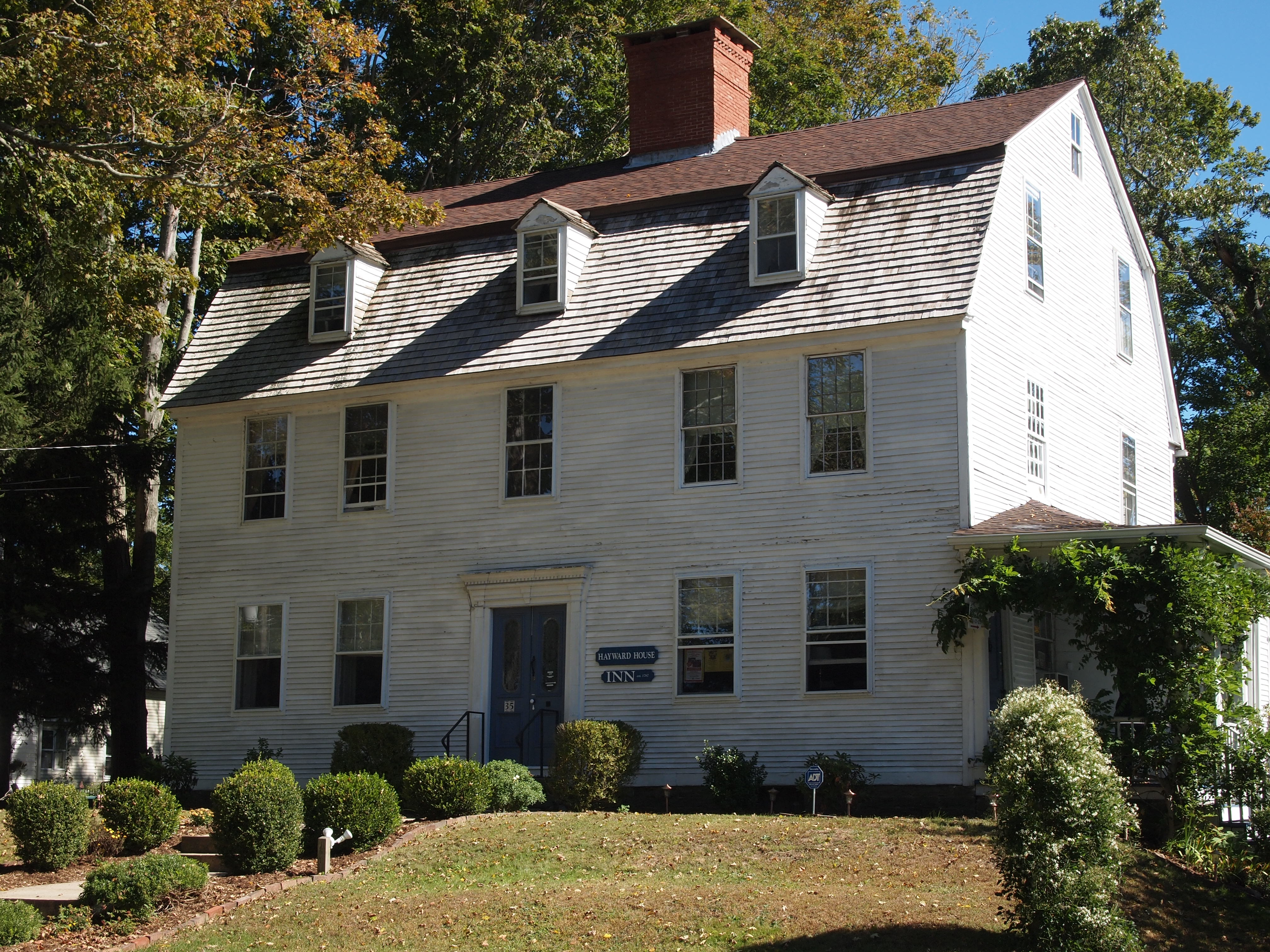
Nathaniel Hayward's House in Colchester, CT, now on the National Register of Historic Places

Hayward's former home in Colchester has been listed on the National Register of Historic Places since 1972.
