= Colchester Village Historic District =

Historic district in Connecticut

- U.S. National Register of Historic Places
- U.S. Historic district
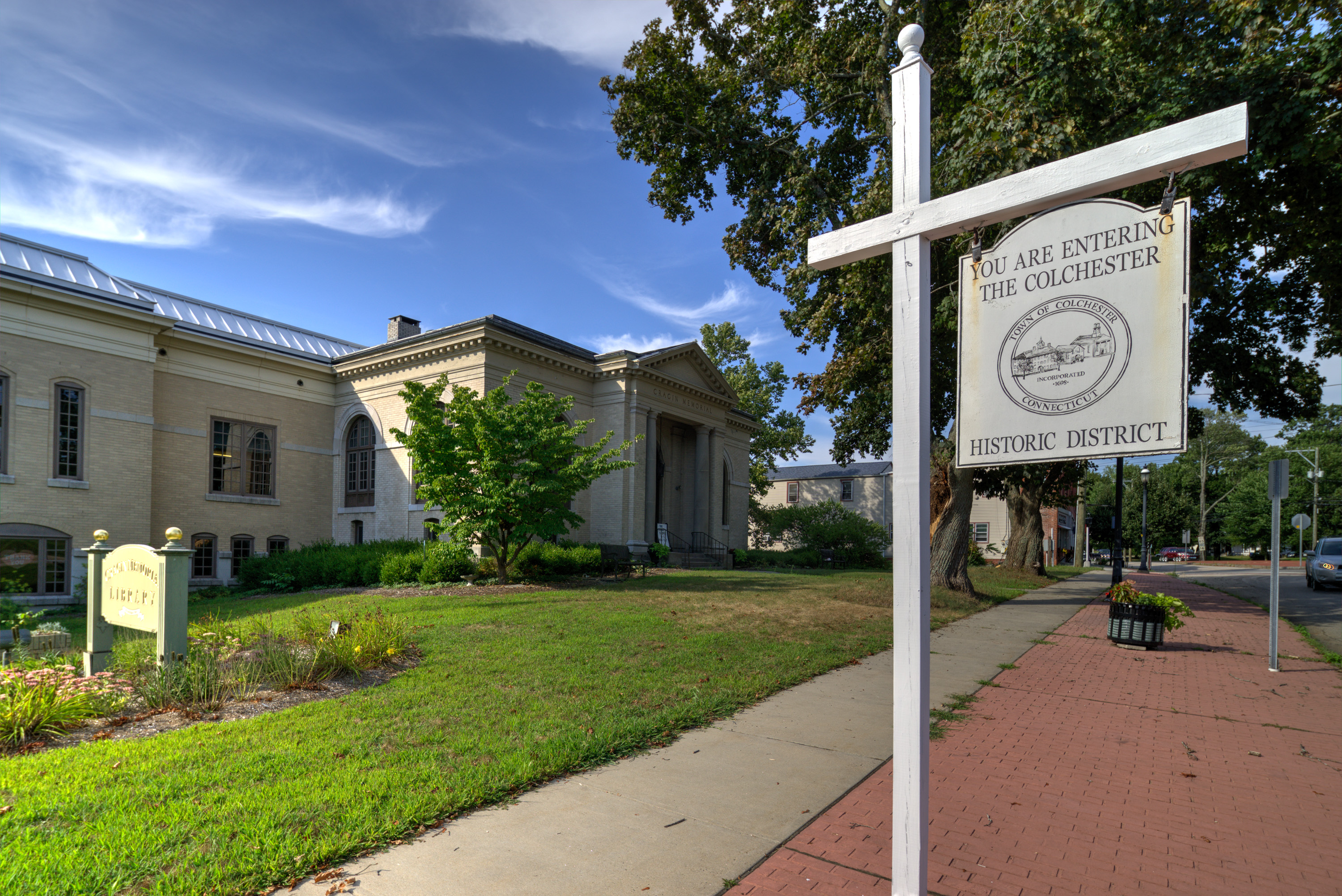
- A sign in front of the Cragin library signals the start of the historic district
- Location: Roughly, along Broadway, Hayward, Linwood and Norwich Avenues, Cragin Court, Pierce Lane, Stebbins Road, Main and South Main Streets, Colchester, Connecticut
- Coordinates: 41°34′28″N 72°19′54″W
- Area: 75 acres (30 ha)
- Architect: Multiple
- Architectural style: Greek Revival, Federal, Colonial
- NRHP reference No.: 94000254
- Added to NRHP: April 4, 1994

The Colchester Village Historic District encompasses most of the village center of Colchester, Connecticut. It is located at the junction of Route 16, Route 85, and Norwich Avenue (old Route 2). The district extends to the northwest along Broadway Street (Route 85) as far as Jaffe Terrace; east along Norwich Avenue to Pleasant Street; south along South Main Street to Hall Hill Road; west along Linwood Avenue (Route 16) to Kmick Lane. The historic district was listed on the National Register of Historic Places (NRHP) in 1994.

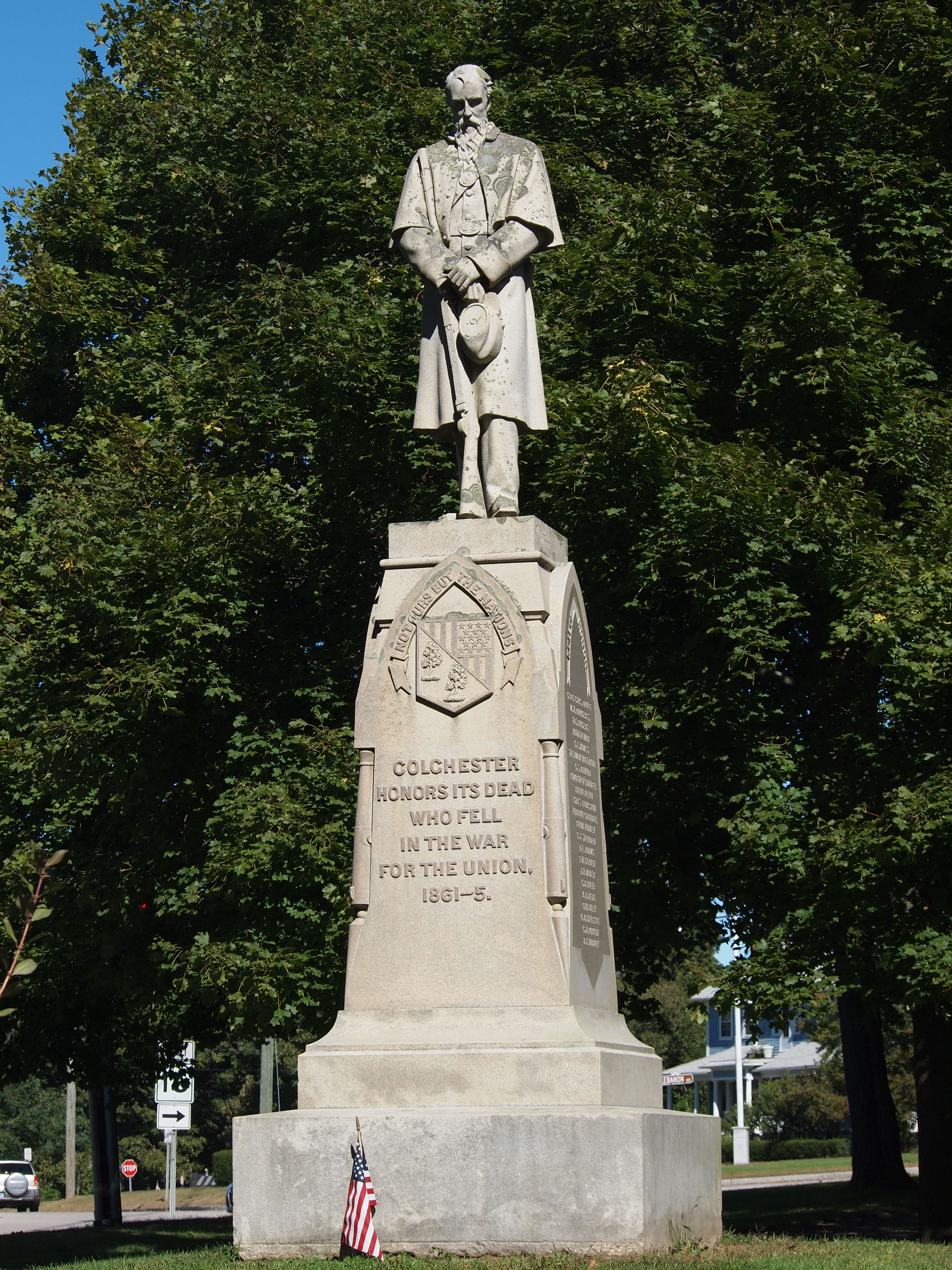
Civil War monument on the Green (1875)

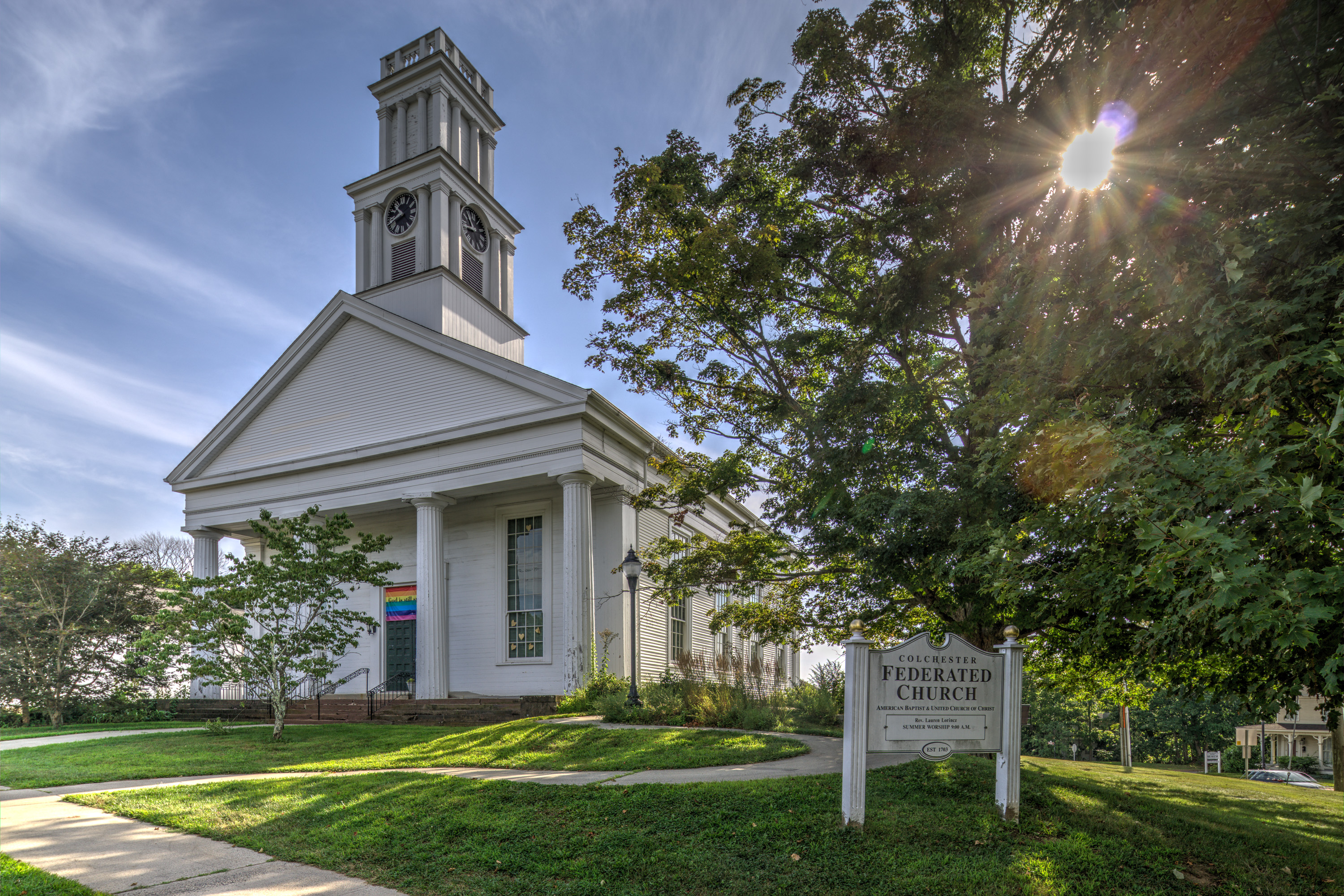
Colchester Federated Church, 60 Main St

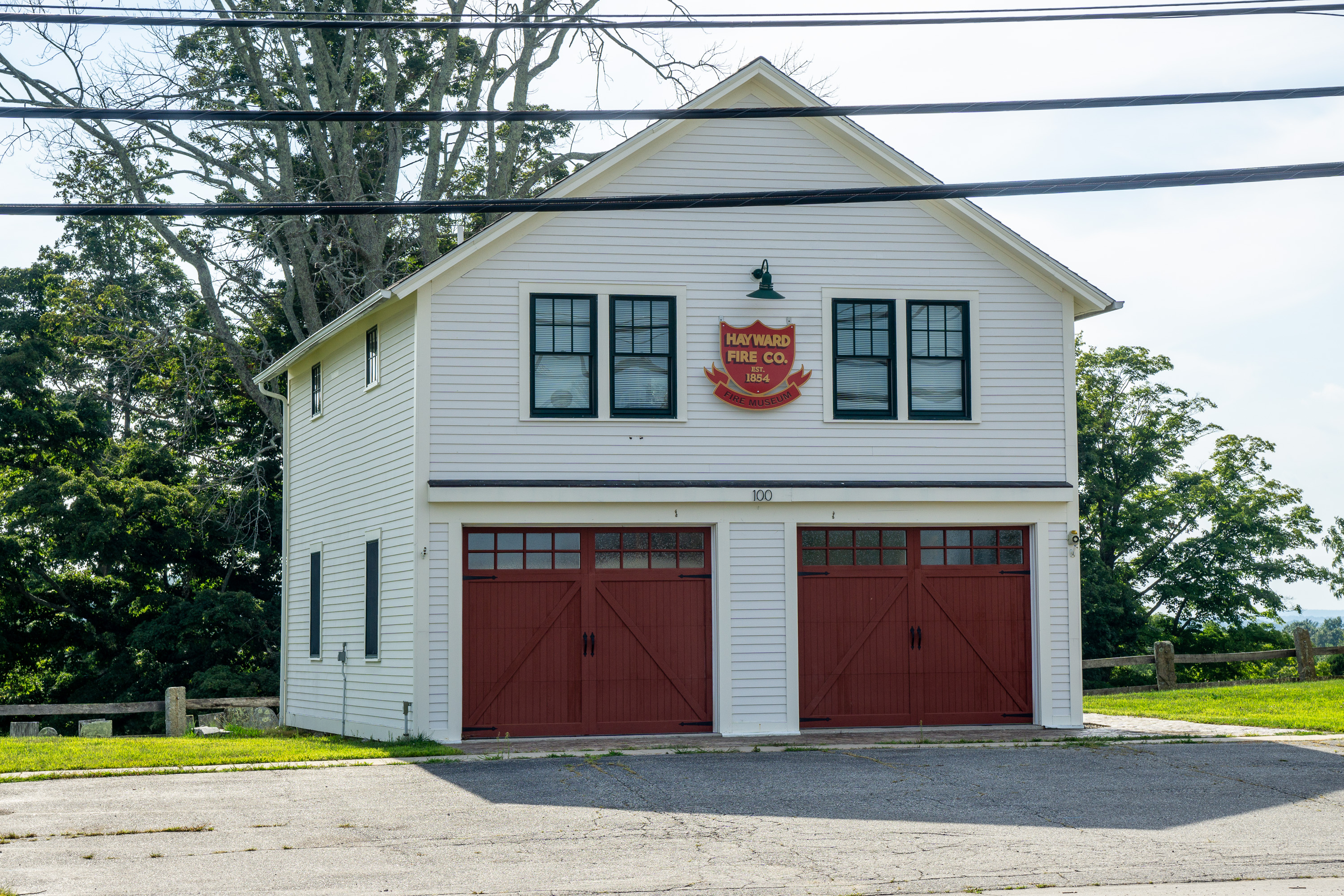
Hayward Fire Co. Museum

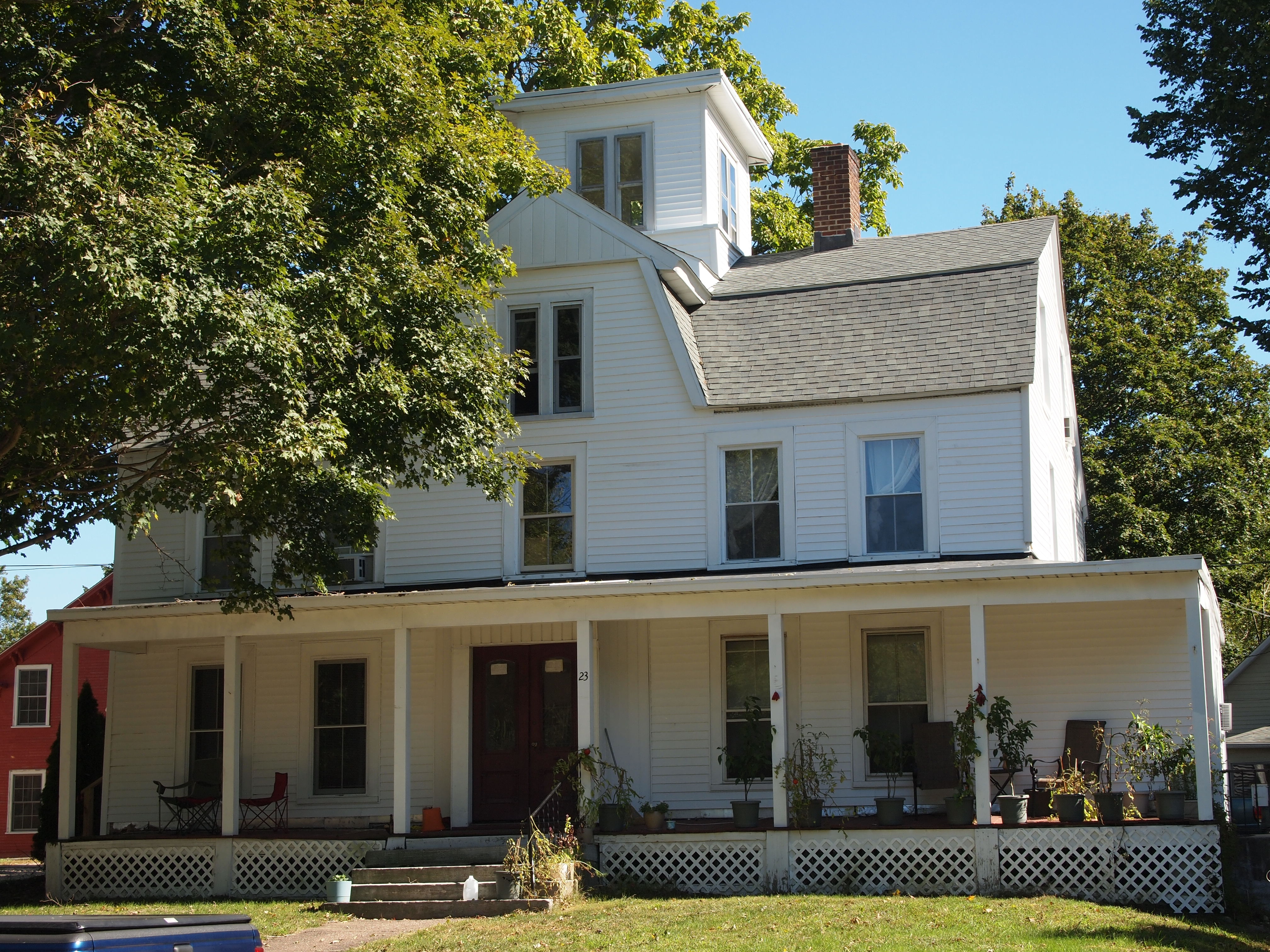
A home on Hayward Avenue

The Colchester Town Green is located at the center of the district. Several commercial, residential, and civic buildings surround the green, with the Colchester Federated Church in the Greek Revival style and the Bacon Academy being the dominant structures. The Hayward House is located on Hayward Avenue across the street from the green and is now being used as a bed and breakfast. Wheeler Block, the original town hall, is located across the green to the south on Norwich Avenue.

Colchester was incorporated in 1698 as a dispersed agricultural community. The village center formed around the town's first colonial meeting house and burying ground, with the area's economic importance later cemented by its location as a crossroads of several early 19th century turnpikes. Bacon Academy was founded in 1803 as the region's first secondary school, and the town was home to the first Masonic lodge in the region (founded 1782). In the second half of the 19th century, the village benefited from the rise of small industries, prompting the construction of a number of commercial buildings, including the Second Empire Wheeler Block.

== See also ==
- National Register of Historic Places listings in New London County, Connecticut
