= Bed rug =

Heavy embroidered bed covers

Bed rugs are heavy, embroidered bed covers made primarily in the United States from the mid-1600s through the early 1800s. The earliest were made in eastern Massachusetts, though many have been found in the Connecticut River Valley. They involve wool stitching on either wool or linen backings. They differ from other embroidered coverlets in that bed rugs embroidery covered the background fabric, and in many cases the looped stitches were cut to form pile.

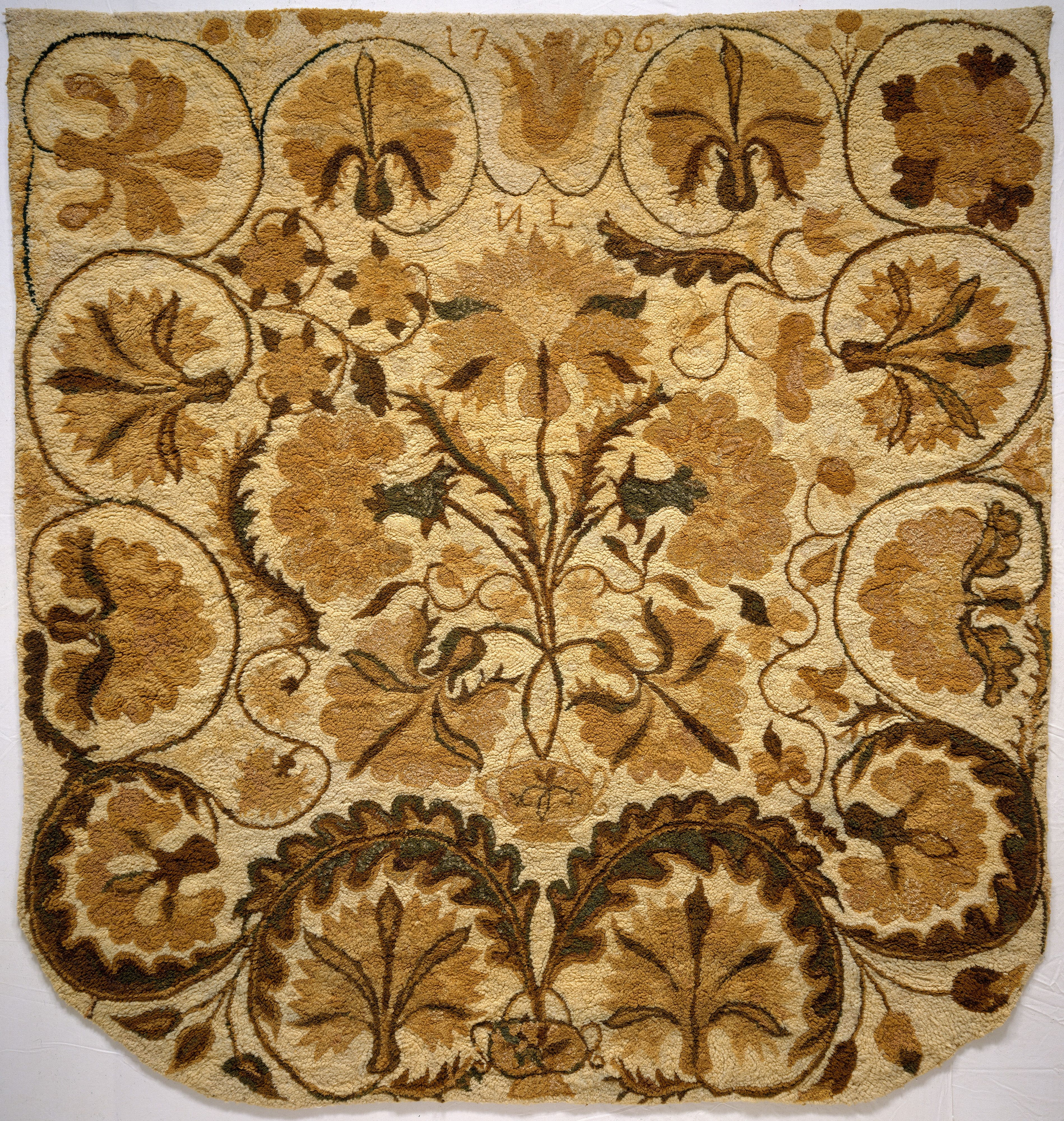
Bed rug from Colchester, CT made in 1795 (Metropolitan Museum of Art)

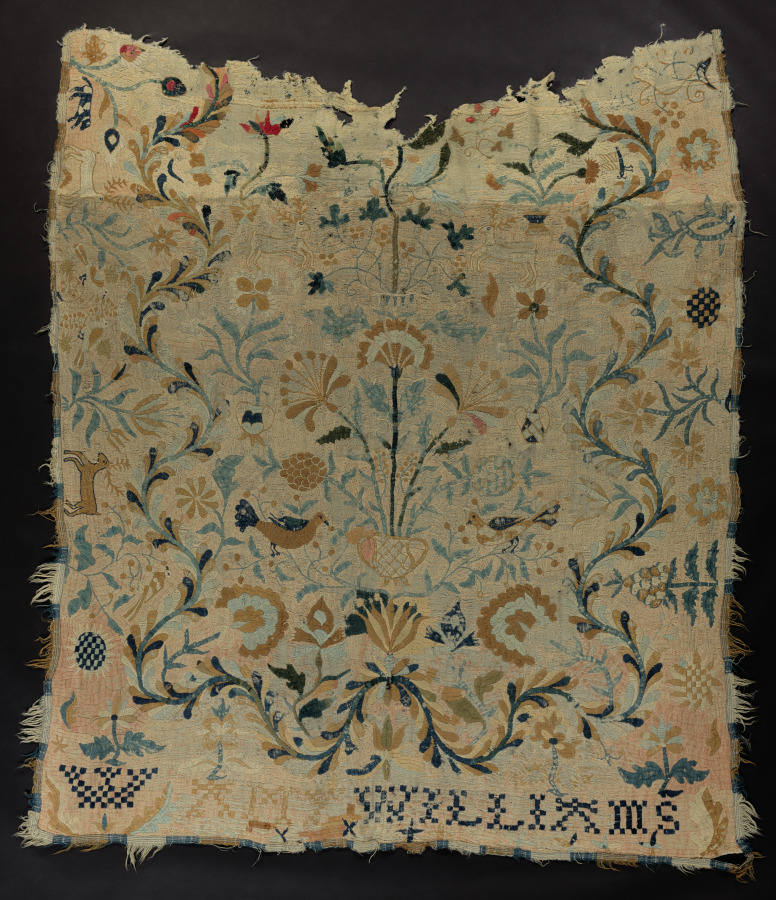
Embroidered bed rug, America, late 18th century (Cleveland Museum of Art)

== Description ==
Bed rugs (or "ruggs") were rough handwoven and hand-decorated textiles meant to serve as the topmost layer of bedding, particularly in cold weather. Bed rugs are heavy, feature either pile or a smooth face, and are worked in multicolor wool yarns on a woven foundation. The tufting process is described in connection with the Rebekah Harris bed rug of 1776 on loan to Colonial Williamsburg:

"The tufted pile was created by using 7-10 strands of wool yarn, pulled through the background material with a large needle, in loose, 1/2"-5/8" running stitches. The stitches are long, loose floats on the surface and short (approximately 3/8") on the backside, which cover the entire background fabric."

Some examples have rounded corners for the bottom of the bed, and a straight edge for the top. They were often signed or initialed and dated, possibly due to the large amount of work required to make them.They were produced in the 17th through early 19th centuries. Bed rugs began as carpet-like textiles, and were more common in 18th century than floor rugs. In his Draper's Dictionary (1882), William Beck noted that the term rug was only used in America to describe the coverings for ordinary beds.

Sources provide conflicting information about bed rugs. Older sources have become dated as bed rugs have been more closely examined, and as additional records and examples have been found. For example, early authors mentioned that these bed rugs were hooked, when in fact they are not.

Two other varieties of bed rugs have been identified, but with very few examples. One rug has been found in which a supplementary weft was used in weaving, which was cut to form small tufts of evenly-cut wool. Six examples have been found that involve Turkish knots worked on a woven background.

=== Top layers of bedding ===
Beds often held a prominent place in colonial households, and early household inventories show that bed coverings were amongst the few textile decorations in a house. Bed hangings and various types of bed coverings, including bed rugs, were both decorative and practical.

There is difficulty in determining exactly what the earliest bed rugs looked like in America, and how they differed from a coverlet, because no examples have survived from the 1600s, although there are records of them from this early period. Indeed, when Homer Eaton Keyes, the editor of Antiques magazine, first came upon a bed rug in 1923, he described it as "a wool-on-wool bedcover " and thought that the example he had encountered was one of a kind. Another type of bed covering, quilts, were believed to be popular. However, a historian who examined wills and probate records from Essex County, Massachusetts dated between 1635 and 1674, found that pieced quilts were rare due to their expense. Bed rugs and coverlets were far more likely to be listed in these inventories. There is a difference between embroidered bed rugs and other embroidered covers: bed rugs are entirely covered with embroidery.

== History ==
A 1656 inventory of Mistress Glover's Cambridge Massachusetts household items listed a number of rugs used as bed furnishings. In an examination of hundreds of early American household inventories, the words "bed" and "rug" had only been found together twice as of 1972, when the source was published. Both inventories were from Roxbury, Massachusetts. In 1733, a felt maker had 3 bed rugs and in 1746, a man had one smaller and one larger bed rug. These early uses were probably to distinguish a rug used on a bed compared to one used on a table.

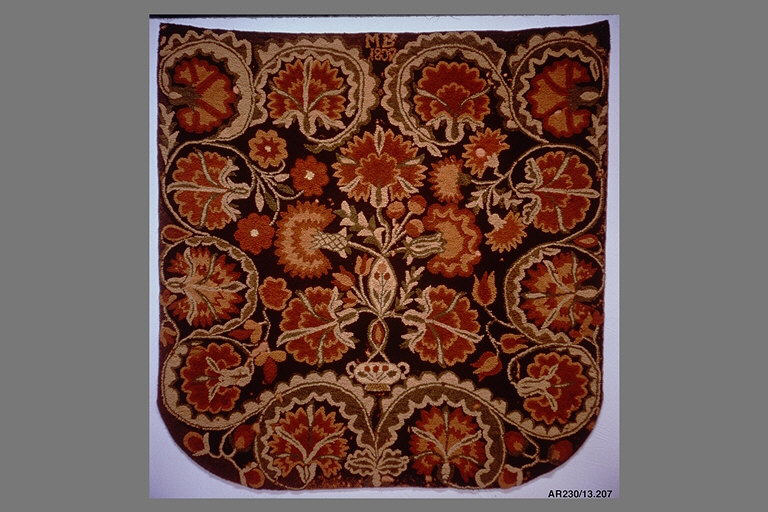
Bed rug from 1809 in the collection of the Metropolitan Museum of Art.

Many of the surviving bed rugs have been found in the Connecticut River Valley, but others were produced elsewhere in New England, including Vermont, New Hampshire, and beyond. The reason that bed rugs were meant as the top layer of bedding was due to their weight. They needed to be able to be thrown off when temperatures were more moderate.

Embroidered bed rugs are an original American art form, one that was not commercial, but rather produced entirely in a household, from the woven fabric to the prepared sheep wool, spun and dyed, and then the design and stitching of the rug. They served as a testament to the needlework abilities of the lady of the house.

== Designs ==
The maker of each bed rug selected and executed their own design, whether it was original or from a pattern book. An 1803 bed rug owned by the Fairbanks family of New Hampshire features a carnation motif. This same motif is found in approximately a dozen other bed rugs from the Connecticut River Vallely. Pattern books obtained from England included this type of motif, and may have been the source of designs for some of the bed rugs. The bouquet of flowers growing from a small receptacle can be traced to the Indian Tree of Life pattern: this design has been found on the Metropolitan Museum's 1796 bed rug as well as one of Historic Deerfield's bed rugs. The flame stitch pattern worked in bright wool yarns is another design found in bed rugs, as are hearts and flowers. There were no pattern books specifically for bed rugs. Women used the same pattern books as they did for samplers and crewel embroidery.

== Materials ==
The wool yarn used was hand-dyed, and when rug backgrounds required a large amount of yarn, variations in color can be observed. This indicates that additional yarn had to be dyed to have enough. Blue is the most frequent color used, because it was easiest to get. Brown and undyed yarns were also used. Additional colors used were: green, gray, black, orange, purple, yellow, tan, and red. Natural dyes were often used to obtain these colors: indigo for blue, walnut hulls for brown, madder for reds and fustic for tans and yellows.

The needles used to make bed rugs would need to be large in order to handle the wool. Needles were likely it was made of wood or bone.

== Stitches ==
Extant bed rugs were sewn with a running stitch using multi-plied yarn on wool or linen woven fabric. The stitches were formed with loops on the top of the fabric and running stitches on the back. The front loops could be cut to form pile, which caused them to be confused by some with hooked rugs. Running stitches worked in parallel rows become darning stitches, and bed rugs from Colchester, Connecticut employed darning stitches to work patterns such as diaper stitch (diamond-shaped), stripes, and checks. These bed rugs did not use the looping running stitch, but rather a flat one.

== Artifacts ==
It is estimated that about 60 bed rugs have survived, though additional bed rugs continue to be found. Several of these rugs are noted below, but the best source for a complete listing with information about the makers of the rugs is Bed Rugs: 18th and Early 19th Century Embroidered Bed Covers by Jessie Armstead Marshall.

A 1786 bed rug made by Lorrain Collins of Connecticut displays a number of the features of bed rug. It has the rounded bottom corners, is extremely densely stitched using homespun wool and a woven wool ground, and uses the Tree of Life pattern. What sets it apart from many bed rugs is that it uses a complex patterned darning stitch throughout rather than the looped running stitch.

The 1796 bed rug from the Metropolitan Museum of Art, pictured at the start of this article, is made of wool yarn on plain weave cloth. The pile has been cut unevenly, and some loops remain uncut. The rug was found in the Jonathan Deming house in Colchester, CT.

Historic Deerfield in Massachusetts includes six examples of bed rugs in their online collection, made in a variety of ways. There is a 1780 bed rug that is embroidered with wool yarn that looks very much like a crewel work of the time. It does not use the pile technique. This rug is attributed to Abigail Foote of Colchester, CT. Another, from Cummington Massachusetts, was made in 1801, and does use the pile technique. The museum entry for this 1801 bed rug includes numerous photographs of details, which clearly show the floral design. There is also a bed rug that was made sometime between 1790 and 1830, probably in New England. Unlike the others in the museum's online collection, this one does not have rounded edges on one end. The pattern is quite different from the other three noted here. It is striped and features a double-stitched pile of heavy, 6-ply yarn.

Colonial Williamsburg's museums own or have on loan several bed rugs. One of these, which has a combination of cut and uncut pile and rounded bottom edges, was made by Rebekah Harris (b. 1749) of New London, Connecticut in 1776, two years before her marriage to Lieutenant Joseph Hale, the brother of Nathan Hale, Revolutionary War soldier and spy for the US.

The collections of the Museum of Fine Arts, Houston include two bed rugs. One, from 1782, is attributed to Jerusha Foote Johnson of Colchester, CT. She was a member of the family who produced several bed rugs, such as the 1780 rug at Historic Deerfield. This 1782 bed rug is worked in shades of blue wool, and has a pile surface. The second bed rug at the Museum of Fine Arts, Houston is from 1804, made by Lucy Williams Lathrop. The pile-surface rug is from Lebanon, CT, and features the same design as the 1796 bed rug in the collection of the Metropolitan Museum of Art.

== See also ==
Bedding
