= Colchester, Connecticut =

- Town
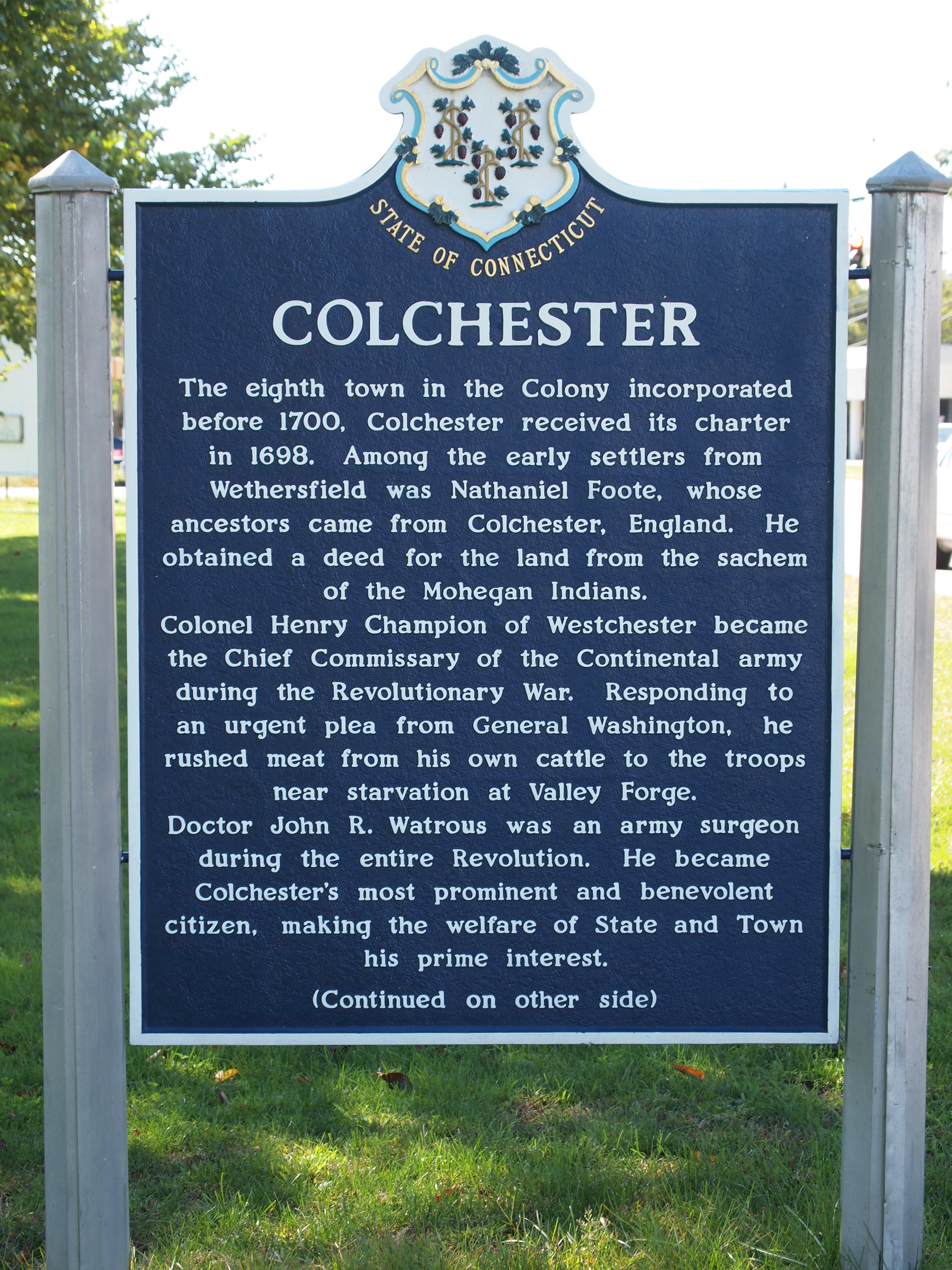
- Town of Colchester historical marker

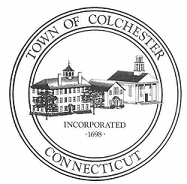
- Flag Seal
- Interactive map of Colchester, Connecticut
- Coordinates: 41°34′33.4″N 72°19′56.3″W
- Country: United States
- U.S. state: Connecticut
- County: New London
- Region: Southeastern CT
- Incorporated: 1698 / 1699

Government
  - Type: Selectman–town meeting
  - First Selectman: Bernard Dennler

Area
  - Total: 49.8 sq mi (129.0 km^{2})
  - Land: 49.1 sq mi (127.1 km^{2})
  - Water: 0.73 sq mi (1.9 km^{2})
- Elevation: 551 ft (168 m)

Population (2020)
  - Total: 15,555
  - Density: 317.0/sq mi (122.4/km^{2})
- Time zone: UTC-5 (Eastern)
  - Summer (DST): UTC-4 (Eastern)
- ZIP Codes: 06415, 06420
- Area codes: 860/959
- FIPS code: 09-15910
- GNIS feature ID: 0213409
- Website: www.colchesterct.gov

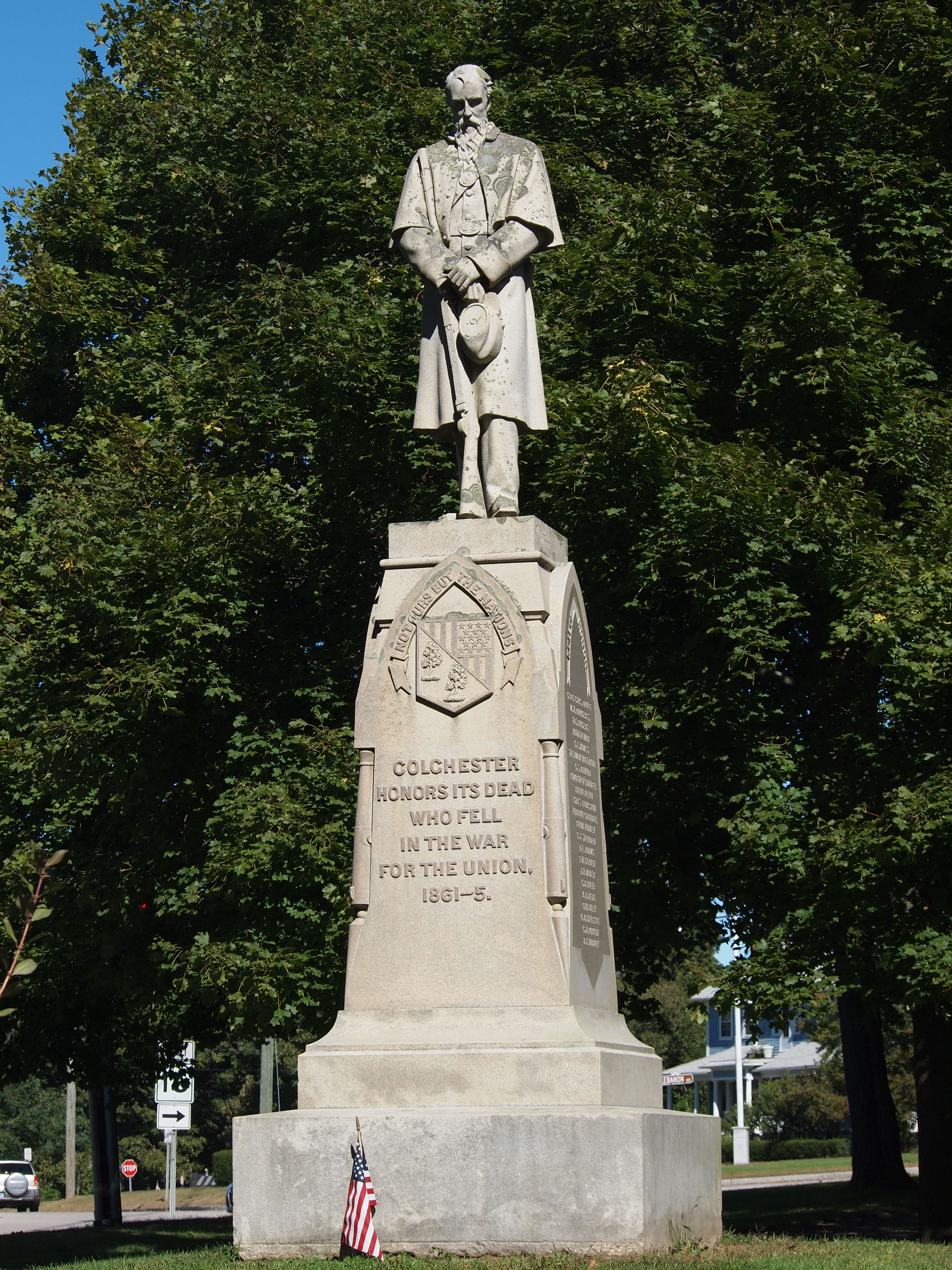
Civil War monument on the Green (1875)

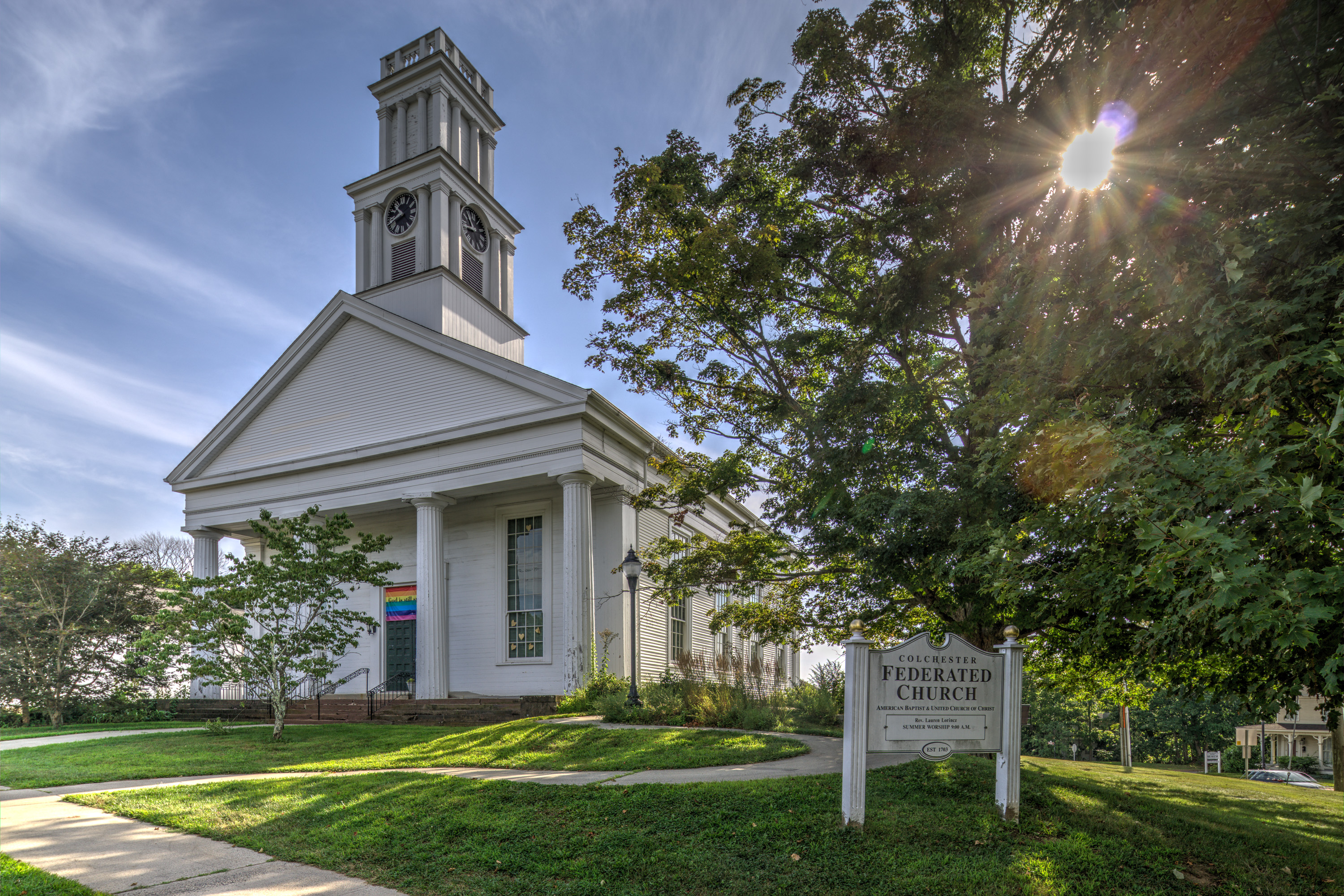
Colchester Federated Church

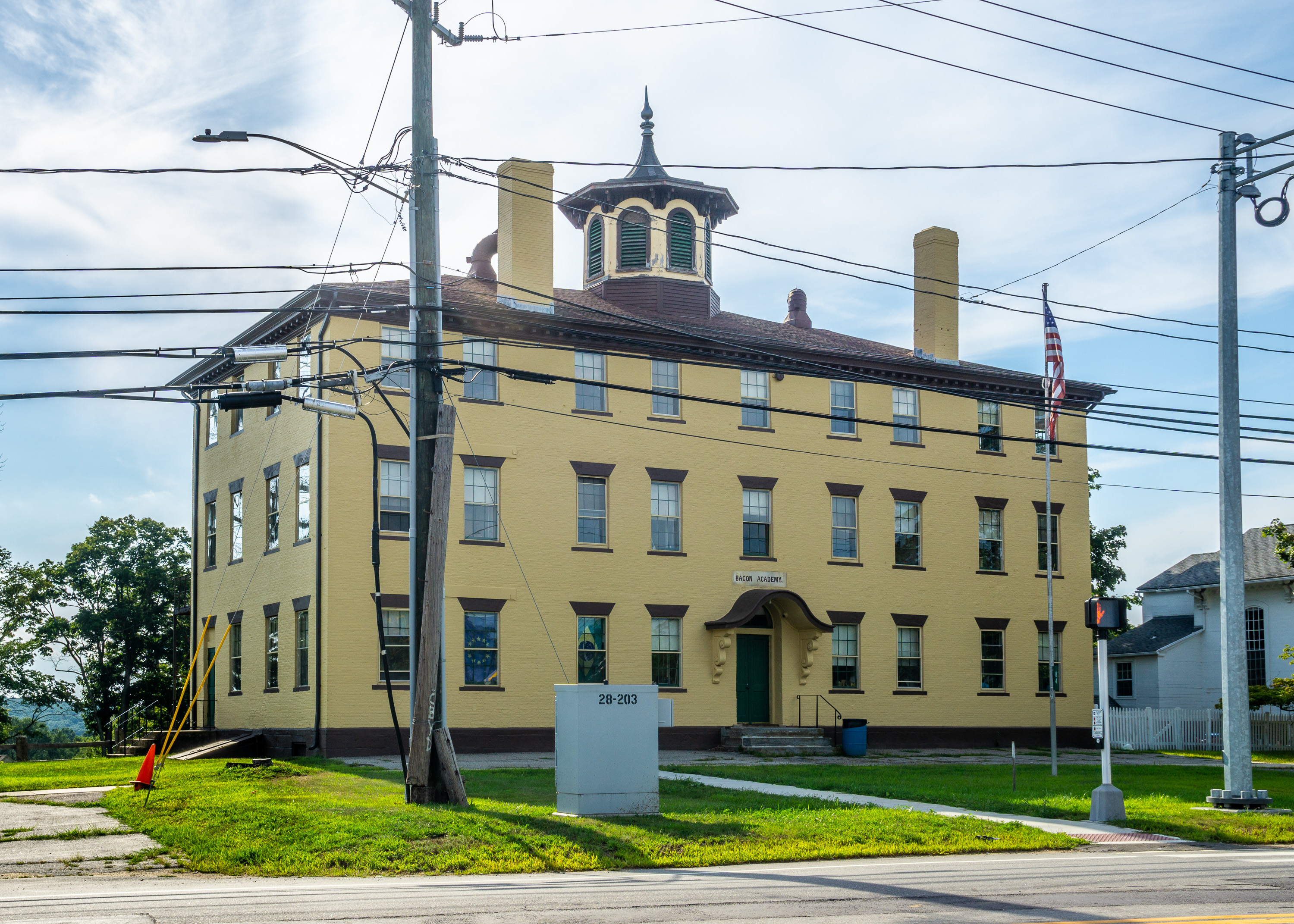
Old Bacon Academy

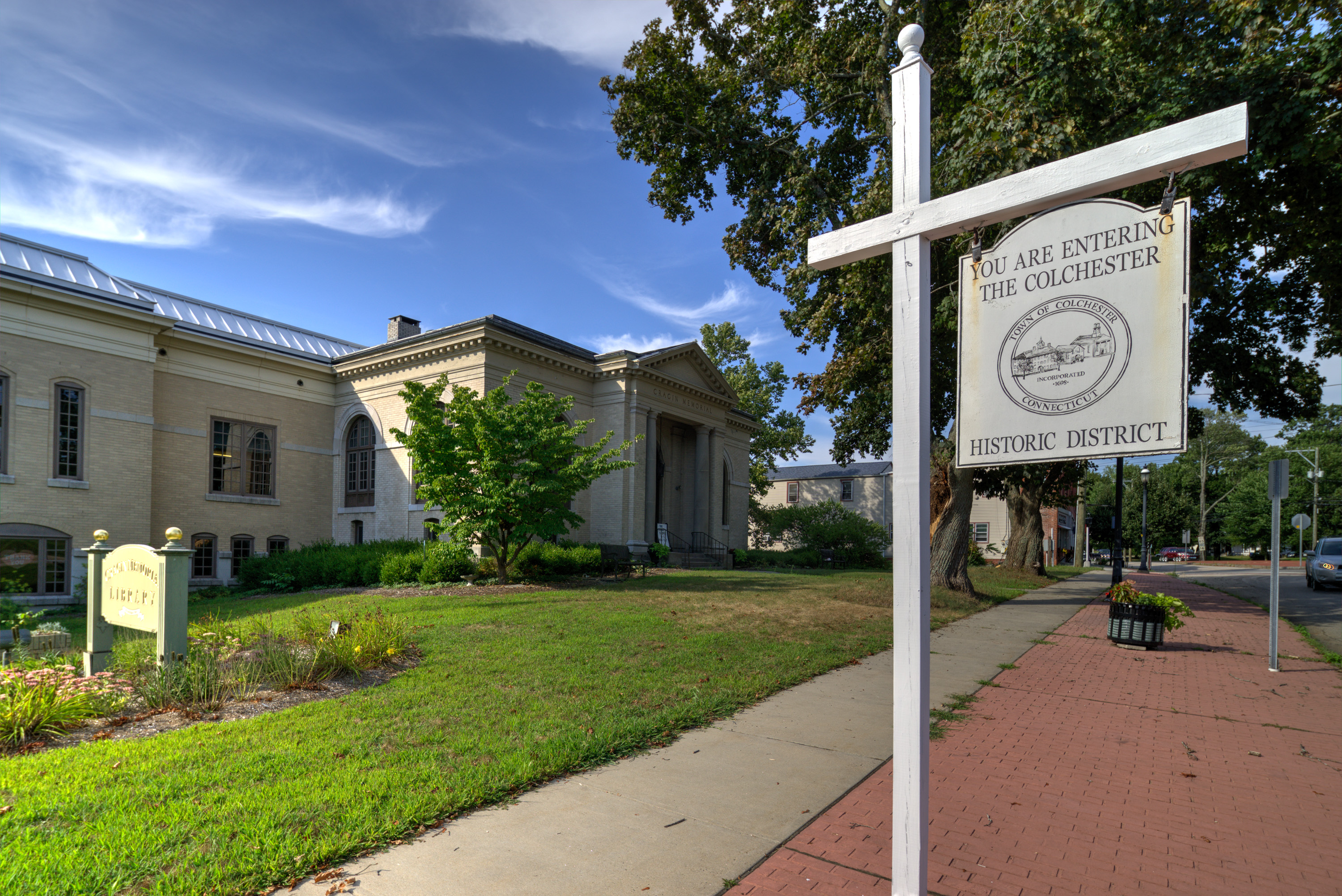
Cragin Memorial Library

Colchester is a town in New London County, Connecticut, United States. The town is part of the Southeastern Connecticut Planning Region. The population was 15,555 at the 2020 census. In 2010 Colchester became the first town in Connecticut, and the 36th in the country, to be certified with the National Wildlife Federation as a Community Wildlife Habitat.

The villages of Westchester and North Westchester are located within Colchester. The town center village, which was previously incorporated as a borough, is a census-designated place, with a population of 4,700 at the 2020 census.

The Colchester area was part of the Mohegan territory at the time of European settlement. Several members of the Paugussett tribe currently reside in Colchester, where the tribe (which also has a heritage property in Trumbull) has a larger and more recently acquired 106-acre (0.43 km^{2}) reservation.

The Colchester Historical Society operates a local history museum.

== History ==
=== Pre-Township and Becoming a Township ===
On March 31, 1661, the original settlement of Colchester was founded by Jeremy Adams on a 340-acre area of land, then known as "Jeremiah's Farme." The land was given to Jeremy by Uncas, Sachem of the Mohegan tribe.

When Connecticut's first counties were created in 1666, Colchester stayed under Adams' ownership and was not incorporated into any new county, possibly because of its proximity to both Hartford and New London County. It would not formally join a county until 1698. At this time, Colchester was mainly a farming community. In 2009, Colchester adopted a right-to-farm ordinance, recognizing the "significant role" that agriculture played in Colchester's "heritage and future."

On October 13, 1698, Michael Taintor II, Samuel Northam and Nathaniel Foote III applied to officially settle Colchester. Jeremiah's Farme was selected as the main point of reference for the town, with its north boundary as the Twenty Mile River. The southern side is bordered by Lyme, and the west boundary meets the east bounds of Middletown and Haddam. The east and northeast boundary runs to the bounds of Lebanon and Norwich. During the initial settlement, the area was also referred to as the Plantation of the Twenty-mile River.

On May 11, 1699, the town's principal founders asked the general court of Hartford for assistance, alleging that several persons had hindered the advancement of the settlement by claiming ownership of "considerable tracts of land" within the grant. They also asked to be transferred under the jurisdiction of the New London colony and for the town to be recognized as Colchester. On May 11, 1699, the court approved their request, officially establishing Colchester as a town of New London. The town is named after Colchester, a city in Essex, England, where many colonists had emigrated from and from which Foote's grandfather, Nathaniel Foote, was born.

=== The 1700s ===
Nathaniel Foote and his family were some of the first to settle here and finished building their house in 1702. The house began construction in 1699 by Nathaniel Foote III and was then finished by his son Nathaniel Foote IV. On November 29, 1703, a saw and grist mill were voted to be built by Israel and Samual Wyatt if they promised to maintain the mill for the town's use. The first schoolmaster began operations in 1705, and a schoolhouse was finished in 1711. In 1707 or earlier, a cemetery was built behind where Bacon Academy would later be built. The cemetery later held people like Reverend John Bulkeley, Dr. John Watrous, Pierpont Bacon, and his wife, Abigail Bacon. In 1708 Colchester re-joined Hartford county, and a second religious meeting house was built. On December 31, 1712, at a legal town meeting held in Colchester, Capt Gilbert Wyatt and Mr. Darnell Clark were Chosen, Selectmen. On December 28, 1713, Samuel Northam, Thomas Day, and Ebenezer Colman were chosen for a school committee ensuing year.

At a town meeting on June 12, 1716, it was voted to finish the schoolhouse where the foundation of the said house was the only partly standing. The selectmen Committee for the school has agreed with Nathaniel Loomis Jr. (He and his family are from Windsor) to keep school for twelve months and give him twenty-five pounds and ten shillings. He began to keep building the school. On December 8, 1729, Ensign Foote, Ensign Wells, and Israel Newton were chosen as Selectmen. The constables were selected at the same meeting, being Joseph Chamberlain and Isaac Jones. On June 3, 1774, Stephen Goodwin wrote to the Hartford Courant that he had a runaway slave. The slave was named Jefferey and rode away on horseback. A reward was said to be given out if said horse or Jefferey was found (6 dollars for Jeffery and 4 for the horse).

In 1756 Colchester's population was 2,300 people. In 1761 Michael Taintor built Taintors Farm, which stayed in the family until the early 20th century. The Nathaniel Hayward house was built in 1775 for Dudley Wright; The house was lived in by Dr. John Watrous and his wife (who was Dudley Wright's daughter). The house was later sold in 1848 and lived in by Nathaniel Hayward. The lawn of this house was the original town green. In 1777 Breed's Tavern was built, which is most known for being one of the two remaining sites associated with the Wooster Masonic Lodge. In 1782 Colchester had 3,300 inhabitants. Several men went into the revolutionary war, many of them died. One of which was Ephraim Little Jr., son of the 2nd Reverend of Colchester. In 1783 Colchester rejoined New London County after being within Hartford County. On Thursday, January 29, 1784, Congress suggested a tax, and the representatives of Colchester (Capt. Buckley and Col. Worthington) voted not to have it go into effect. In 1785 the Foote Family house was built by Nathaniel Foote and was lived in by his family. The Henry Champion House was built in 1790 by architect William Sprat. for Colonel Henry Champion who was active in the revolution as a commissary leader and his son Henry Champion, a military leader during the Revolutionary War.

Starting in the mid-1700s, Colchester was a hub for the making bed rugs, heavy embroidered bed covers that were both decorative and served to keep New Englanders warm in the cold winters. Colchester bed rugs are important for their strong designs and complex embroidery. Several women from the Foote family, including Mary Foote, Abigail Foote, and Jerusha Foote Johnson, all have bed rugs attributed to them.

=== The 1800s ===
On October 13, 1803, the town of Marlborough, Hartford County was created from parts of the towns of Colchester, Glastonbury, Hartford County, and Hebron, Tolland County. In the 1807 election for governor of Connecticut, Colchester voted 105 for Trumbull and 12 for Hart, a majority for Trumbull. On May 27, 1807, heavy cattle losses were reported because of stray dogs biting them. The following year (1808), Colchester voted for Trumbull’s re-election (135 to 24). In 1810 Colchester voted for the governor, 82 for Treadwell, 61 for Griswold, and 16 for Spalding. On March 6, 1821, John Turner sold the southern green to Bacon Academy Trustees for $100 ($2,800 in 2018). A hatter came in 1828. In 1836, a town description was written in "Connecticut Historical Collections" stating that excellent quality iron ore was found. Colchester was hilly and stony in some parts of town. Hebron’s furnaces later used the ore in 1899. In "Connecticut Historical Collections" the school for colored children is mentioned; considering this book was released in 1836, the school could not have been more than 43 years old. Unbeknownst to John Barber (the writer of this book), he got to see it only four years before its ending. On August 8, 1844, Special Park Committee meeting reported costs to acquire 3 1/2 acres of land plus costs of posts and rails to line the perimeter for $398 (about $13,000).

In March 1850, The borough petitioned for a special meeting for land donation by Nathaniel Hayward. His proposal was a donation of land if the borough laid a tax of $1,000 to defray expenses of fences and grading land (about $32,000). The proposal was approved. In 1851 Work was completed for the new Town Park. The borough passes ordinances to ban cows from the park. Borough records showed the town immediately designated the park as a source of income. This included land rental for circus, shows, and sales of grasses and hay.

==== Colchester Bank ====
The first known mention of the bank, was on June 19, 1856, when the Senate agreed to pass a bill incorporating the bank. On October 11, 1856, the bank's stockholders met and decided on a board of directors. They are as follows, Albert B. Isham, Stephen Brainard Day (Isaac's Buell's brother), William G. Buell, and Samuel F. Jones Jr. (who would later be the main accomplice in the Colchester bank scandal). In the same meeting, Isaac Biglow Buell (the cousin of Harvey Post Buell, a successful druggist, and pharmacist in Colchester) was chosen as president. The bank reportedly began the same day.

=== The 1900s ===
==== The Great New England Hurricane of 1938 ====
On September 21 and 22, 1938, Colchester was slammed by a hurricane. The state of Connecticut was inundated with between 5-10 inches of rain and wind gusts of anywhere from 100–125 miles per hour. Reportedly, the Colchester Town Green resembled a "small lake with cascading streams"

At the time, the town had a number of Dutch Elm trees that were planted in 1850. While the root systems of Dutch elms are extensive, they are also quite shallow. As the hurricane hit on September 21, the shallow root systems were ineffective at keeping the trees rooted in the already saturated ground. These trees fell on many buildings, vehicles, and power lines across town. This blocked roads and left many people without homes.

=== The 2000s ===
In July 2005, Colchester was named by CNN's Money Magazine, the 57th best place in the U.S. to live in and is celebrated every year with a festival on the last Saturday of September called 57 Fest.

== Geography ==
According to the United States Census Bureau, the town has a total area of 49.8 square miles (129 km^{2}), of which 49.1 square miles (127 km^{2}) is land and 0.7 square miles (1.8 km^{2}), or 1.49%, is water. Among the many waterways are the Salmon River, Jeremy River, and Dickinson Creek, which is spanned by the Lyman Viaduct. It is approximately halfway between Hartford (25 miles away) and New London (28 miles away).

=== Principal communities ===
- Colchester center
- Golden Hill Paugussett Reservation
- North Westchester
- Westchester

=== Climate ===
This climatic region is typified by large seasonal temperature differences, with warm to hot (and often humid) summers and cold (sometimes severely cold) winters. According to the Köppen Climate Classification system, Colchester has a humid continental climate, abbreviated "Dfb" on climate maps.

== Ecology ==
The Town is home to a wide array of different types of flora and fauna. According to the United States Environmental Protection Agency, Colchester is located within the Southern New England Coastal Plains and Hills Ecoregion. This region is described as irregular and hilly and was heavily shaped by glaciation. Before colonization, the forest cover was a mix of American Chestnut, Eastern Hemlock, and Eastern White Pine. However, as the English settled, nearly all forests in the area were cleared for agricultural use. As the turn of the 20th Century came and went, much of this farmland either was developed in a suburban style or has since reverted to forests.

== Activities ==
The Salmon River State Forest provides opportunities for fishing, hiking, and hunting. The town is also home to Day Pond State Park.

=== Landmarks ===
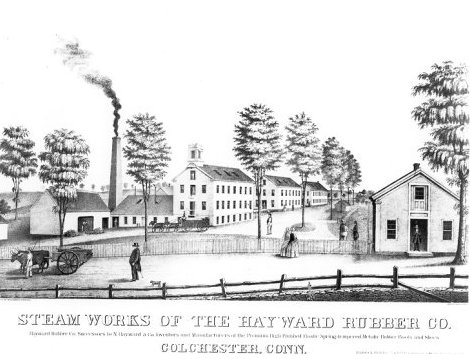
Print made about 1848–1849 by Kelloggs & Comstock

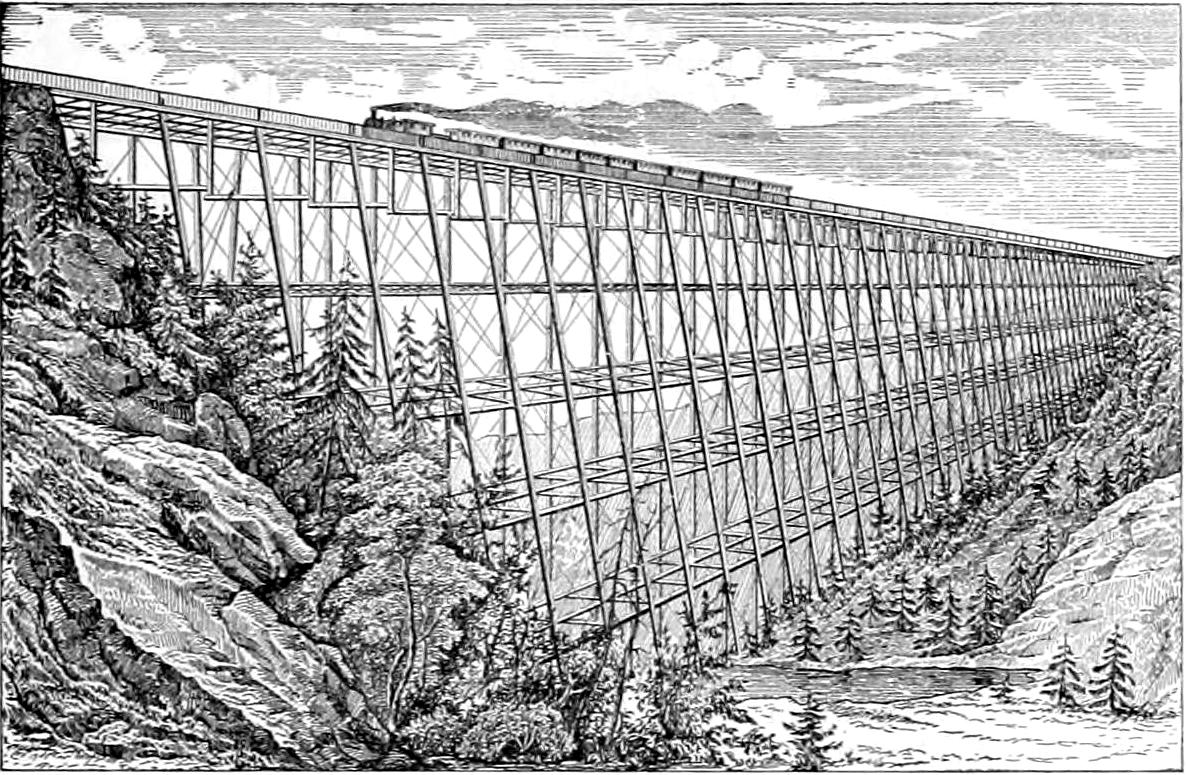
Lyman Viaduct on the Air-Line Railroad

Formerly an incorporated borough, the town center of Colchester is listed on the National Register of Historic Places as a historic district, known as the Colchester Village Historic District. The walkable center includes a town green with a veterans' memorial. Retail stores and restaurants are located here.

== Schools ==
Colchester has four schools: Colchester Elementary School (Pre K-2), Jack Jackter Intermediate School (Grades 3–5), William J. Johnston Middle School (Grades 6–8), Bacon Academy (Grades 9–12).

== Demographics ==
Historical population
Census	Pop.	Note	%±
1800	3,163		—
1820	2,152		—
1850	2,468		—
1860	2,862		16.0%
1870	3,383		18.2%
1880	2,974		−12.1%
1890	2,988		0.5%
1900	1,991		−33.4%
1910	2,140		7.5%
1920	2,050		−4.2%
1930	2,134		4.1%
1940	2,338		9.6%
1950	3,007		28.6%
1960	4,648		54.6%
1970	6,603		42.1%
1980	7,761		17.5%
1990	10,980		41.5%
2000	14,551		32.5%
2010	16,068		10.4%
2020	15,555		−3.2%
U.S. Decennial Census

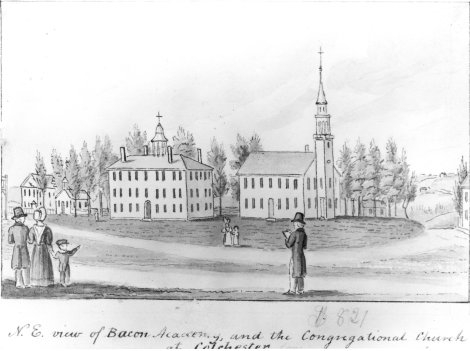
The Colchester Congregational Church, Bacon Academy, and, to the right of the church beneath the trees, a small "school for colored children." Sketch by John Warner Barber for his Historical Collections of Connecticut (published in 1836)

=== Population ===
Population, 2020-2022
Category	Date	Statistic
Population Estimates	July 1, 2022	15,572
Population estimates base	April 1, 2020	15,547
Population, percent change	April 1, 2020- July 1, 2022	+0.2%

Age and Sex, 2020
Category	Statistic
Persons under 5 years, percent	7.9%
Persons under 18 years, percent	23.6%
Persons 65 years and over, percent	16.9%
Female persons, percent	49.2%

Race & Hispanic Origin, 2020
Category	Statistic
White alone, percent	92.3%
Two or More Races, percent	3.0%
Black or African American alone, percent	2.2%
Asian alone, percent	1.3%
American Indian and Alaska Native alone, percent	0.0%
Native Hawai'ian and Other Pacific Islander alone, percent	0.0%
Hispanic or Latino, percent	3.0%
White alone, not Hispanic or Latino, percent	90.9%

Population Characteristics, 2018-2022
Category	Statistic
Veterans	997
Foreign born persons, percent	5.0%

Housing, 2018-2022
Category	Statistic
Owner-occupied housing unit rate	80%
Median value of owner-occupied housing units	$315,500
Median selected monthly owner costs -with a mortgage	$2,233
Median selected monthly owner costs -without a mortgage	$925
Median gross rent	$1,276

Families & Living Arrangements, 2018-2022
Category	Statistic
Households	6,089
Persons per household	2.52
Living in the same house 1 year ago, percent of persons age 1 year+	88.7%
Language other than English spoken at home, percent of persons age 5 years+	5.5%

Computer and Internet Use, 2018-2022
Category	Statistic
Households with a computer, percent	93.8%
Households with a broadband Internet subscription, percent	92.3%

Education, 2018-2022, age 25 years+
Category	Statistic
High school graduate or higher	95.9%
Bachelor's degree or higher	45.8%

Health, people under age 65 years
Category	Timeframe	Statistic
Persons with a disability	2018-2022	6.5%
Persons without health insurance	2020	1.1%

In Civilian Labor Force, 2018-2022
Category	Statistic
Total percent of population age 16+	69.3%
Female percent of population age 16+	64.7%

Transportation, 2018-2022
Category	Statistic
Mean travel time to work, workers age 16 years+	32.4 minutes

Income & Poverty
Category	Timeframe	Statistic
Median household income (in 2022 dollars)	2018-2022	$114,505
Per capita income in past 12 months (in 2022 dollars)	2018-2022	$52,273
Persons in poverty, percent	2020	4.6%

As of the 2000 census the population density was 296.6 inhabitants per square mile (114.5/km^{2}) and 5,407 housing units at an average density of 110.2 per square mile (42.5/km^{2}).

There were 5,247 households as of 2000, out of which 43.0% had children under the age of 18 living with them, 63.9% were married couples living together, 9.2% had a female householder with no husband present, and 23.5% were non-families. 18.2% of all households were made up of individuals, and 5.9% had someone living alone who was 65 years of age or older. The average household size was 2.75 and the average family size was 3.14.

In the town in 2000, the population was spread out, with 29.8% under the age of 18, 4.8% from 18 to 24, 36.5% from 25 to 44, 19.7% from 45 to 64, and 9.2% who were 65 years of age or older. The median age was 35 years. For every 100 females, there were 94.4 males. For every 100 females age 18 and over, there were 92.3 males.

The median income for a household in the town was $64,807, and the median income for a family was $62,346. Males had a median income of $47,123 versus $29,250 for females. The per capita income for the town was $24,038. About 6.1% of families and 2.7% of the population were below the poverty line, including 1.6% of those under age 18 and 4.5% of those age 65 or over.

Voter Registration and Party Enrollment as of October 29, 2019
Party	Active Voters	Inactive Voters	Total Voters	Percentage
Democratic	3,180	411	3,591	29.90%
Republican	2,529	293	2,822	23.50%
Unaffiliated	4,454	933	5,387	44.85%
Minor parties	194	16	210	1.75%
Total	10,357	1,653	12,010	100%

Presidential Election Results
Year	Democratic	Republican	Third Parties
2020	53.8% 5,216	43.8% 4,243	2.4% 232
2016	45.5% 3,898	48.0% 4,108	6.5% 550
2012	52.6% 4,125	45.6% 3,579	1.8% 144
2008	57.3% 4,712	40.8% 3,355	1.9% 152
2004	53.5% 4,081	44.8% 3,418	1.7% 134
2000	57.9% 3,845	36.9% 2,454	5.2% 347
1996	51.5% 3,094	29.5% 1,774	19.0% 1,136
1992	39.4% 2,508	28.2% 1,796	32.4% 2,062
1988	49.6% 2,488	49.4% 2,478	1.0% 49
1984	39.6% 1,720	60.0% 2,603	0.4% 15
1980	40.8% 1,543	43.1% 1,630	16.1% 607
1976	55.2% 1,867	44.1% 1,491	0.7% 26
1972	47.1% 1,464	51.8% 1,610	1.1% 33
1968	57.7% 1,467	34.9% 887	7.4% 188
1964	74.2% 1,704	25.8% 591	0.00% 0
1960	61.5% 1,363	38.5% 854	0.00% 0
1956	53.4% 925	46.6% 806	0.00% 0

== Notable people ==
- Myron Abell (1864-1940), State representative
- John Adams (1772–1863), founder of Phillips Exeter Academy, was the principal of the Bacon Academy here from 1803 to 1810
- William Adams (1807–1880), born in Colchester, noted clergyman and president of Union Theological Seminary (New York)
- Stephen F. Austin (1793–1836), "Father of Texas", attended Bacon Academy in 1803
- Edward Sheffield Bartholomew (1822–1858), sculptor
- Jehiel C. Beman (1791–1858) African-American 19th-century minister and abolitionist; born in Colchester
- Eliphalet Adams Bulkeley (1803–1872), Bacon Academy graduate (1819), state senator, state's attorney and founder of Aetna Insurance Company (1846)
- Jonathan Coulton (born 1970), singer-songwriter, whose first EP Where Tradition Meets Tomorrow is named after Colchester's town motto
- John B. Day (1847-1925), tobacco merchant and first owner of the New York Giants baseball team
- Rick Derringer (born 1947), rock artist and producer
- Henry C. Deming (1815–1872), mayor of Hartford, mayor of New Orleans, colonel in the Union Army and U.S. congressman
- Alfred Ely (1815–1892), US congressman of New York and taken prisoner after the First Battle of Bull Run
- Ezra Hall Gillett (1823–1875), author, clergyman, and professor
- Nathaniel Hayward (1808–1865), Inventor, Business Owner
- Prince Saunders (1775–1839), attorney general of the Republic of Haiti
- Lyman Trumbull (1813–1896), born in Colchester, Bacon Academy graduate (1829), became influential as a U.S. senator representing the state of Illinois during the Civil War and Reconstruction
- Abigail Goodrich Whittelsey (1788–1858), editor
- Denison Worthington (1806–1880), Wisconsin state senator
- Ron Wotus (born 1961), Bacon Academy graduate (1979), San Francisco Giants bench coach
- Tokyo's Revenge (born 1998) Hip Hop Artist
