= List of bridges documented by the Historic American Engineering Record in Connecticut =

This is a list of bridges documented by the Historic American Engineering Record in the U.S. state of Connecticut.

== Bridges ==
Survey No.	Name (as assigned by HAER)	Status	Type	Built	Documented	Carries	Crosses	Location	County	Coordinates
CT-4	Indian Leap Pedestrian Bridge	Replaced	Warren truss	1904	1979		Yantic River	Norwich	New London	41°32′2″N 72°05′24″W
CT-5	Beachside Avenue Bridge	Replaced	Warren truss	1891	1980	Beachside Avenue	Amtrak Northeast Corridor	Westport	Fairfield	41°07′15″N 73°19′10″W
CT-7	Double Intersection Warren Truss Bridge	Extant	Warren truss	1907	1983	New York, New Haven and Hartford Railroad (former)	Blackledge River	Colchester	New London	41°34′56″N 72°25′21″W
CT-13	Riverside Avenue Bridge	Extant	Pratt truss	1871	1985	Riverside Avenue	Amtrak Northeast Corridor	Greenwich	Fairfield	41°01′54″N 73°35′17″W
CT-15	Grasmere Avenue Bridge	Replaced	Warren truss		1983	Grasmere Avenue	Amtrak Northeast Corridor	Fairfield	Fairfield	41°09′22″N 73°14′28″W
CT-16	Boardman's Lenticular Bridge	Extant	Lenticular truss	1888	1985	Boardman's Road	Housatonic River	New Milford	Litchfield	41°35′36″N 73°27′00″W
CT-17	Lover's Leap Lenticular Bridge	Extant	Lenticular truss	1895	1985	Pumpkin Hill Road	Housatonic River	New Milford	Litchfield	41°32′39″N 73°24′25″W
CT-18	Washington Avenue Lenticular Truss Bridge	Extant	Lenticular truss	1880	1985	Washington Avenue	Mad River	Waterbury	New Haven	41°32′39″N 73°02′16″W
CT-20	Toelles Road Bridge	Replaced	Warren truss	1898	1985	Toelles Road	Quinnipiac River	Wallingford and North Haven	New Haven	41°25′58″N 72°51′03″W
CT-22	Niantic River Swing Bridge	Replaced	Swing span	1921	1987	Route 156	Niantic River	East Lyme and Waterford	New London	41°19′26″N 72°10′35″W
CT-24	New York, New Haven & Hartford Railroad, Shaw's Cove Bridge	Replaced	Swing span	1913	1983	Amtrak Northeast Corridor	Shaw's Cove	New London	New London	41°20′57″N 72°05′49″W
CT-25	New York, New Haven & Hartford Railroad, Groton Bridge	Replaced	Strauss bascule	1919	1983	Amtrak Northeast Corridor	Thames River	New London and Groton	New London	41°21′47″N 72°05′15″W
CT-26	New York, New Haven & Hartford Railroad, Mystic River Bridge	Replaced	Swing span	1919	1983	Amtrak Northeast Corridor	Mystic River	Groton and Stonington	New London	41°20′56″N 71°58′13″W
CT-27	New York, New Haven & Hartford Railroad, Niantic Bridge	Replaced	Rolling lift (Scherzer) bascule	1907	1983	Amtrak Northeast Corridor	Niantic River	East Lyme and Waterford	New London	41°19′22″N 72°10′37″W
CT-29	Water Street Bridge	Replaced	Baltimore truss	1894	1987	US 1	Metro-North Railroad	New Haven	New Haven	41°18′05″N 72°55′24″W
CT-30	Patch Street Bridge	Replaced	Stone arch	1885	1986	Patch Street	Kohanza Brook	Danbury	Fairfield	41°24′09″N 73°27′23″W
CT-31	Palisado Avenue Bridge	Replaced	Pratt truss	1916	1988	Palisado Avenue	Farmington River	Windsor	Hartford	41°51′25″N 72°38′18″W
CT-32	Gaylordsville Bridge	Replaced	Parker truss	1926	1988	US 7	Housatonic River	New Milford	Litchfield	41°38′51″N 73°29′02″W
CT-33	Bog Hollow Bridge	Replaced	Parker truss	1923	1988	Route 341	Housatonic River	Kent	Litchfield	41°43′36″N 73°28′52″W
CT-34	Bridge Street Bridge	Replaced	Pratt truss	1921	1988	Route 140	Connecticut River	Windsor Locks and East Windsor	Hartford	41°55′45″N 72°37′27″W
CT-35	Frost Bridge Road Bridge	Replaced	Pratt truss	1922	1988	Route 262	Naugatuck River	Thomaston and Watertown	Litchfield	41°36′56″N 73°03′29″W
CT-38	Merritt Parkway, Lapham Avenue Bridge	Replaced	Reinforced concrete rigid frame	1937	1987	Lapham Road	Route 15 / Merritt Parkway	New Canaan	Fairfield	41°07′00″N 73°29′37″W
CT-39	Merritt Parkway, Wilton Road Bridge	Replaced	Reinforced concrete T-beam	1938	1987	Route 33 (Wilton Road)	Route 15 / Merritt Parkway	Westport	Fairfield	41°09′50″N 73°22′33″W
CT-40	Tariffville Road Bridge	Replaced	Parker truss	1894	1991	Route 315	Farmington River	Simsbury	Hartford	41°53′41″N 72°47′03″W
CT-42	Chapel Street Swing Bridge	Replaced	Swing span	1899	1988	Chapel Street	Mill River	New Haven	New Haven	41°18′13″N 72°54′20″W
CT-45	West Main Street Bridge	Replaced	Steel built-up girder	1928	1989	West Main Street	Wepawaug River	Milford	New Haven	41°13′35″N 73°03′30″W
CT-46	Saugatuck River Bridge	Extant	Swing span	1884	1991	Route 136	Saugatuck River	Westport	Fairfield	41°07′22″N 73°22′10″W
CT-47	Bridge No. 110	Rehabilitated	Warren truss	1896	1990	Metro-North Railroad	Wepawaug River	Milford	New Haven	41°13′25″N 73°03′20″W
CT-48	Bridge No. 475	Replaced	Warren truss	1927	1990	US 6	Pequabuck River	Farmington	Hartford	41°42′16″N 72°51′01″W
CT-49	Walnut Street Railroad Bridge	Replaced	Warren truss	1907	1991	Walnut Street	Amtrak	Hartford	Hartford	41°46′20″N 72°40′50″W
CT-51	Bridge Street Bridge	Replaced	Warren truss	1894	1991	Bridge Street	Metro-North Railroad	Norwalk	Fairfield	41°06′27″N 73°23′45″W
CT-54	Ferry Street Railroad Bridge	Extant	Warren truss	1912	1991	Ferry Street	Metro-North Railroad	New Haven	New Haven	41°19′08″N 72°53′53″W
CT-55	Merritt Parkway, Bridge No. 744	Reconstructed	Reinforced concrete rigid frame	1936	1991	Route 59 (Easton Turnpike)	Route 15 / Merritt Parkway	Fairfield	Fairfield	41°13′15″N 73°15′16″W
CT-56	Merritt Parkway, Rocky Hill Road Bridge	Demolished	Steel built-up girder	1935	1991	Rocky Hill Road	Route 15 / Merritt Parkway	Trumbull	Fairfield	
CT-57	Merritt Parkway, Pequonnock River Bridge	Replaced	Reinforced concrete girder	1935	1991	Route 15 / Merritt Parkway	Pequonnock River	Trumbull	Fairfield	41°14′11″N 73°11′09″W
CT-58	Olive Street Railroad Bridge	Replaced	Warren truss	1907	1991	Olive Street	Amtrak Northeast Corridor	New Haven	New Haven	41°18′32″N 72°55′08″W
CT-61	Tomlinson Bridge	Replaced	Simple trunnion bascule	1924	1993	US 1	Quinnipiac River	New Haven	New Haven	41°17′54″N 72°54′19″W
CT-64	Merritt Parkway, West Branch Byram River Bridge	Reconstructed	Reinforced concrete T-beam	1934	1992	Route 15 / Merritt Parkway	Byram River	Greenwich	Fairfield	41°03′32″N 73°40′31″W
CT-65	Merritt Parkway, Riversville Road (East Branch) Bridge	Replaced	Steel rolled multi-beam	1935	1992	Route 15 / Merritt Parkway	Riversville Road and East Branch of Byram River	Greenwich	Fairfield	41°03′40″N 73°40′29″W
CT-66	Merritt Parkway, Glenville Water Company & Brook Bridge	Extant	Reinforced concrete rigid frame	1935	1992	Route 15 / Merritt Parkway	Glenville Water Company Road and brook	Greenwich	Fairfield	41°04′04″N 73°40′13″W
CT-67	Merritt Parkway, East Branch Byram River Bridge	Extant	Reinforced concrete cast-in-place slab	1935	1992	Route 15 / Merritt Parkway	Converse Pond Brook	Greenwich	Fairfield	41°04′31″N 73°40′10″W
CT-68	Merritt Parkway, Round Hill Road Bridge	Extant	Reinforced concrete rigid frame	1935	1992	Round Hill Road	Route 15 / Merritt Parkway	Greenwich	Fairfield	41°05′02″N 73°39′55″W
CT-69	Merritt Parkway, Lake Avenue Bridge	Extant	Steel rigid frame	1970	1992	Lake Avenue	Route 15 / Merritt Parkway	Greenwich	Fairfield	41°05′44″N 73°38′55″W
CT-70	Merritt Parkway, North Street Bridge	Reconstructed	Reinforced concrete rigid frame	1937	1992	North Street	Route 15 / Merritt Parkway	Greenwich	Fairfield	41°05′40″N 73°37′57″W
CT-71	Merritt Parkway, Taconic Road Bridge	Extant	Reinforced concrete closed-spandrel arch	1937	1992	Route 15 / Merritt Parkway	Taconic Road	Greenwich	Fairfield	41°05′24″N 73°37′20″W
CT-72	Merritt Parkway, Stanwich Road Bridge	Reconstructed	Reinforced concrete rigid frame	1937	1992	Stanwich Road	Route 15 / Merritt Parkway	Greenwich	Fairfield	41°05′50″N 73°36′13″W
CT-73	Merritt Parkway, Guinea Road Bridge	Extant	Reinforced concrete closed-spandrel arch	1934	1992	Guinea Road	Route 15 / Merritt Parkway	Stamford	Fairfield	41°06′03″N 73°35′32″W
CT-74	Merritt Parkway, Mianus River Culvert	Extant	Culvert	1937	1992	Route 15 / Merritt Parkway	Mianus River	Stamford	Fairfield	41°06′02″N 73°35′19″W
CT-75	Merritt Parkway, Riverbank Road Bridge	Extant	Reinforced concrete rigid frame	1937	1992	Riverbank Road	Route 15 / Merritt Parkway	Stamford	Fairfield	41°06′02″N 73°34′56″W
CT-76	Merritt Parkway, Long Ridge Road/Route 104 Bridge	Extant	Reinforced concrete rigid frame	1936	1992	Route 15 / Merritt Parkway	Route 104 (Long Ridge Road)	Stamford	Fairfield	41°06′11″N 73°33′58″W
CT-77	Merritt Parkway, Wire Mill Road Bridge	Extant	Reinforced concrete rigid frame	1938	1992	Wire Mill Road	Route 15 / Merritt Parkway	Stamford	Fairfield	41°06′23″N 73°33′33″W
CT-78	Merritt Parkway, Rippowam River Bridge	Extant	Reinforced concrete closed-spandrel arch	1936	1992	Route 15 / Merritt Parkway	Rippowam River	Stamford	Fairfield	41°06′30″N 73°33′20″W
CT-79	Merritt Parkway, High Ridge Road/Route 137 Bridge	Reconstructed	Steel rigid frame	1937	1992	Route 15 / Merritt Parkway	Route 137 (High Ridge Road)	Stamford	Fairfield	41°06′43″N 73°32′47″W
CT-80	Merritt Parkway, Newfield Avenue Bridge	Reconstructed	Reinforced concrete rigid frame	1937	1992	Newfield Avenue	Route 15 / Merritt Parkway	Stamford	Fairfield	41°06′59″N 73°32′07″W
CT-81	Merritt Parkway, Ponus Ridge Road Bridge	Extant	Reinforced concrete rigid frame	1937	1992	Ponus Ridge Road	Route 15 / Merritt Parkway	New Canaan	Fairfield	41°07′08″N 73°31′03″W
CT-82	Merritt Parkway, Old Stamford Road/Route 106 Bridge	Reconstructed	Reinforced concrete rigid frame	1939	1992	Route 15 / Merritt Parkway	Route 106 (Old Stamford Road)	New Canaan	Fairfield	41°07′02″N 73°29′57″W
CT-83	Merritt Parkway, Metro North Railroad Bridge	Extant	Reinforced concrete rigid frame	1937	1992	Metro-North Railroad	Route 15 / Merritt Parkway	New Canaan	Fairfield	41°07′01″N 73°29′53″W
CT-84	Merritt Parkway, South Avenue/Route 124 Bridge	Reconstructed	Reinforced concrete rigid frame	1937	1992	Route 124 (South Avenue)	Route 15 / Merritt Parkway	New Canaan	Fairfield	41°07′09″N 73°28′59″W
CT-85	Merritt Parkway, White Oak Shade Road Bridge	Reconstructed	Reinforced concrete rigid frame	1937	1992	White Oak Shade Road	Route 15 / Merritt Parkway	New Canaan	Fairfield	41°07′24″N 73°28′25″W
CT-86	Merritt Parkway, Marvin River Road Bridge	Replaced	Reinforced concrete rigid frame	1937	1992	Marvin Ridge Road	Route 15 / Merritt Parkway	New Canaan	Fairfield	41°07′38″N 73°28′03″W
CT-87	Merritt Parkway, New Canaan Road/Route 123 Bridge	Reconstructed	Steel rigid frame	1937	1992	Route 15 / Merritt Parkway	Route 123 (New Canaan Road)	Norwalk	Fairfield	41°08′01″N 73°27′24″W
CT-88	Merritt Parkway, Comstock Hill Road Bridge	Reconstructed	Reinforced concrete rigid frame	1938	1992	Comstock Hill Avenue	Route 15 / Merritt Parkway	Norwalk	Fairfield	41°08′15″N 73°26′42″W
CT-89	Merritt Parkway, Silvermine Avenue Bridge	Extant	Reinforced concrete rigid frame	1938	1992	Route 15 / Merritt Parkway	Silvermine Avenue	Norwalk	Fairfield	41°08′19″N 73°26′27″W
CT-90	Merritt Parkway, Perry Avenue Bridge	Extant	Reinforced concrete rigid frame	1936	1992	Route 15 / Merritt Parkway	Perry Avenue	Norwalk	Fairfield	41°08′26″N 73°26′03″W
CT-91	Merritt Parkway, Metro North Railroad Bridge	Extant	Reinforced concrete rigid frame	1937	1992	Route 15 / Merritt Parkway	Metro-North Railroad	Norwalk	Fairfield	41°08′32″N 73°25′41″W
CT-92	Merritt Parkway, Norwalk River Bridge	Reconstructed	Reinforced concrete closed-spandrel arch	1938	1992	Route 15 / Merritt Parkway	Norwalk River	Norwalk	Fairfield	41°08′33″N 73°25′37″W
CT-93	Merritt Parkway, Main Avenue/Route 7 Bridge	Extant	Reinforced concrete rigid frame	1937	1992	Route 15 / Merritt Parkway	SR 719 (Main Avenue)	Norwalk	Fairfield	41°08′33″N 73°25′33″W
CT-94	Merritt Parkway, West Rocks Road Bridge	Reconstructed	Steel rigid frame	1938	1992	West Rocks Road	Route 15 / Merritt Parkway	Norwalk	Fairfield	41°08′44″N 73°25′03″W
CT-95	Merritt Parkway, East Rocks Road Bridge	Extant	Reinforced concrete rigid frame	1938	1992	East Rocks Road	Route 15 / Merritt Parkway	Norwalk	Fairfield	41°08′56″N 73°24′41″W
CT-96	Merritt Parkway, Grumman Avenue Bridge	Reconstructed	Reinforced concrete rigid frame	1938	1992	Grumman Avenue	Route 15 / Merritt Parkway	Norwalk	Fairfield	41°09′12″N 73°24′14″W
CT-97	Merritt Parkway, Chestnut Hill Road/Route 53 Bridge	Extant	Reinforced concrete rigid frame	1938	1992	Route 15 / Merritt Parkway	Route 53 (Chestnut Hill Road)	Norwalk	Fairfield	41°09′31″N 73°23′41″W
CT-98	Merritt Parkway, Newton Turnpike Bridge	Extant	Reinforced concrete rigid frame	1939	1992	Newton Turnpike	Route 15 / Merritt Parkway	Westport	Fairfield	41°09′48″N 73°23′00″W
CT-99	Merritt Parkway, Saugatuck River Bridge	Reconstructed	Steel arch	1938	1992	Route 15 / Merritt Parkway	Saugatuck River	Westport	Fairfield	41°09′49″N 73°22′02″W
CT-100	Merritt Parkway, Clinton Avenue/North Clinton Avenue Bridge	Extant	Steel rigid frame	1940	1992	Clinton Avenue	Route 15 / Merritt Parkway	Westport	Fairfield	41°09′48″N 73°21′48″W
CT-101	Merritt Parkway, Weston Road/Route 57 Bridge	Reconstructed	Reinforced concrete rigid frame	1938	1992	Route 15 / Merritt Parkway	Route 57 (Weston Road)	Westport	Fairfield	41°09′50″N 73°21′29″W
CT-102	Merritt Parkway, Easton Road/Route 136 Bridge	Reconstructed	Steel rigid frame	1938	1992	Route 15 / Merritt Parkway	Route 136 (Easton Road)	Westport	Fairfield	41°09′54″N 73°21′17″W
CT-103	Merritt Parkway, North Avenue Bridge	Extant	Reinforced concrete rigid frame	1939	1992	North Avenue	Route 15 / Merritt Parkway	Westport	Fairfield	41°10′07″N 73°20′32″W
CT-104	Merritt Parkway, Bayberry Lane Bridge	Extant	Reinforced concrete rigid frame	1939	1992	Route 15 / Merritt Parkway	Bayberry Lane	Westport	Fairfield	41°10′18″N 73°19′52″W
CT-105	Merritt Parkway, Cross Highway Bridge	Extant	Reinforced concrete closed-spandrel arch	1938	1992	Route 15 / Merritt Parkway	Cross Highway	Fairfield	Fairfield	41°10′27″N 73°19′19″W
CT-106	Merritt Parkway, Merwins Lane Bridge	Extant	Reinforced concrete rigid frame	1940	1992	Merwins Lane	Route 15 / Merritt Parkway	Fairfield	Fairfield	41°10′49″N 73°18′46″W
CT-107	Merritt Parkway, Redding Road Bridge	Extant	Reinforced concrete rigid frame	1939	1992	Redding Road	Route 15 / Merritt Parkway	Fairfield	Fairfield	41°11′07″N 73°18′25″W
CT-108	Merritt Parkway, Congress Street Bridge	Extant	Reinforced concrete rigid frame	1938	1992	Congress Street	Route 15 / Merritt Parkway	Fairfield	Fairfield	41°11′25″N 73°17′58″W
CT-109	Merritt Parkway, Hillside Road Bridge	Extant	Reinforced concrete rigid frame	1940	1992	Route 15 / Merritt Parkway	Hillside Road	Fairfield	Fairfield	41°11′29″N 73°17′43″W
CT-110	Merritt Parkway, Burr Street Bridge	Reconstructed	Reinforced concrete rigid frame	1939	1992	Burr Street	Route 15 / Merritt Parkway	Fairfield	Fairfield	41°11′39″N 73°17′09″W
CT-111	Merritt Parkway, Black Rock Turnpike/Route 58 Bridge	Extant	Reinforced concrete rigid frame	1938	1992	Route 15 / Merritt Parkway	Route 58 (Black Rock Turnpike)	Fairfield	Fairfield	41°12′10″N 73°16′13″W
CT-112	Merritt Parkway, Cricker Brook Culvert	Extant	Culvert	1940	1992	Route 15 / Merritt Parkway	Cricker Brook	Fairfield	Fairfield	41°12′13″N 73°16′12″W
CT-113	Merritt Parkway, Morehouse Drive Bridge	Extant	Reinforced concrete rigid frame	1939	1992	Morehouse Drive	Route 15 / Merritt Parkway	Fairfield	Fairfield	41°12′40″N 73°15′44″W
CT-114	Merritt Parkway, Mill River Bridge	Extant	Reinforced concrete rigid frame	1940	1992	Route 15 / Merritt Parkway	Mill River	Fairfield	Fairfield	41°12′53″N 73°15′34″W
CT-115	Merritt Parkway, Park Avenue Bridge	Extant	Reinforced concrete closed-spandrel arch	1940	1992	Park Avenue	Route 15 / Merritt Parkway	Trumbull	Fairfield	41°13′41″N 73°14′44″W
CT-116	Merritt Parkway, Plattsville Road Bridge	Extant	Reinforced concrete rigid frame	1939	1992	Plattsville Road	Route 15 / Merritt Parkway	Trumbull	Fairfield	41°13′47″N 73°14′20″W
CT-117	Merritt Parkway, Madison Avenue Bridge	Extant	Reinforced concrete rigid frame	1939	1992	Madison Avenue	Route 15 / Merritt Parkway	Trumbull	Fairfield	41°13′54″N 73°13′56″W
CT-118	Merritt Parkway, Main Street/Route 25 Bridge	Reconstructed	Reinforced concrete rigid frame	1936	1992	Route 111 (Main Street)	Route 15 / Merritt Parkway	Trumbull	Fairfield	41°13′56″N 73°13′13″W
CT-119	Merritt Parkway, Frenchtown Road Bridge	Extant	Reinforced concrete rigid frame	1942	1992	Frenchtown Road	Route 15 / Merritt Parkway	Trumbull	Fairfield	41°13′55″N 73°12′42″W
CT-120	Merritt Parkway, Reservoir Road Bridge	Extant	Reinforced concrete rigid frame	1939	1992	Route 15 / Merritt Parkway	Reservoir Avenue	Trumbull	Fairfield	41°14′06″N 73°11′45″W
CT-121	Merritt Parkway, Silvermine River Bridge	Extant	Reinforced concrete closed-spandrel arch	1957	1992	Route 15 / Merritt Parkway	Silvermine River	Norwalk	Fairfield	41°08′20″N 73°26′25″W
CT-122	Merritt Parkway, White Plains Road/Route 127 Bridge	Reconstructed	Steel built-up girder	1934	1992	Route 15 / Merritt Parkway	Route 127 (White Plains Road)	Trumbull	Fairfield	41°14′14″N 73°10′46″W
CT-123	Merritt Parkway, Unity Road Bridge	Reconstructed	Steel rigid frame	1940	1992	Route 15 / Merritt Parkway	Unity Road	Trumbull	Fairfield	41°14′13″N 73°10′27″W
CT-124	Merritt Parkway, Huntington Turnpike/Route 108 Bridge	Replaced	Reinforced concrete rigid frame	1940	1992	Route 108 (Huntington Turnpike)	Route 15 / Merritt Parkway	Trumbull	Fairfield	41°14′16″N 73°09′41″W
CT-125	Merritt Parkway, Nichols-Shelton Road Bridge	Demolished	Reinforced concrete closed-spandrel arch	1940	1992	Nichols-Shelton Road	Route 15 / Merritt Parkway	Trumbull	Fairfield	41°14′14″N 73°09′09″W
CT-126	Merritt Parkway, Huntington Road Bridge	Extant	Reinforced concrete rigid frame	1940	1992	Route 15 / Merritt Parkway	Huntington Road	Stratford	Fairfield	41°14′14″N 73°08′24″W
CT-127	Merritt Parkway, Cutspring Road Bridge	Extant	Reinforced concrete rigid frame	1940	1992	Route 15 / Merritt Parkway	Cutspring Road	Stratford	Fairfield	41°14′17″N 73°07′50″W
CT-128	Merritt Parkway, Pumpkin Brook Culvert	Extant	Culvert	1941	1992	Route 15 / Merritt Parkway	Pumpkin Brook	Stratford	Fairfield	41°14′20″N 73°07′35″W
CT-129	Merritt Parkway, James Farm Road Bridge	Extant	Reinforced concrete rigid frame	1940	1992	James Farm Road	Route 15 / Merritt Parkway	Stratford	Fairfield	41°14′28″N 73°07′03″W
CT-130	Merritt Parkway, Main Street/Route 110 Bridge	Reconstructed	Steel rigid frame	1940	1992	Route 15 / Merritt Parkway	Route 110 (Main Street)	Stratford	Fairfield	41°14′43″N 73°06′09″W
CT-146	Yellow Mill Bridge	Rehabilitated	Simple trunnion bascule	1929	1995	Route 130 (Stratford Avenue)	Yellow Mill Channel	Bridgeport	Fairfield	41°10′36″N 73°10′35″W
CT-148	Grand Street Bridge	Demolished	Simple trunnion bascule	1919	1995	Grand Street	Pequonnock River	Bridgeport	Fairfield	41°11′23″N 73°11′21″W
CT-149	Mount Hope Road Bridge	Replaced	Warren truss		1994	Mount Hope Road	Mount Hope River	Mansfield Center	Tolland	41°49′27″N 72°10′17″W
CT-150	Perkins Corner Bridge	Replaced	Warren truss	1914	1994	Flanders and Cider Mill roads	Willimantic River	Coventry and Mansfield	Tolland	41°44′19″N 72°15′44″W
CT-154	East Washington Avenue Bridge	Replaced	Simple trunnion bascule	1925	1995	East Washington Avenue	Pequonnock River	Bridgeport	Fairfield	41°11′10″N 73°11′20″W
CT-156	Black Bridge	Replaced	Warren truss	1936	1995	Black Bridge Road	Farmington River	New Hartford	Litchfield	41°52′41″N 72°57′53″W
CT-158	Depot Road Bridge	Replaced	Stone arch	1835	1995	Depot Road	Mill Brook	Coventry	Tolland	41°45′44″N 72°16′19″W
CT-161	Sharon Station Road Bridge	Reconstructed	Lenticular truss	1885	1996	Sharon Station Road	Webatuck Creek	Sharon	Litchfield	41°53′05″N 73°29′38″W
CT-162	Bridge No. 1132	Extant	Reinforced concrete open-spandrel arch	1934	1996	Route 80	Hammonasset River	Madison and Killingworth	New Haven and Middlesex	41°21′26″N 72°36′45″W
CT-165	Rocky Neck Park Trail Bridge	Extant	Steel arch	1934	1996	Trail	New York, New Haven and Hartford Railroad (former)	Old Lyme	New London	41°17′59″N 72°14′44″W
CT-166	Windham Road Bridge	Replaced	Stone arch	1857	1996	Windham Road	Willimantic River	Windham	Windham	41°42′34″N 72°12′23″W
CT-167	Singing Bridge	Replaced	Pratt truss	1925	1997	US 1	Patchogue River	Westbrook	Middlesex	41°16′40″N 72°28′03″W
CT-168	South Norwalk Railroad Bridge	Extant	Pratt truss	1896	1998	Metro-North Railroad	South Main and Washington streets	Norwalk	Fairfield	41°05′56″N 73°25′08″W
CT-174	Mystic River Bridge	Extant	Strauss bascule	1922	1996	US 1 (Main Street)	Mystic River	Groton and Stonington	New London	41°21′17″N 71°58′07″W
CT-176	Bridge No. 04619	Rehabilitated	Stone arch	1909	1997	Village Hill Road	Ten Mile River	Columbia and Lebanon	Tolland	41°42′01″N 72°15′17″W
CT-177	Bridge No. 00761	Replaced	Steel built-up girder	1939	1998	Route 15 / Merritt Parkway	Housatonic River	Milford and Stratford	New Haven and Fairfield	41°14′47″N 73°05′29″W
CT-179	River Street Bridge	Replaced	Lenticular truss	1886	1998	River Street	Moosup River	Plainfield	Windham	41°42′53″N 71°52′45″W
CT-184	Shetucket River Deck-Truss Bridge	Rehabilitated	Pratt truss	1938	1991	Route 169	Shetucket River	Norwich	New London	41°33′59″N 72°02′41″W
CT-192	Turn-of-River Bridge	Extant	Lenticular truss	1893	2013	Old North Stamford Road	Rippowam River	Stamford	Fairfield	41°06′47″N 73°32′43″W

== See also ==
- List of bridges of the Merritt Parkway
- List of bridges on the National Register of Historic Places in Connecticut
- List of movable bridges in Connecticut
