= Rigid-frame bridge =

Type of bridge

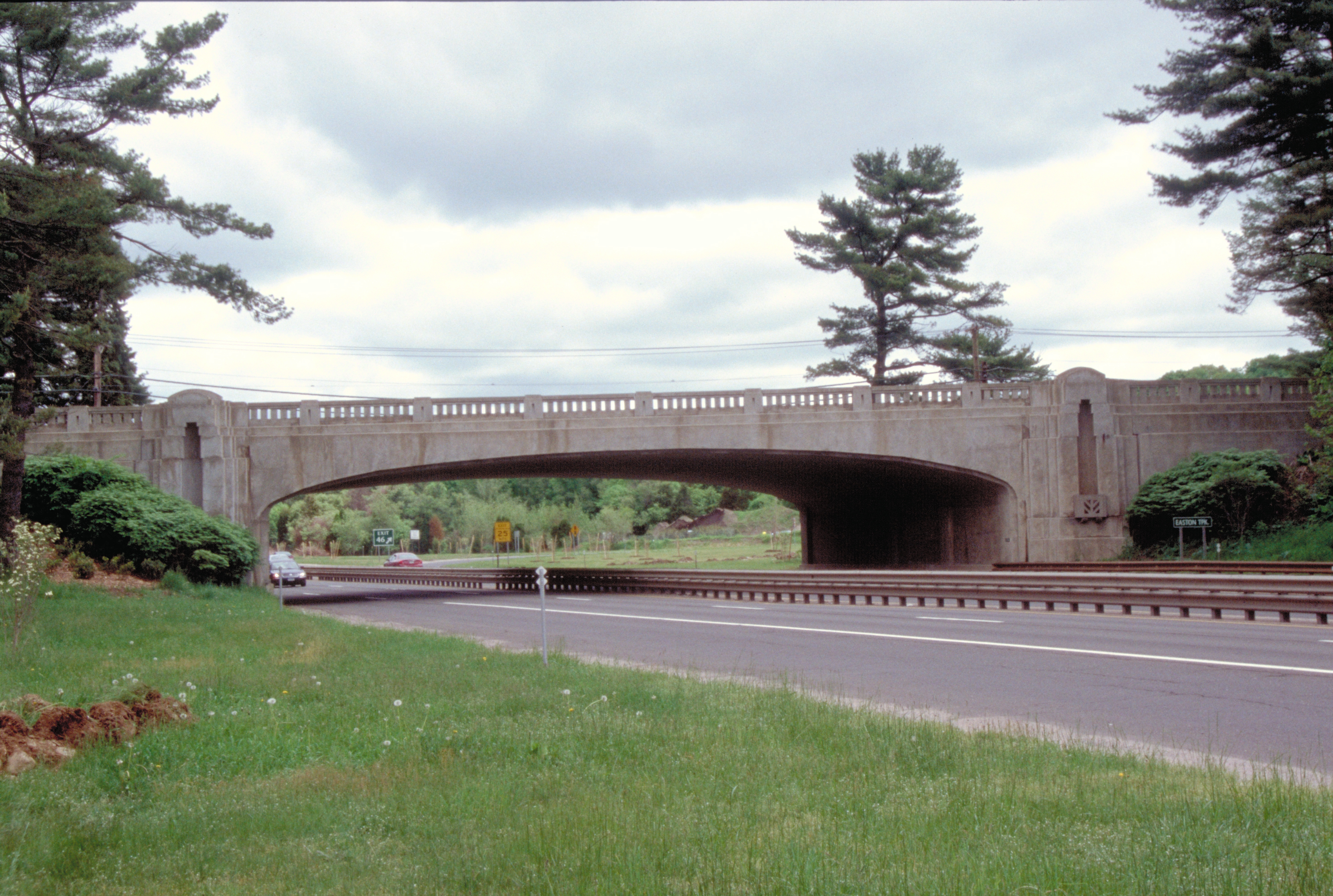
A concrete rigid-frame bridge on the Merritt Parkway in Fairfield CT, United States, designed by architect George Dunkelberger

A rigid-frame bridge is a bridge in which the superstructure and substructure are rigidly connected to act as a continuous unit. Typically, the structure is cast monolithically, making the structure continuous from deck to foundation. The connections between members are rigid connections which transfer bending moment, axial forces, and shear forces. A bridge design consisting of a rigid frame can provide significant structural benefits, but can also be difficult to design and construct.

== History ==
The use of rigid-frame bridges began in Germany in the early twentieth century and quickly spread to the Americas. Emílio Henrique Baumgart and Arthur G. Hayden, in particular, gained notoriety for their use of concrete rigid frames in the early 1920s. At the time, reinforced concrete was commonly used in bridge design but the superstructure was designed with bearings on the substructure. In concrete rigid-frame design, there are no bearings. Instead the superstructure is cast monolithically with the substructure and the entire bridge from deck to footing is continuous.

Engineers have found this type of design advantageous for many reasons. Moments at the center of the deck of a rigid-frame bridge are smaller than the corresponding moments in a simply supported deck. Therefore, a much shallower cross section at mid-span can be used. Additional benefits are that less space is required for the approaches and structural details for where the deck bears on the abutments are not necessary. Engineers have also noted some disadvantages of rigid frame bridges. The placement of steel reinforcing bars (rebars) can be very difficult and the forming/placement of the concrete is complicated. Furthermore, rigid frames are statically indeterminate and the analysis is more challenging than that of simply supported structures.

== Types of rigid-frame bridge ==
=== Single span ===
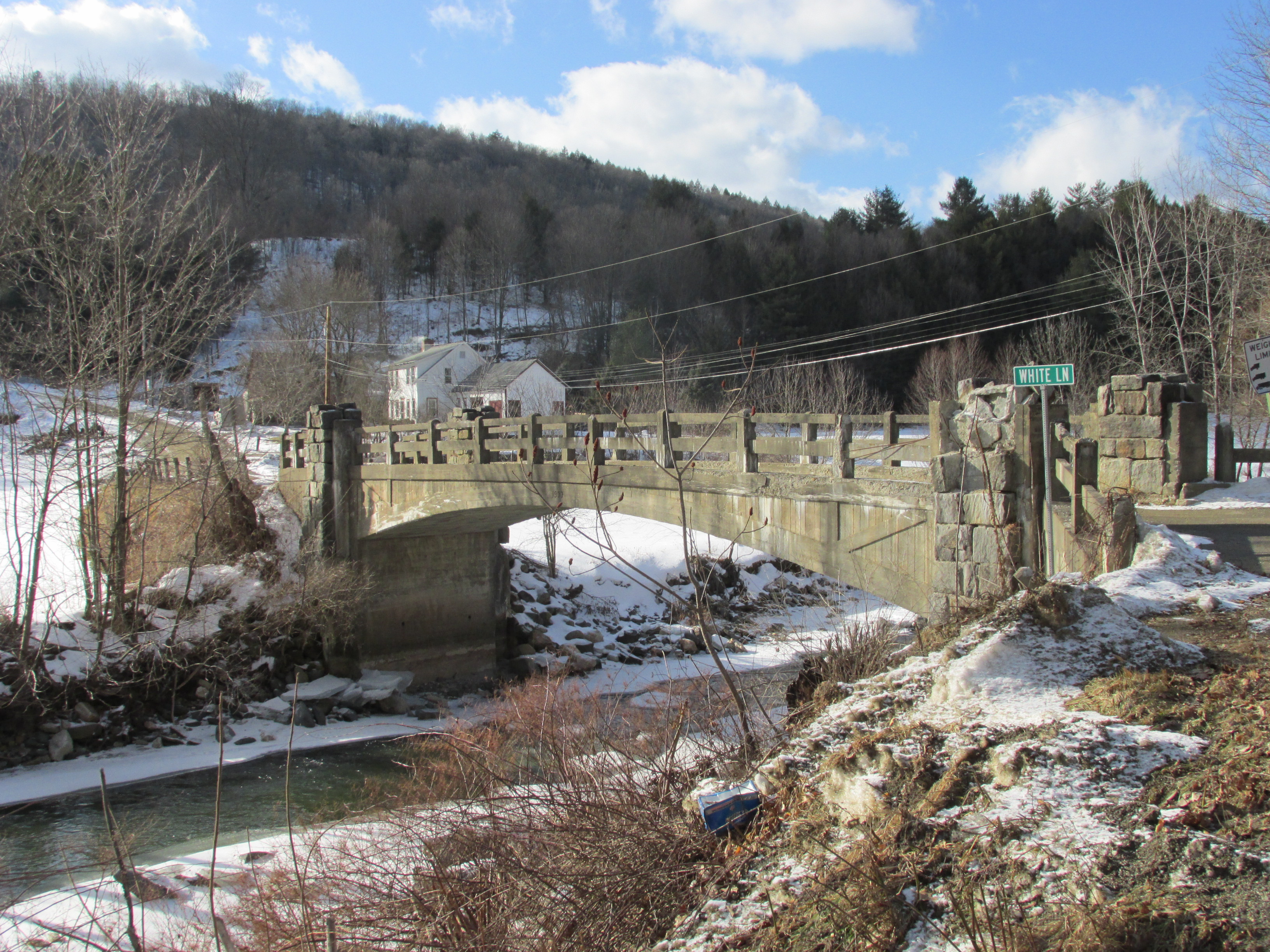
Single-Span Over River, United States

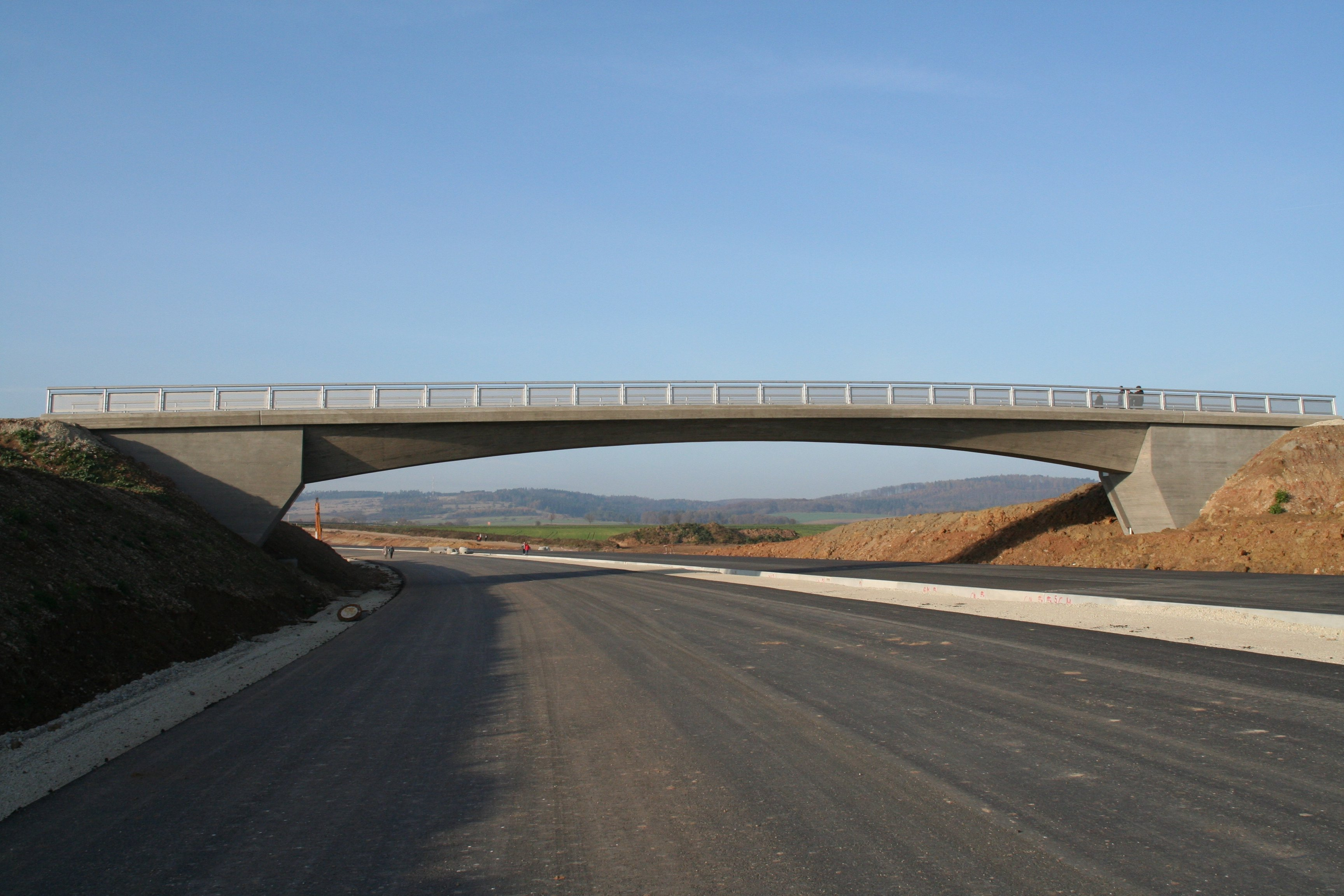
Single Span Over Roadway, Germany

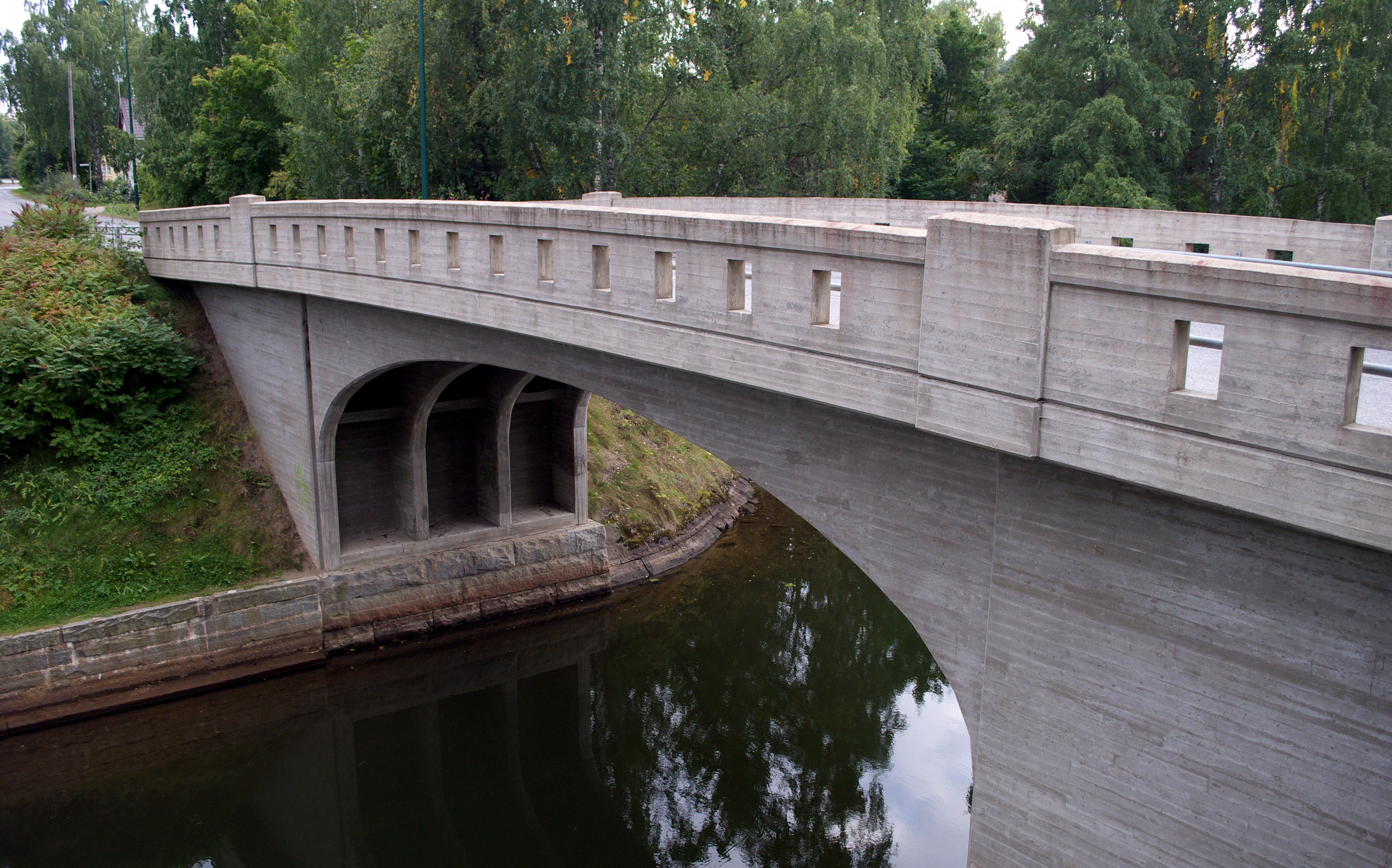
Single-Span in Shape of Arch, Finland

Single span rigid-frame bridges are typically made of reinforced concrete and are commonly used on parkways and other roadways. This design is an efficient use of material as the cross section at mid-span is relatively narrow and the amount of concrete needed at the abutments is reduced. The narrow section at mid-span gives the bridge profile a slight arch shape making this design particularly useful when large headroom is required. The profile also makes the bridge more architecturally pleasing than a beam bridge. Rigid-frame design may be the most efficient bridge type for spans between 35 and 80 feet (11 and 24 m). If steel is used, the economic advantage extends to spans of 120 feet (37 m).

=== V-shaped ===
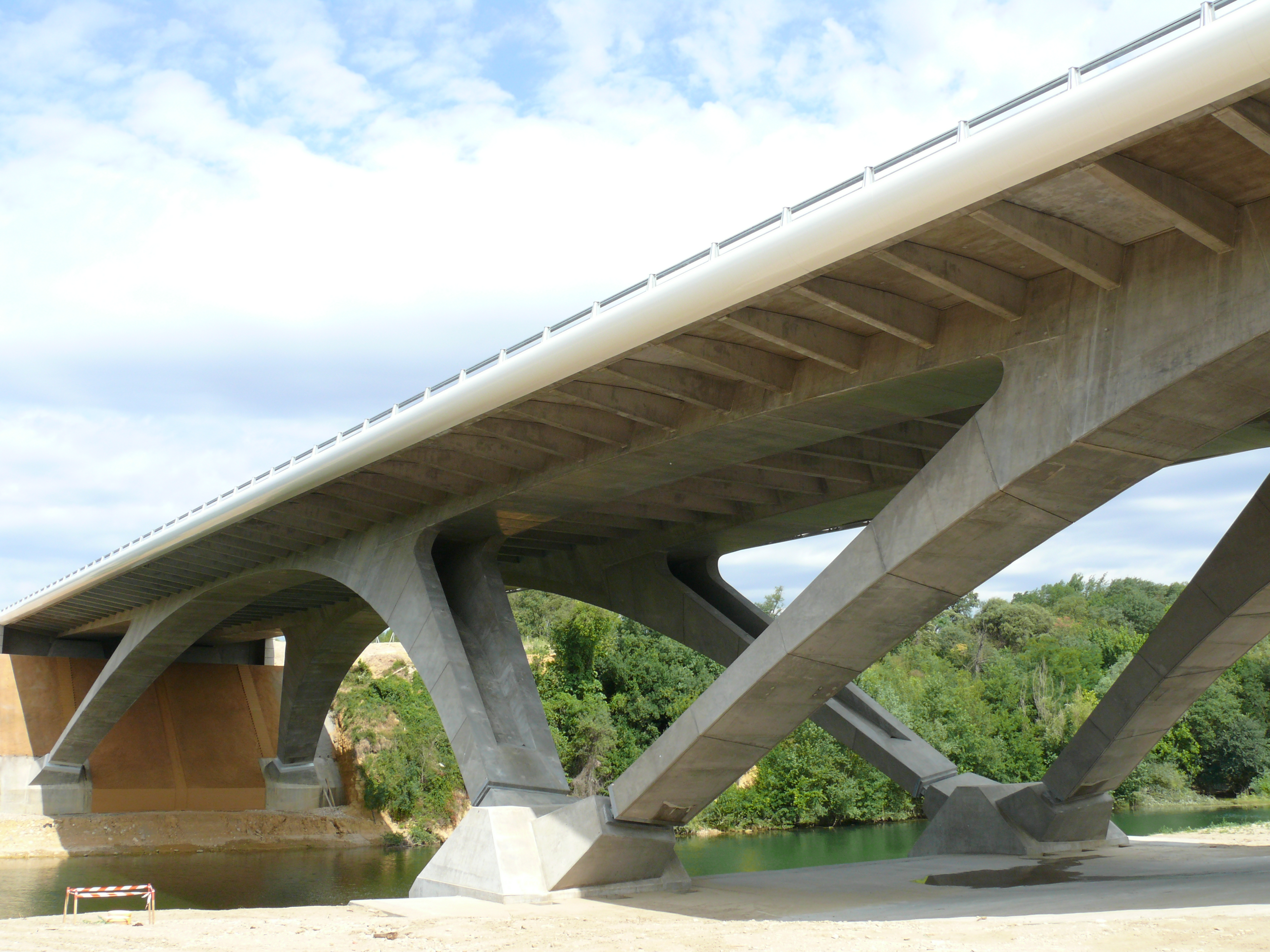
Pont du Languedoc, France, elevation

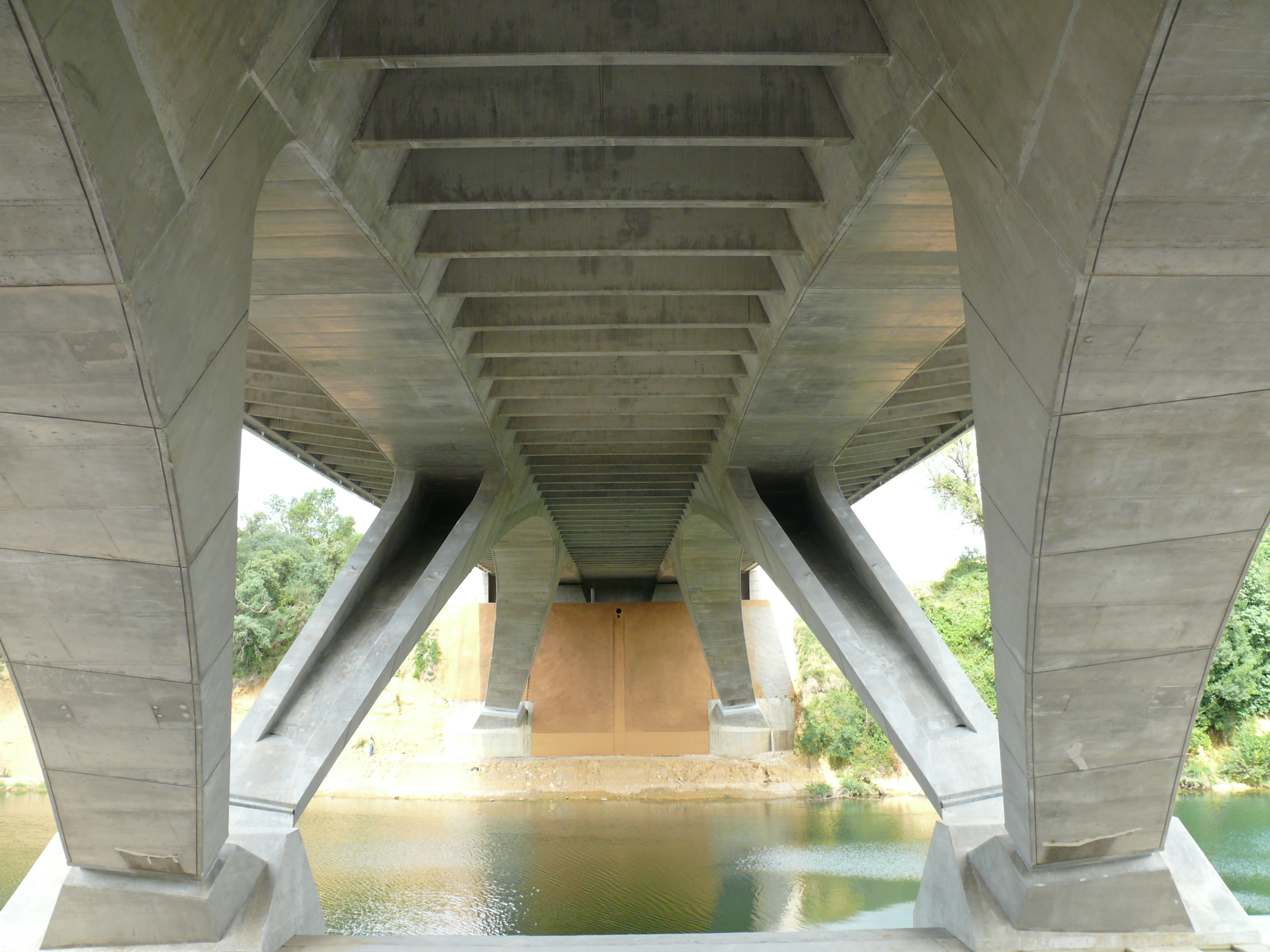
Pont du Languedoc, France, below

A V-shaped rigid frame is an efficient way to support a longer bridge where using only one span isn't feasible. Each V-shaped pier supports the deck in two places while only requiring one foundation. The bending moments experienced in the piers are minimal, allowing significant reductions in the foundation size. Additionally, the effective length of each span is shortened compared to the spans of a bridge with vertical piers. However, this system is less commonly used in rigid frame bridges because the piers need to be approximately centered under the bridge. Often the bridges span over roadways or waterways and construction of piers in those cases can be costly and challenging.

=== Batter-post ===
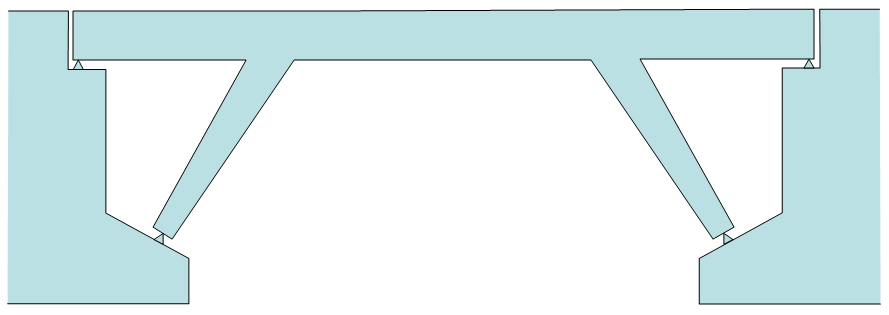
Diagram of a batter-post rigid frame bridge

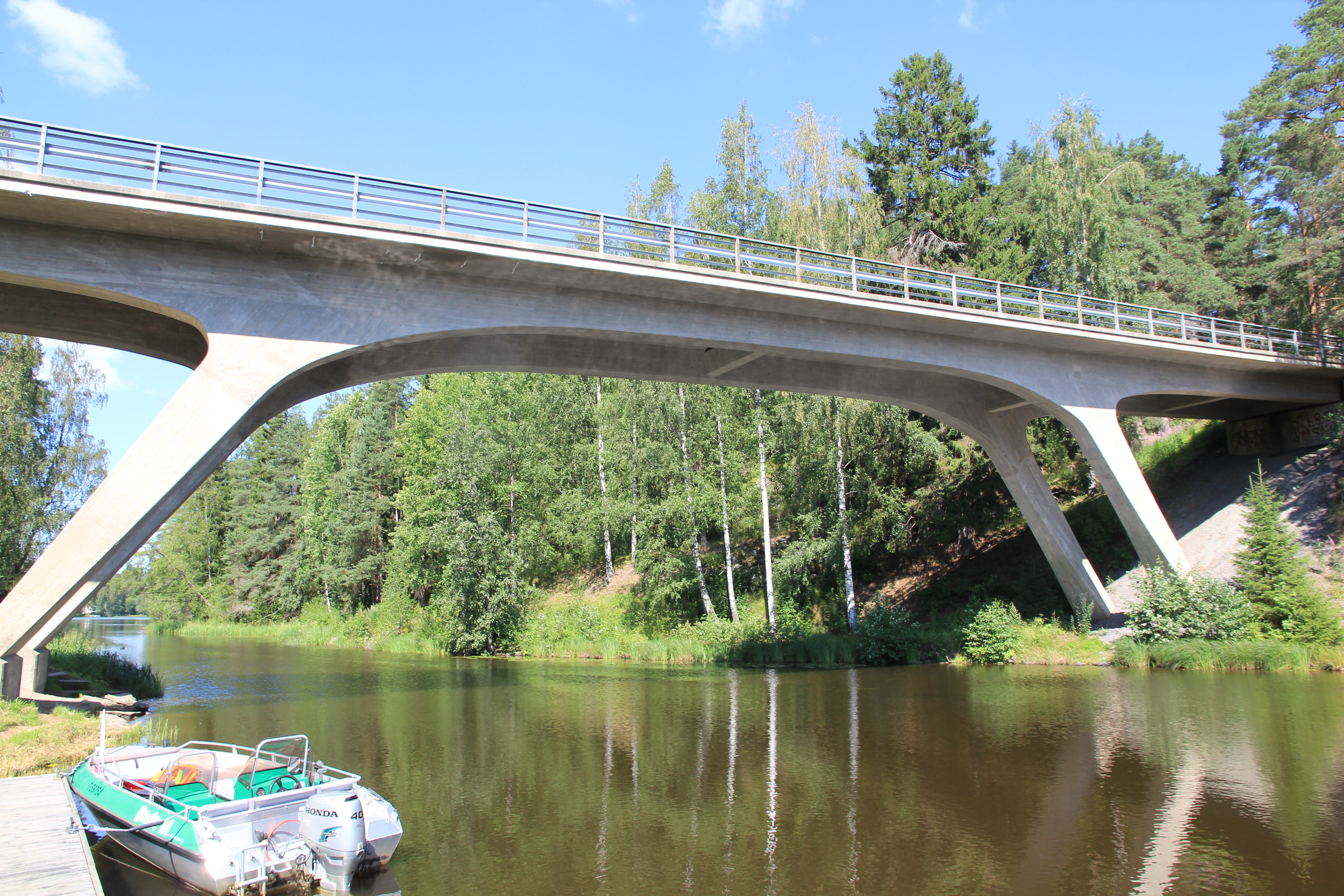
Concrete Batter-Post Bridge, Finland

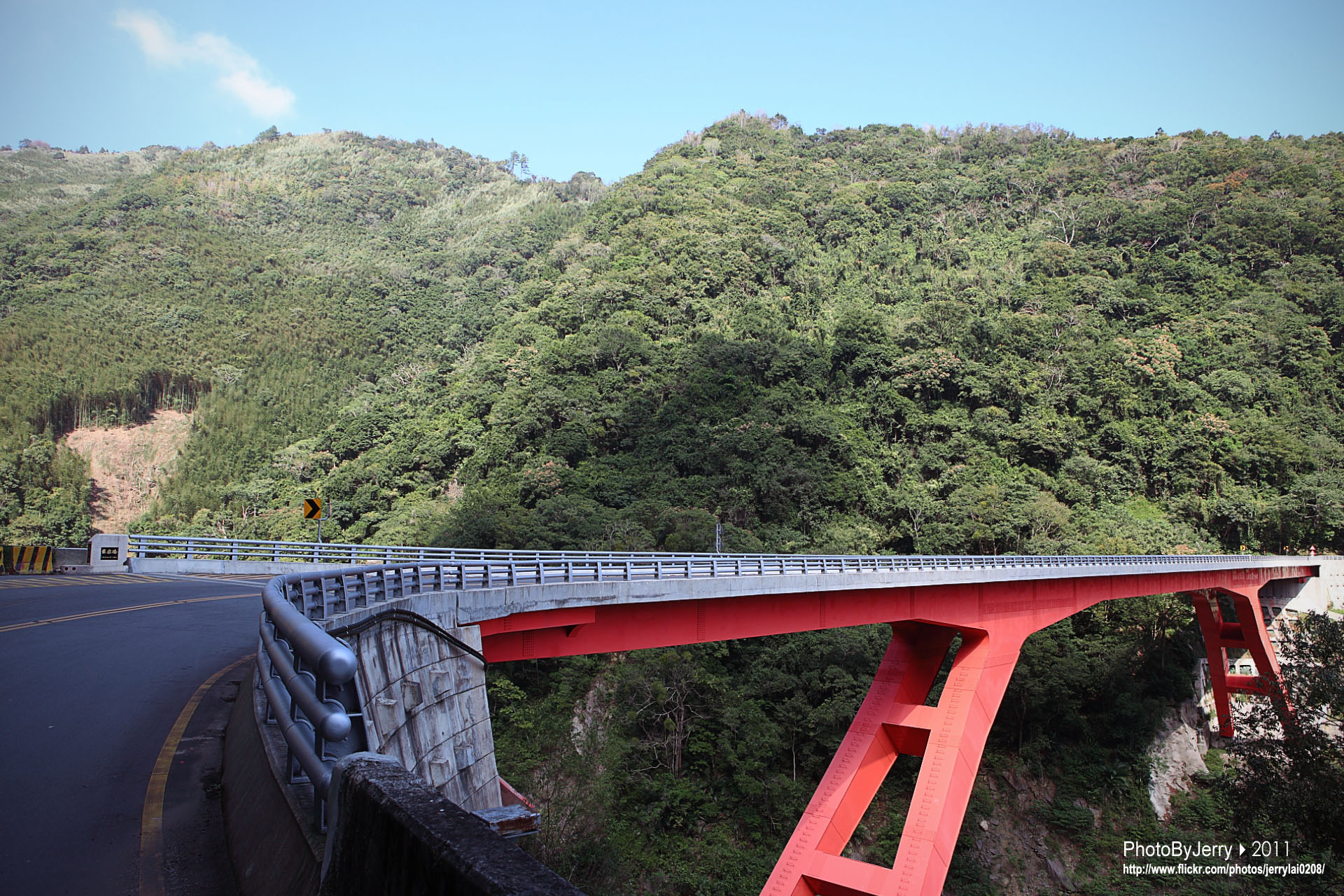
Steel Batter-Post Bridge, Japan or Taiwan

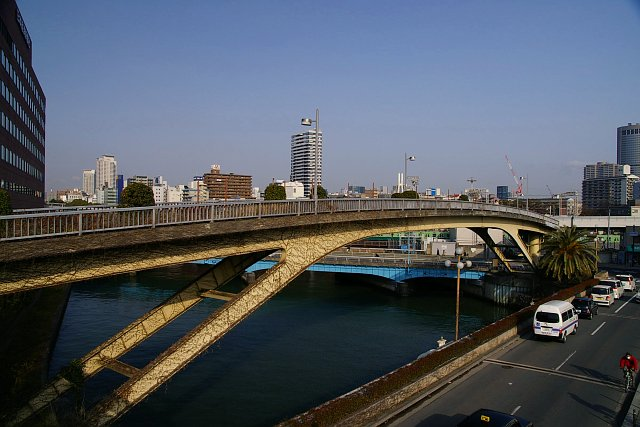
Batter-Post Bridge, Japan

Batter-post rigid frame bridges are defined by their supports that run from the deck to the abutments at an angle. This design supports the deck in a similar way to v-shaped piers but differs in how the foundations must be built. The piers bear on or next to the abutments, eliminating the need for foundations directly beneath the bridge. This is particularly advantageous when the bridge crosses a river and constructing a foundation in the water is challenging. As a result, either the abutments have to be made larger or additional foundations must be placed next to the abutments.

== Recent advances ==
In the past few years, most research on rigid frame bridges is related to retrofitting existing structures to meet new seismic specifications. This research often finds that the amount of reinforcing required at beam-to-column joints needs to be increased in concrete structures. In many bridges, the amount of steel required by the seismic code causes congestion at the joints. To alleviate this, steel fibers can be used as reinforcement to improve the bond between the rebars and the surrounding concrete. Tests have shown that by using steel fiber reinforced concrete, the anchorage length of rebar can be reduced while improving shear and flexural capacities. The reduced anchorage length required reduces the congestion at beam-to-column joints.

Another advancement is in the use of prestressed concrete. Prestressed concrete is a major advance in concrete engineering and has effectively been used in rigid frame bridge construction. This is notable because it was already challenging to place standard reinforcing in a concrete rigid frame bridge. Prestressing the rebars is more difficult but was proven to still be feasible. Prestressed concrete is useful in bridge construction because it has higher tensile strength than traditional reinforced concrete, allowing for longer bridge spans.
