= Turn-of-River Bridge =

- U.S. National Register of Historic Places
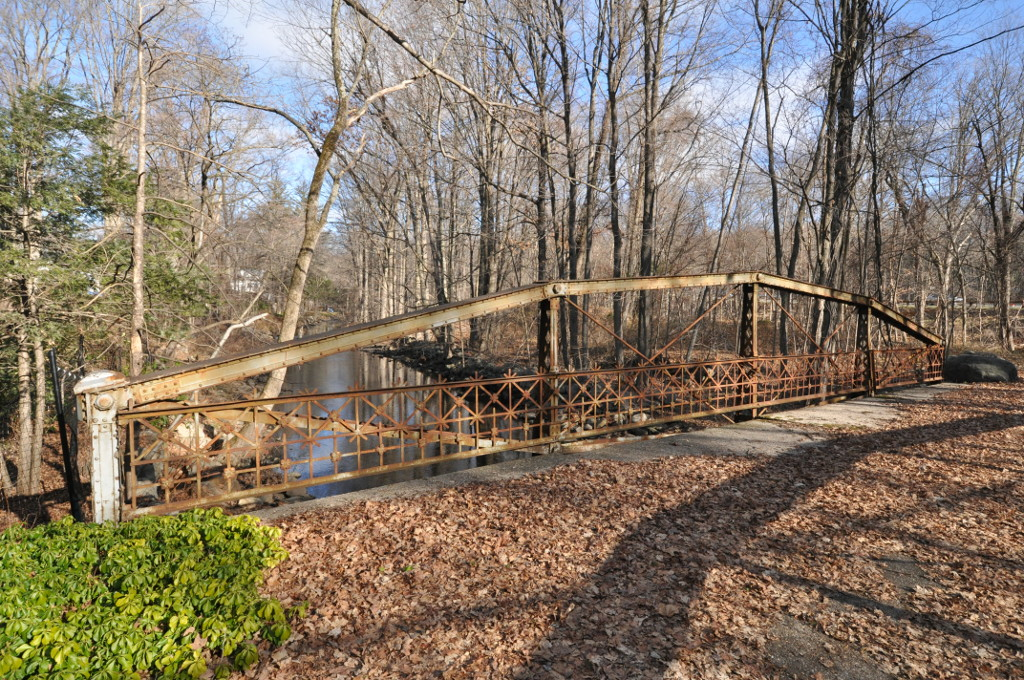

- Location within Connecticut Location within the United States
- Location: Old North Stamford Road at Rippowam River, Stamford, Connecticut
- Coordinates: 41°6′47″N 73°32′42.5″W
- Area: less than one acre
- Built: 1892
- Architect: Berlin Iron Bridge Co.
- Architectural style: Lenticular pony truss
- NRHP reference No.: 87000798
- Added to NRHP: July 31, 1987

The Turn-of-River Bridge, also known as Old North Stamford Road Bridge, is a single-span lenticular pony truss bridge built by the Berlin Iron Bridge Company in 1892. It was listed on the National Register of Historic Places in 1987. It formerly brought the Old Stamford Road across the Rippowam River, but is now open only to pedestrian traffic, as the road ends shortly before the bridge.

The bridge uses the design patented by William O. Douglas in 1878 for a lens-type truss bridge, and is built out of wrought and cast iron, with pin connections, and has a concrete deck. It rests on stone abutments, and has a total span of 53 feet (16 m). It is one of only about twenty lenticular truss bridges remaining in the state. It is now open only to pedestrian traffic.

== See also ==
- List of bridges documented by the Historic American Engineering Record in Connecticut
- List of bridges on the National Register of Historic Places in Connecticut
- National Register of Historic Places listings in Stamford, Connecticut
