= Rippowam River =

River in Connecticut and New York, US

Coordinates: 41.0474°N 73.5450°W

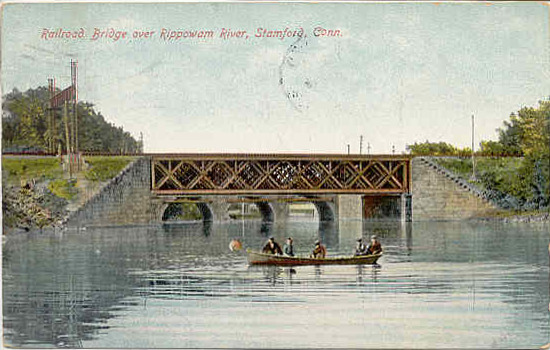
New Haven railroad line at the Mill (Rippowam) River crossing, Stamford, Connecticut, about 1908

The Rippowam River is a river in Fairfield County, Connecticut and Westchester County, New York (United States). It drains a catchment area of 37.5 square miles (97 km^{2}) and flows for 17 miles (27 km) from Ridgefield to Long Island Sound, which it enters in Stamford's harbor.

Streamflow in the Rippowam River is controlled by several small dams. The Turn-of-River Bridge, which is listed on the National Register of Historic Places, crosses it. The river has been dammed to form both the North Stamford Reservoir in North Stamford, and the Laurel Reservoir on the Stamford/New Canaan border.

The lower eight miles of Rippowam River, from the North Stamford Reservoir to Harbor Point (Stamford), are known as Mill River according to the Trust for Public Land, although U.S. Geological Survey maps and documents based on them don't reflect this information. The upper part of the river, in Westchester County, is also called Mill River, as shown in USGS maps Variant names for the Rippowam River include Mill River, Collins Brook, Mud Pond Brook, Rippowan River, Scotts Corner Brook, Stamford Mill River, Stoneford Mill River, Tomok River, and Turn River, according to the US Board on Geographic Names.

Architect Philip Johnson built his Glass House on the eastern slope of the Rippowam River valley in New Canaan in the late 1940s to take advantage of the view of the valley formed by the river.

== Gallery ==
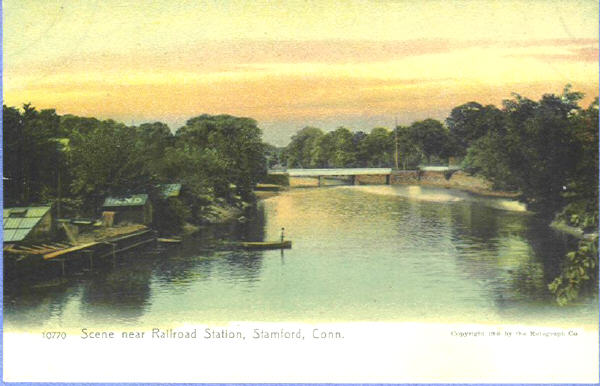
The river just south of the railroad bridge in the South End of Stamford, about 1905

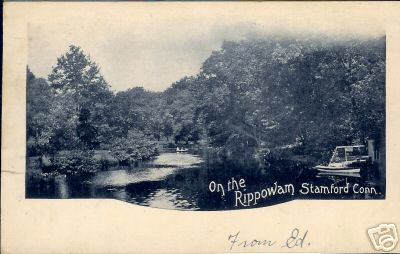
Rippowam River, about 1905

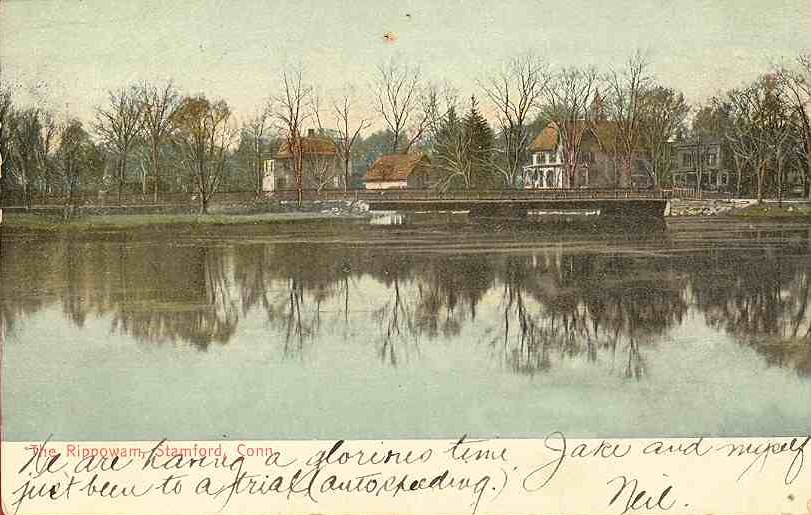
River scene from a postcard mailed in 1906

== See also ==
- List of rivers in Connecticut
- Byram River
- Mianus River
- Norwalk River
