= Wepawaug River =

River in Connecticut, USA

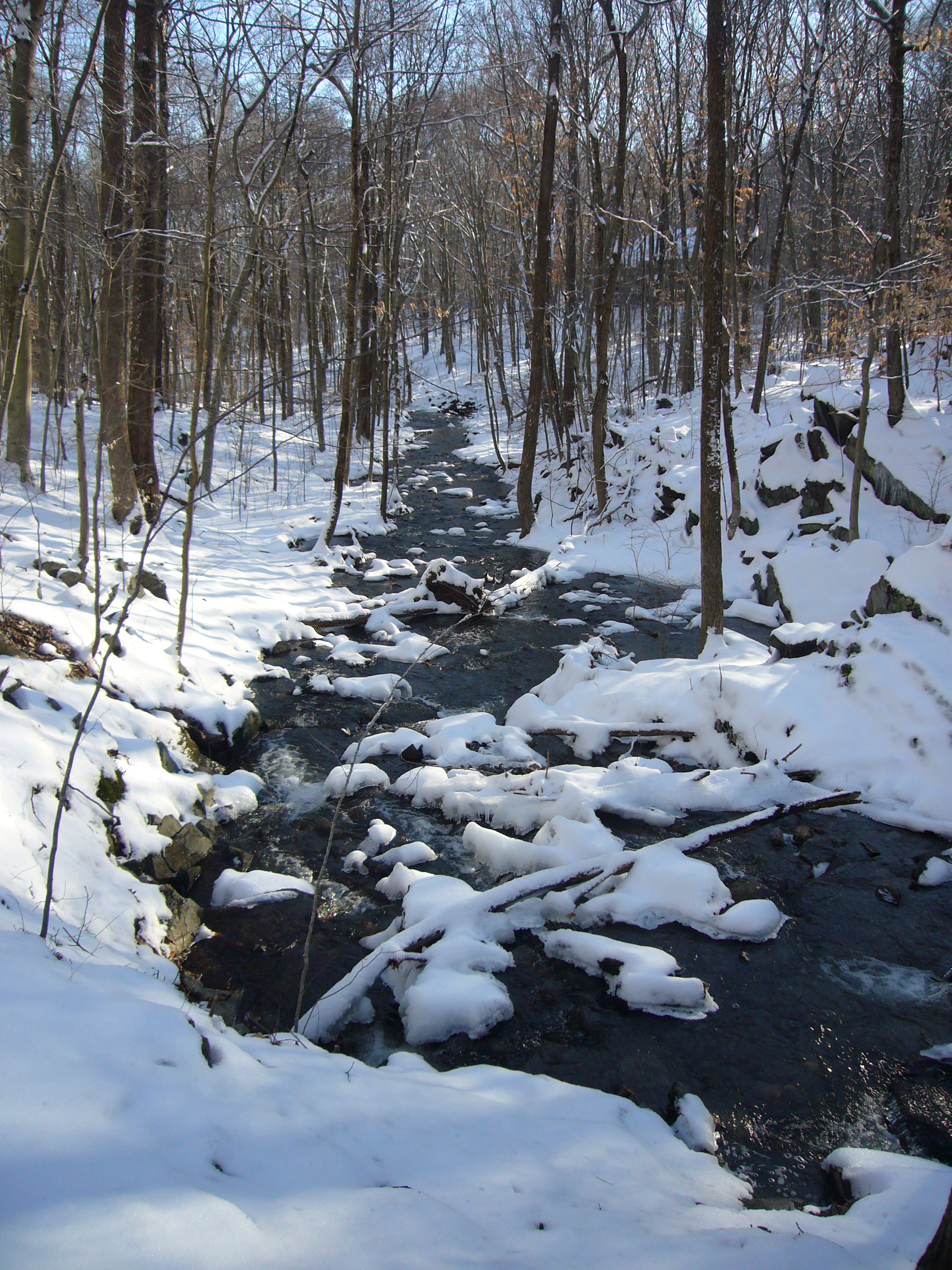
- Below Wepawaug Falls in Woodbridge, Connecticut.

Location
- Country: United States
- State: Connecticut
- County: New Haven

Physical characteristics
- Source: Woodbridge, Connecticut
- Mouth: Milford Harbor to Long Island Sound
  - location: Milford, Connecticut
  - coordinates: 41°13′19″N 73°03′19″W

The Wepawaug River is a stream in New Haven County in the U.S. state of Connecticut. It rises in Woodbridge and flows through Orange and Milford before discharging into Milford Harbor on Long Island Sound. The river is dammed at more than ten places. In Orange, dams form the Wepawaug Reservoir, managed by the South Central Connecticut Regional Water Authority and Lake Wepawaug. In Milford, dams form the Upper and Lower Lagoons. Race Brook is a tributary.

== History ==
English settlers built a grist mill by the river in 1640. Another mill on the river in Orange made fabric for union soldiers’ uniforms during the American Civil War.

== Crossings ==
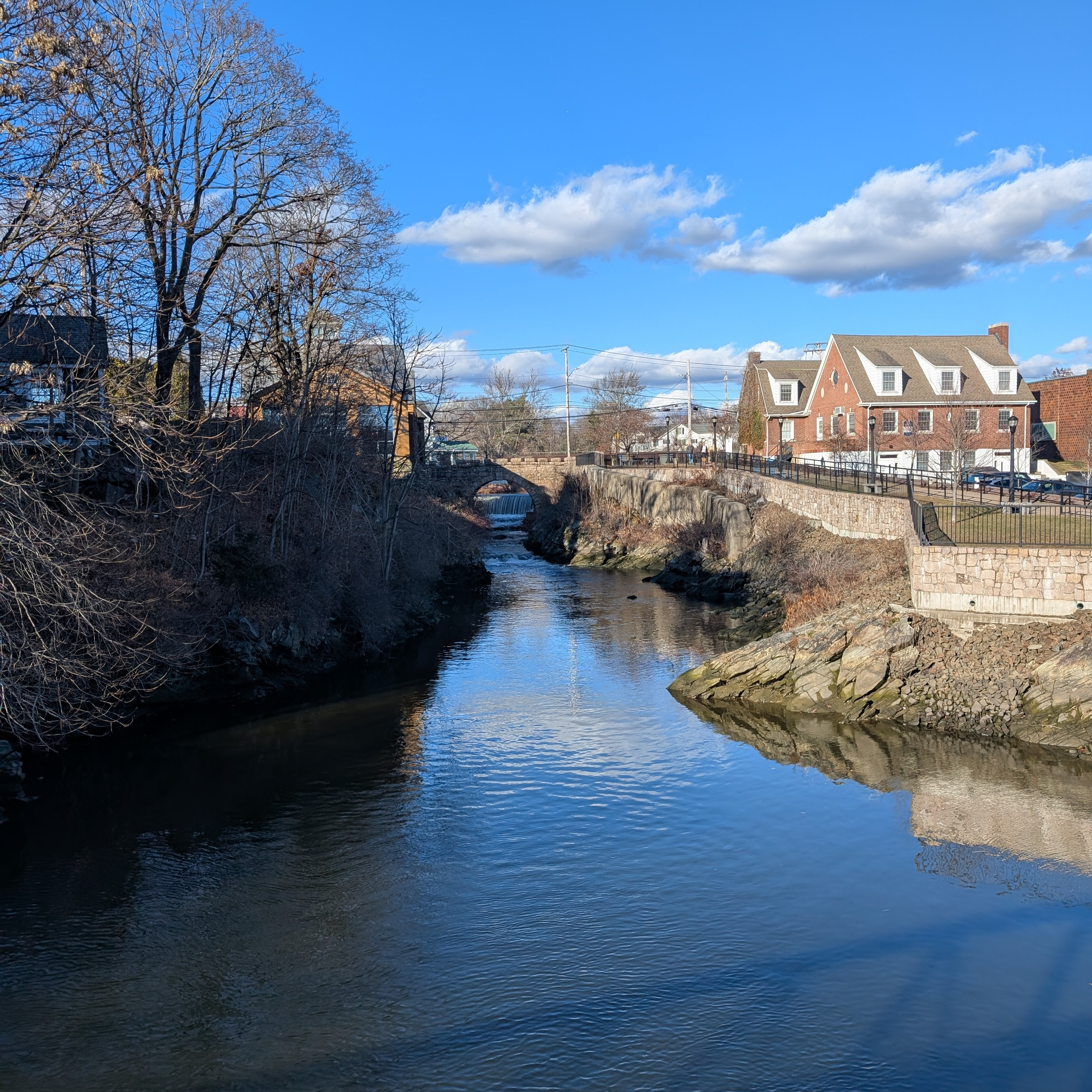
Below Memorial Bridge

The stone Memorial Bridge was built across the river in Milford in 1899 to commemorate Milford's history and bears the names of Milford's first settlers. The river is also crossed by U.S. Route 1, Interstate 95, Route 34 and the Wilbur Cross Parkway.

== See also ==
- List of rivers of Connecticut
