= Shaw's Cove Bridge =

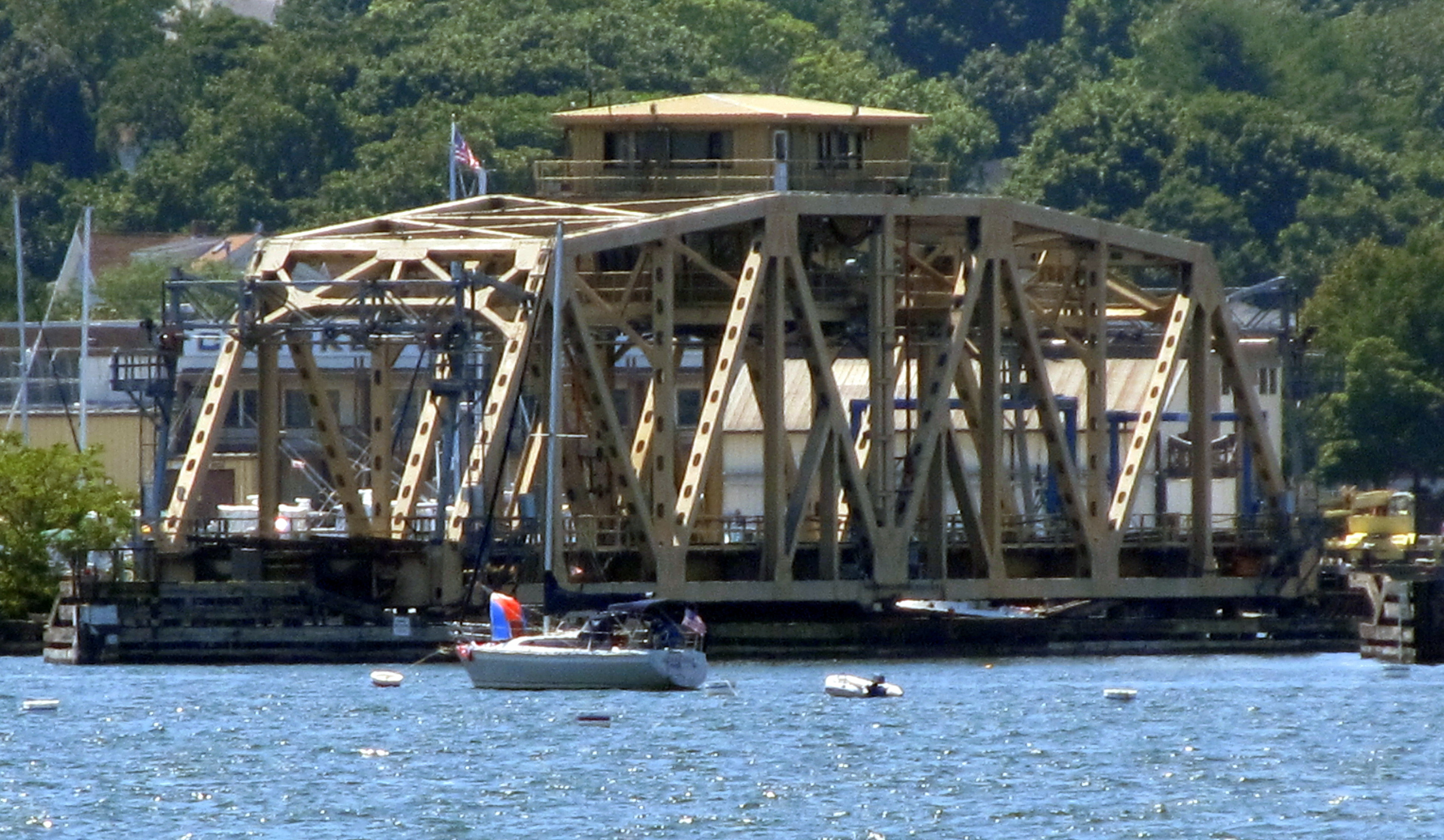
- Coordinates: 41°20′57″N 72°05′49″W
- Carries: Two railroad tracks
- Crosses: Shaw's Cove
- Locale: New London, Connecticut
- Official name: Shaw's Cove Bridge
- Maintained by: Amtrak

Characteristics
- Design: Truss with swing opening
- Material: Steel
- Total length: 634 feet (193 m)
- Clearance below: 6 feet (1.8 m) (vertical), two 35-foot (11 m) channels (horizontal)

History
- Built: 1913 (replaced 1984)

Shaw's Cove Bridge is a swing bridge in New London, Connecticut built in 1984, replacing a similar bridge built in 1913. The span carries railroad tracks used by Amtrak for their train along the Northeast Corridor while allowing boat traffic to go through.

== History ==
In 1891, a Pratt truss bridge was constructed to cross over the cove. The bridge was built over a center pier and end stone masonry piers. In 1913, the span was replaced with a 136 feet (41 m) swing bridge span sitting on the original piers. The span was Pratt through truss of the rim-bearing type which has a circulator drum and rollers along the perimeter of the center pier. This type of mechanisms was an early design of swing bridge variants which was later replaced with center-bearing type. The bridge undergone substantial repairs in 1917, 1924, 1932, and 1938. The 1913 span was added to the National Register of Historic Places as an example of early type of swing bridges.

== Replacement ==
In the 1980s, Federal Railroad Administration funded the $4 billion Northeast Corridor Improvement Project (NECIP) to fully electrify the Northeast Corridor between Washington, DC and Boston. As part of the project, Amtrak upgraded several portions of Northeast Corridor infrastructure in preparation for the launch of the Acela Express service. This included a replacement of the Shaw's Cove Bridge in 1984.

== Current operations ==
Amtrak currently opens the bridge more often than required by Coast Guard regulations. The Shaw’s Cove bridge opens on signal 24 hours a day throughout the year. A delay of up to 10 minutes may be expected if a train is approaching. When a vessel is in an emergency that may endanger life or property, the draw opens as soon as possible. The operations in winter can be challenging. Occasionally, the bridge would not close for several hours causing trains to be delayed due to mechanical issues caused by extreme cold temperature. Similar issues can cause the bridge not to be able to open for marine traffic for several days.

== Gallery ==
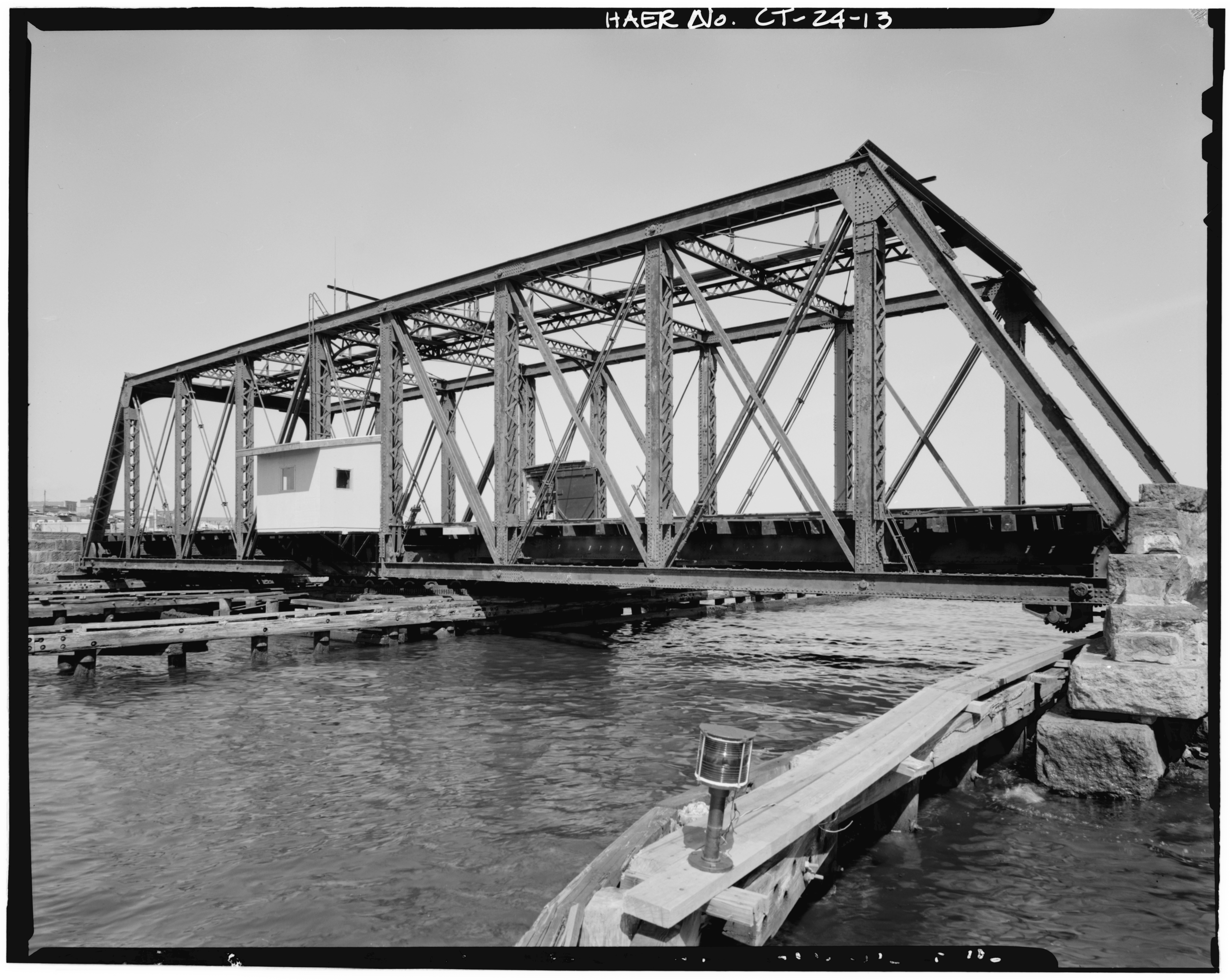
The 1913 span

Shaw's Cove Railroad Bridge closing
