= List of bridges of the Merritt Parkway =

This is a list of bridges of the Merritt Parkway, which is located in Fairfield County, Connecticut.

The 69 original bridges and three original culverts were designed by George L. Dunkelberger. Each bridge has a unique design that represents various 1930s architectural styles, such as Art Deco, Art Moderne, French Renaissance, Gothic, Neoclassicism, and Rustic. 23 of the bridges have been reconstructed in recent years, two of the original bridges were demolished in 1979, and one bridge was destroyed during the Great Flood of 1955. The presence of these artistic bridges is one of the reasons that the Merritt Parkway has been listed on the National Register of Historic Places (NRHP) and documented by the Historic American Engineering Record (HAER).

Below is a list of the 42 bridges spanning the Merritt Parkway and another list of the 39 bridges carrying the Merritt Parkway. The lists are arranged from south to north.

== Bridges spanning the Merritt Parkway ==
Bridge No.	Carries	Location	Built	Design	Notes	HAER No.
695	Round Hill Road	MP 3.48, Greenwich 41.0839°N 73.6652°W	1935	Moderne/Modern Classicism. Single span, segmental arch on piers, 24 ft (7.3 m). Concrete with cast-concrete ornament.	Adaptation of classical arch with keystone on pylons. Balustrade abstracted from classical sources.	CT-68
696	Lake Avenue	MP 4.69, Greenwich 41.0956°N 73.6487°W	1940	Art Deco. Double-arched rigid frame steel span resting on steel center piers. Abutments faced with random ashlar stone.	Center piers and spans carry cast-iron ornament of grapevines and classicizing urns. Metal parts originally polychromed, and previous painted bright blue. As of October 2019, the bridge is now black with gold accents.	CT-69
697	North Street	MP 5.65, Greenwich 41.0945°N 73.6324°W	1937 (reconstructed 1993)	Moderne/Modern Classicism. Concrete cast to suggest rusticated masonry. Single span, segmental arch on piers.	Abstracted, simplified classicism apparent in balustrade.	CT-70
699	Stanwich Road	MP 7.44, Greenwich 41.0973°N 73.6036°W	1936 (reconstructed 1990)	Moderne. Concrete rigid frame bridge. Single span, segmental arch on piers, 64 ft (20 m).	Bas-relief shield displaying winged wheel near top of each abutment. Cream-colored concrete with gray cast ornament.	CT-72
700	Guinea Road	MP 8.11, Stamford 41.1008°N 73.5921°W	1937	Classical Revival/Rustic. Concrete arch bridge, 80 ft (24 m). Single span, segmental arch.	Faced with rock-faced rubble stone and with rusticated voussoirs of rock-faced granite.	CT-73
702	Riverbank Road	MP 8.60, Stamford 41.1006°N 73.5822°W	1937	Moderne. Concrete rigid-frame bridge. Single span, segmental arch on piers, 63 ft (19 m).	Faceted pylons; abstracted classical balustrades with enlarged faceted pedestals separating sections of plain balusters.	CT-75
704	Wire Mill Road	MP 9.91, Stamford 41.1065°N 73.5593°W	1938	Moderne/Modern Classicism. Rigid frame bridge. Single span, segmental arch on piers, 63 ft (19 m).	Concrete, colored gray and yellow. Balustrade with cartouche at center of span bearing Connecticut State Seal. Arching approaches.	CT-77
707	Newfield Avenue	MP 11.34, Stamford 41.1163°N 73.5352°W	1937 (reconstructed 1995)	Art Deco. Concrete with cast concrete ornament. Single span, segmental arch on piers.	Cartouche bearing Connecticut State Seal above center of span flanked by banding of geometric ornament with curving striations.	CT-80
708	Ponus Ridge Road	MP 12.29, New Canaan 41.1189°N 73.5175°W	1937	Moderne/Modern Classicism. Concrete rigid frame bridge. Single span, segmental arch on piers, 63 ft (19 m).	Cast-concrete ornament. Rusticated abutments; balustrade with cartouche bearing Connecticut State Seal at center of span.	CT-81
710	Metro-North Railroad bridge	MP 13.32, New Canaan 41.1170°N 73.4980°W	1937	Moderne. Concrete. Double span, segmental arches on piers, restrained ornament.		CT-83
711/5810	Lapham Road	MP 13.55, New Canaan 41.1165°N 73.4937°W	1989	Art Deco. Rigid frame concrete with cast-concrete ornament. Single span, segmental arch on piers, 63 ft (19 m).	Crenellated parapet. Cast panels with floral motifs ornament abutments. Grooved striations follow vertical and horizontal lines of abutments and span. Original 1937 bridge replaced.	CT-38
712	South Avenue (Route 124)	MP 14.14, New Canaan 41.1191°N 73.4831°W	1937 (reconstructed 1997)	Art Deco. Concrete with cast concrete ornament. Single span, segmental arch on piers.	Saw-toothed parapet. On abutments, exuberant bas-relief scrolls rise as from fountain.	CT-84
713	White Oak Shade Road	MP 14.71, New Canaan 41.1232°N 73.4737°W	1938 (reconstructed 1991)	Moderne. Concrete rigid frame, with cast-concrete ornament. Single span, segmental arch on piers, 63 ft (19 m).	Saw-toothed parapet. On abutments, ornaments suggesting exfoliation of stone curl over vertical rods.	CT-85
714/5811	Marvin Ridge Road	MP 15.13, New Canaan 41.1271°N 73.4675°W	1989	Moderne/Modern Classicism. Rigid frame concrete with cast-concrete ornament. Single span, segmental arch on piers, 63 ft (19 m).	Inset panels with high relief urns on blue backgrounds near tops of abutments. Parapets have bas-relief panels imitating Roman grilles. Abstracted outlines of urns also inscribed under bridge. Original 1937 bridge replaced.	CT-86
716	Comstock Hill Avenue	MP 16.53, Norwalk 41.1375°N 73.4449°W	1938 (reconstructed 1989)	Moderne. Concrete rigid frame bridge with cast-concrete ornament. Single span, segmental arch on piers, 60 ft (18 m).	Abutments have inset bas-relief panels depicting a Puritan and an Indian. Parapet of simple posts and panels.	CT-88
722	West Rocks Road	MP 18.08, Norwalk 41.1455°N 73.4174°W	1938 (reconstructed 1986)	Moderne. Structural steel rigid frame bridge. Single span, segmental arch on piers, 64 ft (20 m).	Restrained ornament. Split pylons. Crenellated molding. Recently repaired. Chainlink fence added at top.	CT-94
723	East Rocks Road	MP 18.48, Norwalk 41.1490°N 73.4113°W	1938	Moderne/Modern Classicism. Concrete rigid frame bridge. Single span, segmental arch on piers, 77 ft (23 m).	Balustrade with Connecticut State Seal on shield at center of span.	CT-95
724	Grumman Avenue	MP 18.97, Norwalk 41.1532°N 73.4039°W	1938 (reconstructed 1997)	Moderne/Modern Classicism. Concrete rigid frame bridge. Single span, segmental arch on piers, 60 ft (18 m).	Sgraffito panels at top of abutments depict neoclassical griffons flanking Connecticut State Seal. Classicizing grille design forms metal railing. Chain-link fence added along parapet.	CT-96
726	Newtown Turnpike	MP 20.24, Westport 41.1634°N 73.3834°W	1939	French Renaissance Revival. Concrete rigid frame bridge, 60 ft (18 m). Double span, rounded arches.	Concrete cast and treated to imitate random ashlar stone facing. Apparently inspired by fortified bridge; historicizing details include solid parapet which, at the center of span, juts out around corbelled bracket or platform.	CT-98
729	Clinton Avenue	MP 21.30, Westport 41.1634°N 73.3633°W	1940	Moderne with classicizing details. Concrete abutments, steel span and railing. Single span, segmental arch on piers.	Tower-like abutments with waterspouts. Shield patterns in metal railing.	CT-100
732	North Avenue	MP 22.46, Westport 41.1685°N 73.3422°W	1939	Art Deco. Concrete rigid frame bridge. Single span, segmental arch on piers, 60 ft (18 m).	Fiddle-head fern motif appears in two-toned concrete sgraffito within vertical stepped panels on abutments and in wrought-iron railing. Ferns, flowers, and snail are depicted in sgraffito panels that terminate parapets. Sgraffito undercourse is aggregate of Wisconsin black onyx and Swedish emerald pearl. Chain link fence added to parapet.	CT-103
735	Merwins Lane	MP 24.23, Fairfield 41.1802°N 73.3129°W	1940	Art Deco. Concrete, double span with segmental arches on piers.	Concrete of center pier and abutments cast in horizontal layers that resemble overlapping clapboards. Sculptural, free-standing concrete butterflies on abutments. Metal railing: spider webs in panels with cast spider applied in different place on each panel.	CT-106
736	Redding Road	MP 24.71, Fairfield 41.1853°N 73.3069°W	1939	Moderne. Concrete, single span, segmental arch on piers.	Crenellated parapet	CT-107
737	Congress Street	MP 25.22, Fairfield 41.1900°N 73.2995°W	1938	Moderne. Concrete rigid frame bridge. Single span, segmental arch on piers, 60 ft (18 m).	Towering skyscraper-like pylons flank a parapet with panels that project and recede in steps.	CT-108
739	Burr Street	MP 25.97, Fairfield 41.1943°N 73.2859°W	1939 (reconstructed 1994)	Moderne. Concrete, cast-concrete ornament. Single span, segmental arch on piers.	Abutments vertically striated with deep grooves and have cast bas-relief panels depicting engineers working on Parkway. Concrete parapet is crenellated and pierced. Chain-link fence added to parapet.	CT-110
742	Morehouse Drive	MP 27.75, Fairfield 41.2111°N 73.2622°W	1939	Art Deco. Concrete, cast-concrete ornament. Double span, segmental arches on piers.	In cast concrete, grid of recessed lines suggests structure made of square blocks. Within squares, geometric patterning that features concentric quarter circles is concentrated on stepped, pierced parapet. Chain link fence added to east side parapet.	CT-113
744	Easton Turnpike (Route 59)	MP 28.53, Fairfield 41.2208°N 73.2545°W	1936 (reconstructed 1995)	Moderne/Modern Classicism. Concrete, single span, segmental arch on piers.	Abutments have tall niches with grille-like ornaments at their bases. Balustrade is simple, classicizing.	CT-55
745	Park Avenue	MP 29.23, Trumbull 41.2280°N 73.2455°W	1940	Late Gothic Revival. Concrete, single span, round arch.	Bracket at center of span supported by foliate corbel. Drain spouts follow curve of arch.	CT-115
746	Plattsville Road	MP 29.60, Trumbull 41.2298°N 73.2388°W	1939	Moderne. Concrete, single span, segmental arch on piers.	Connecticut State Seal in cast concrete bas relief at center of span.	CT-116
747	Madison Avenue	MP 30.00, Trumbull 41.2317°N 73.2321°W	1939	Moderne. Concrete, single span, segmental arch on piers.	Concave vertical panels, each with a small recessed ornament centered near top, make up facing of bridge, including span. On each abutment, 2 panels fold out to form pier carrying, near top, flowers and scrolls.	CT-117
748	Main Street (Route 111)	MP 30.58, Trumbull 41.2323°N 73.2204°W	1936 (reconstructed 2003)	Moderne/Modern Classicism. Concrete, rigid frame bridge. Single span, segmental arch on piers, 60 ft (18 m).	Concrete is cast in horizontal layers resembling overlapping clapboards. Bridge is topped by alternating sections of balustrade and solid parapet.	CT-118
749	Frenchtown Road	MP 31.04, Trumbull 41.2319°N 73.2118°W	1942	French Renaissance. Double span, rounded arches.	Concrete cast and treated to resemble random ashlar stone facing and chamfered voussoirs. Buttressed center pier. Solid parapet pierced with small square openings, suggesting fortified bridge.	CT-119
4375	Route 25 south to Route 15 north ramp	MP 32.10, Trumbull 41.2354°N 73.1921°W	1981	Utilitarian. Concrete abutments with straight steel beam span.	Not on NRHP.	
4364	Route 25 south	MP 32.16, Trumbull 41.2356°N 73.1908°W	1981	Utilitarian. Concrete abutments with straight steel beam span.	Not on NRHP.	
4363	Route 25 north	MP 32.19, Trumbull 41.2356°N 73.1906°W	1981	Utilitarian. Concrete abutments with straight steel beam span.	Not on NRHP.	
4378	Route 25 north to Route 15 south ramp	MP 32.35, Trumbull 41.2361°N 73.1872°W	1981	Utilitarian. Concrete abutments with straight steel beam span.	Not on NRHP.	
751	Metro-North Railroad (abandoned)	MP 32.40, Trumbull 41.2363°N 73.1864°W	1935 (abandoned 1939)	Moderne/Utilitarian. Concrete abutments, boxed steel span, 62 feet 8 inches (19.1 m). Built-up pylons.	The panels and rivets seem to be designed at least partially for decorative appearance. Reactivated as a pedestrian bridge in 2018.	CT-56
5294	Huntington Turnpike (Route 108),	MP 33.73, Trumbull 41.2379°N 73.1613°W	1983	Utilitarian. Concrete abutments with straight steel beam span. Original 1940 trellis grille castings salvaged and reused.	Original 1940 bridge carrying the Merritt Parkway demolished 1979. Current bridge not on NRHP.	
5292	Route 15 north to Route 8 north ramp	MP 34.13, Trumbull 41.2372°N 73.1535°W	1984	Utilitarian. Concrete abutments with straight steel beam span.	Not on NRHP.	
755	Nichols-Shelton Road	MP 34.14, Trumbull 41.2372°N 73.1535°W	1940 (demolished 1979)			CT-125
5293	Route 15 south to Route 8 south ramp	MP 34.15, Trumbull 41.2371°N 73.1530°W	1984	Utilitarian. Concrete abutments with straight steel beam span.	Not on NRHP.	
759	James Farm Road	MP 36.06, Stratford 41.2410°N 73.1174°W	1940	Moderne/Modern Classicism. Concrete, double span, rounded arches.	Concrete cast to resemble rusticated masonry. Monumental pillars on each side of center pier support freestanding clusters, each made up of 4 sculpted bird wings. Pierced parapet suggests a balustrade. Cartouche on each abutment bears initials CHD, for "Connecticut Highway Department".	CT-129

== Bridges carrying the Merritt Parkway ==
Bridge No.	Crosses over	Location	Built	Design	Notes	HAER No.
691	Byram River	MP 1.63, Greenwich 41.0589°N 73.6753°W	1934 (reconstructed 1997)	Utilitarian. Concrete, single straight span.		CT-64
692/5653	Riversville Road	MP 1.78, Greenwich 41.0610°N 73.6748°W	1988	Moderne/Modern Classicism. Twin double spans, supported by center piers between road and river.	Rectangular and circular recessed panels on piers and span. Original 1935 bridge replaced.	CT-65
693	Glenville Water Company Road (private)	MP 2.31, Greenwich 41.0678°N 73.6702°W	1935	Utilitarian/Moderne, Concrete arch bridge.	Very simple; balustrade with chamfered balusters and pedestals with pyramidal caps.	CT-66
694	Converse Pond Brook	MP 2.84, Greenwich 41.0752°N 73.6694°W	1935	Utilitarian/Moderne. Concrete straight span.	Very simple; balustrade with chamfered balusters.	CT-67
698	Taconic Road	MP 6.30, Greenwich 41.0900°N 73.6223°W	1936	Moderne/Modern Classicism. Concrete arch.	High, round arch with small keystone, between tapered, obelisk-like pylons. Bas-reliefs of Connecticut State Seal on inner faces of pylons.	CT-71
701	Mianus River	MP 8.26, Stamford 41.1006°N 73.5887°W	1937			CT-74
703	Long Ridge Road (Route 104)	MP 9.47, Stamford 41.1030°N 73.5660°W	1936	Moderne. Rigid frame concrete. Segmental arch on piers, 52 ft (16 m).	Pleated parapet. Applied ornament in quarter-circle sunbursts and fountains.	CT-76
705	Rippowam River	MP 10.12, Stamford 41.1083°N 73.5556°W	1936	Rustic. Concrete arch, 56 ft (17 m).	Rock-faced random ashlar facing.	CT-78
706	High Ridge Road (Route 137)	MP 10.66, Stamford 41.1120°N 73.5465°W	1937 (reconstructed 1994)	Moderne. Structural steel. Single span, segmental arch, 45 ft (14 m).	Molded strip of geometric ornament at top of pylons.	CT-79
709	Old Stamford Road (Route 106)	MP 13.24, New Canaan 41.1172°N 73.4993°W	1937 (reconstructed 1994)	Moderne. Reinforced concrete, rigid frame. Single span, segmental arch, 45 ft (14 m).	Vertically striated pylons and solid parapet of panels and pedestals. Bas-relief of Connecticut State Seal on inner face of pylons.	CT-82
2144	Five Mile River	MP 14.87, New Canaan 41.1247°N 73.4713°W	1937 (reconstructed 1975)		Not on NRHP.	
715	New Canaan Avenue (Route 123)	MP 15.87, Norwalk 41.1337°N 73.4568°W	1937 (reconstructed 1995)	Late Gothic Revival. Rigid frame steel span between concrete abutments, 45 ft (14 m).	Triangular pylons with inset tracery panels; balustrade has low pointed arches between square posts. Shield on inner face of pylons.	CT-87
717	Silvermine Avenue	MP 16.75, Norwalk 41.1387°N 73.4408°W	1938	Moderne. Concrete, segmental arch on piers.	Stepped pylons and simple balustrade.	CT-89
718	Silvermine River	MP 16.77, Norwalk 41.1389°N 73.4400°W	1957	Utilitarian. Simply-supported girder design.	Original 1938 bridge was destroyed during the Great Flood of 1955. Current bridge opened in 1957.	CT-121
719	Perry Avenue	MP 17.11, Norwalk 41.1405°N 73.4343°W	1936	Moderne/Modern Classicism. Concrete rigid frame bridge. Single span, round arch, 30 ft (9.1 m).	Prominent keystone. Simple balustrade. Bas-relief of Connecticut State Seal on inner face of pylons.	CT-90
6069	U.S. Route 7	MP 17.28, Norwalk 41.1415°N 73.4310°W	1991	Utilitarian. Concrete abutments with straight steel span.	Not on NRHP.	
720	Metro-North Railroad bridge	MP 17.46, Norwalk 41.1422°N 73.4280°W	1937	Utilitarian. Concrete skew span, 37 ft (11 m).	Segmental arch on piers with wing walls.	CT-91
721	Norwalk River	MP 17.51, Norwalk 41.1424°N 73.4269°W	1938 (reconstructed 1988)	Utilitarian. Concrete triple-arch bridge, 86 ft (26 m).	Rounded arches with buttressed center pier.	CT-92
530	Main Avenue (SR 719)	MP 17.58, Norwalk 41.1426°N 73.4257°W	1938	Classical Revival/Rustic. Concrete rigid frame bridge. Twin single spans, segmental arches on piers, 62 ft (19 m).	Random rubble facing with rock-faced granite voussoirs, quoins, and coping.	CT-93
725	Chestnut Hill Road (Route 53)	MP 19.56, Norwalk 41.1585°N 73.3947°W	1937	Concrete, simple balustrade.		CT-97
727/5763	Wilton Road (Route 33)	MP 20.64, Westport 41.1638°N 73.3758°W	1989	Modern Classicism. Concrete T-beam bridge, 52 ft (16 m).	Original 1935 bridge replaced. Wing walls with plain coping. Simple pylons and balustrade.	CT-39
728	Saugatuck River	MP 21.07, Westport 41.1635°N 73.3672°W	1938 (reconstructed 1990)	Moderne/Modern Classicism. Steel arch span.	Rebuilt parapet has incised lines resembling drafted masonry, small piers carrying metal railing.	CT-99
730	Weston Road (Route 57)	MP 21.57, Westport 41.1640°N 73.358°W	1938 (reconstructed 1994)	Moderne. Rigid frame concrete bridge, 48 ft (15 m). Single skew span, segmental arch on piers.	Simple forms with crenellated parapet.	CT-101
731	Easton Road (Route 136)	MP 21.74, Westport 41.1649°N 73.3547°W	1938 (reconstructed 1994)	Moderne. Structural steel rigid frame bridge, 60 ft (18 m). Single span, segmental arch on piers and wing walls.	Piers, wing walls and concrete facing of span have bold incised lines suggesting drafted masonry. Solid parapet.	CT-102
733	Bayberry Lane	MP 23.08, Westport 41.1716°N 73.3310°W	1939	Moderne. Concrete, elliptical arch.	Balustrade with flat posts bearing pyramidal raised panels.	CT-104
734	Cross Highway	MP 23.58, Fairfield 41.1741°N 73.3220°W	1938	Moderne. Concrete rigid frame. Single span, round arch, 36 ft (11 m).	Built-up pylons have inset panels with naturalistic bas-relief flowers. Pierced parapet.	CT-105
738	Hillside Road	MP 25.44, Fairfield 41.1915°N 73.2953°W	1940	Moderne.	Concrete parapet with simple balustrade.	CT-109
740	Black Rock Turnpike (Route 58)	MP 27.03, Fairfield 41.2029°N 73.2704°W	1938	Moderne. Concrete, rigid frame bridge. Single span, segmental arch on piers, 61 ft (19 m).		CT-111
741	Cricker Brook	MP 27.09, Fairfield 41.2036°N 73.2699°W	1940		Minor structure.	CT-112
743	Mill River	MP 28.05, Fairfield 41.2148°N 73.2594°W	1940	Utilitarian. Concrete, segmental arch	No parapet or balustrade.	CT-114
750	Reservoir Avenue	MP 31.89, Trumbull 41.2349°N 73.1958°W	1939	Moderne/Modern Classicism. Concrete rigid frame bridge. Single span, segmental arch on piers.	Greek-key molding and balustrade with chamfered posts.	CT-120
752	Pequonnock River	MP 32.43, Trumbull 41.2364°N 73.1859°W	1993		Original 1935 bridge replaced.	CT-57
753	White Plains Road (Route 127)	MP 32.75, Trumbull 41.2372°N 73.1794°W	1934 (reconstructed 1990)	Moderne. Concrete rigid frame, single span segmental arch.	Built-up pylons. Simple balustrade.	CT-122
754	Unity Road	MP 33.03, Trumbull 41.237°N 73.1743°W	1940 (reconstructed 1997)	Moderne. Steel span with concrete abutments.	Railing of horizontal strips with decorative posts and curling inserts.	CT-123
NA	Huntington Turnpike (Route 108),	MP 33.73, Trumbull 41.2379°N 73.1613°W	1940 (demolished 1979)			CT-124
5256; 5257	Route 8	MP 34.11, Trumbull 41.2372°N 73.1535°W	1983	Utilitarian. Concrete abutments with straight steel beam span.	Two separate bridges. Original 1940 bridge spanning the Merritt Parkway demolished 1979. Current bridge not on NRHP.	
756	Huntington Road	MP 34.84, Stratford 41.2371°N 73.1399°W	1940	Moderne. Concrete, single span, segmental arch on piers.	Faceted quoins adorn pylons and solid parapet.	CT-126
757	Cutspring Road	MP 35.34, Stratford 41.2381°N 73.1305°W	1940	Moderne. Concrete, single span, segmental arch.	Solid panel of white concrete at center of balustrade.	CT-127
758	Pumpkin Brook	MP 35.57, Stratford 41.2388°N 73.1264°W	1941		Minor structure.	CT-128
760	Main Street (Route 110)	MP 36.87, Stratford 41.2452°N 73.1026°W	1940 (reconstructed 1997)	Art Deco. Concrete abutments, metal span and railing. Single span, segmental arch on piers.	Stripes of different-colored concrete continue lines of arch onto abutments. Giant sheet metal cut-outs of flowers and leaves ornament spandrels.	CT-130

== Bridge drawings ==
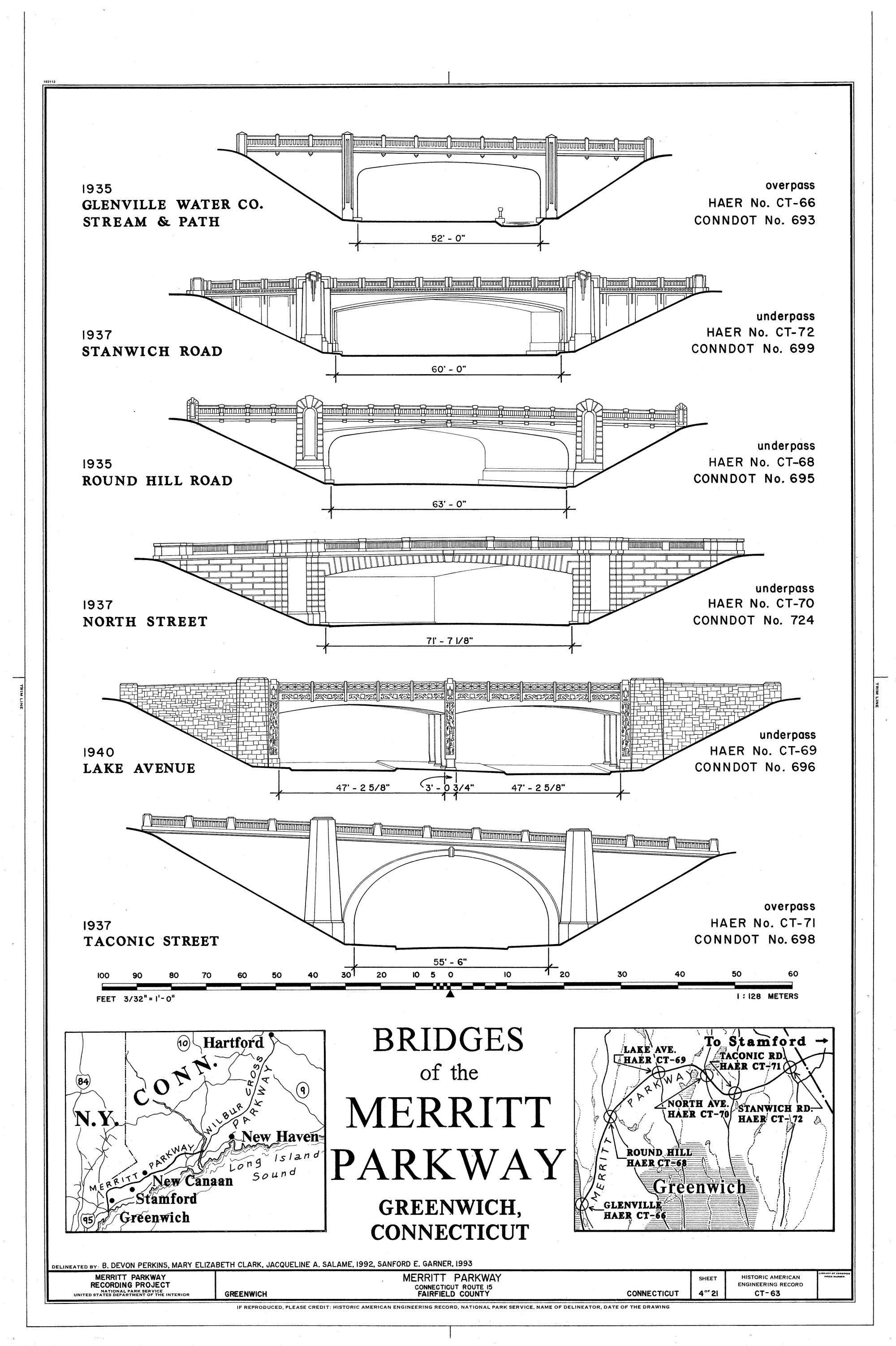
Bridge drawing (Greenwich)

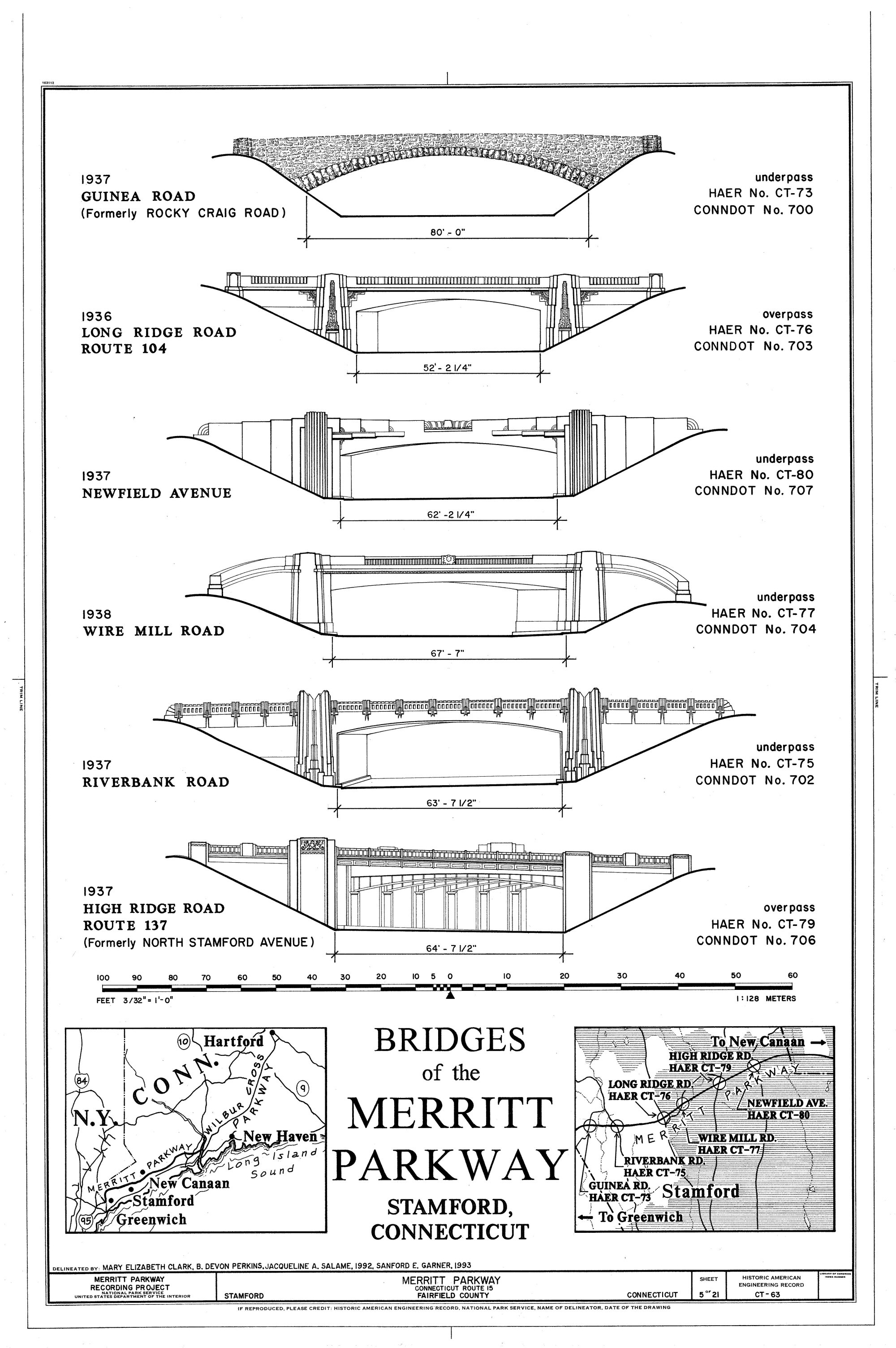
Bridge drawing (Stamford)

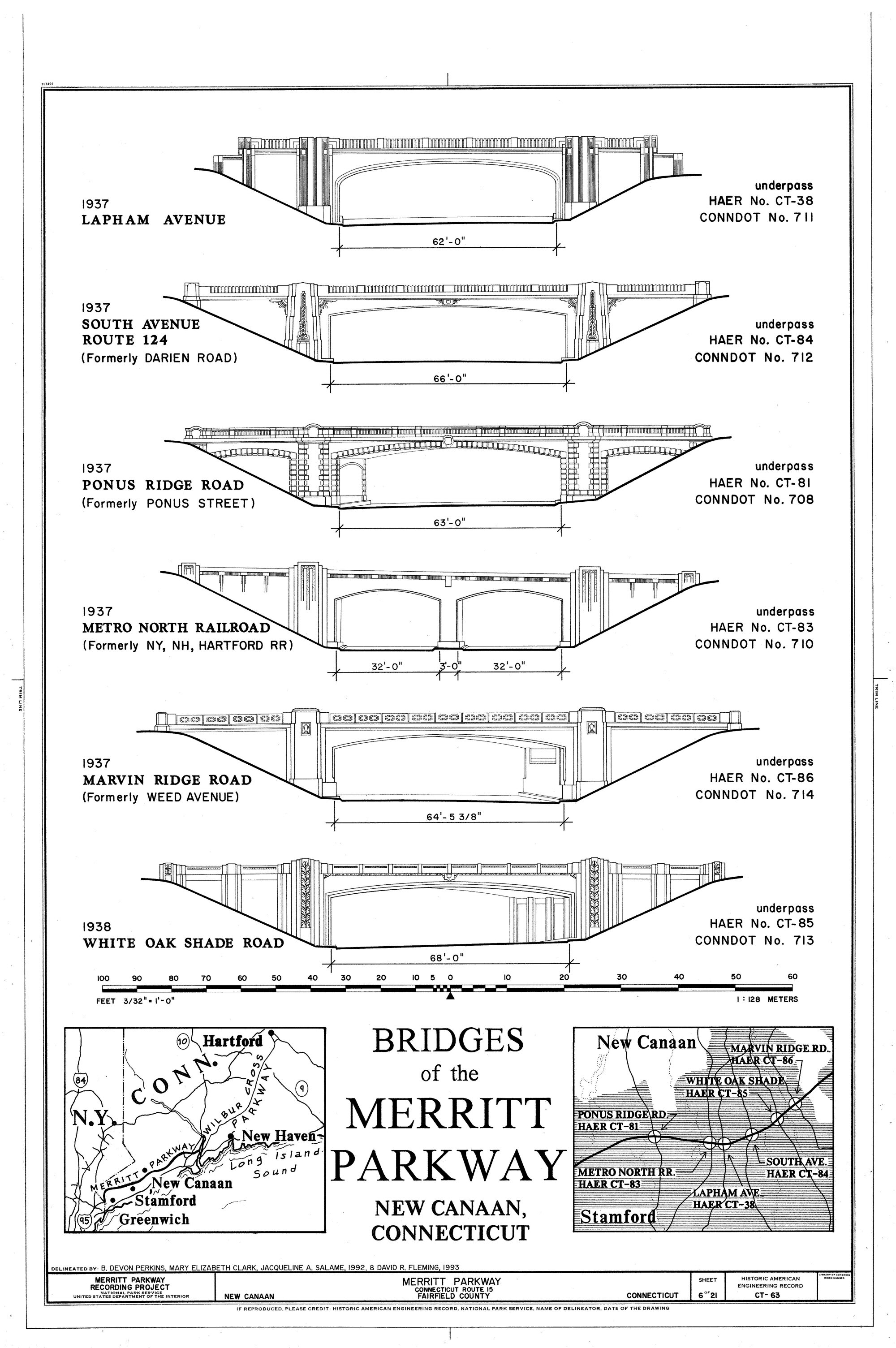
Bridge drawing (New Canaan)

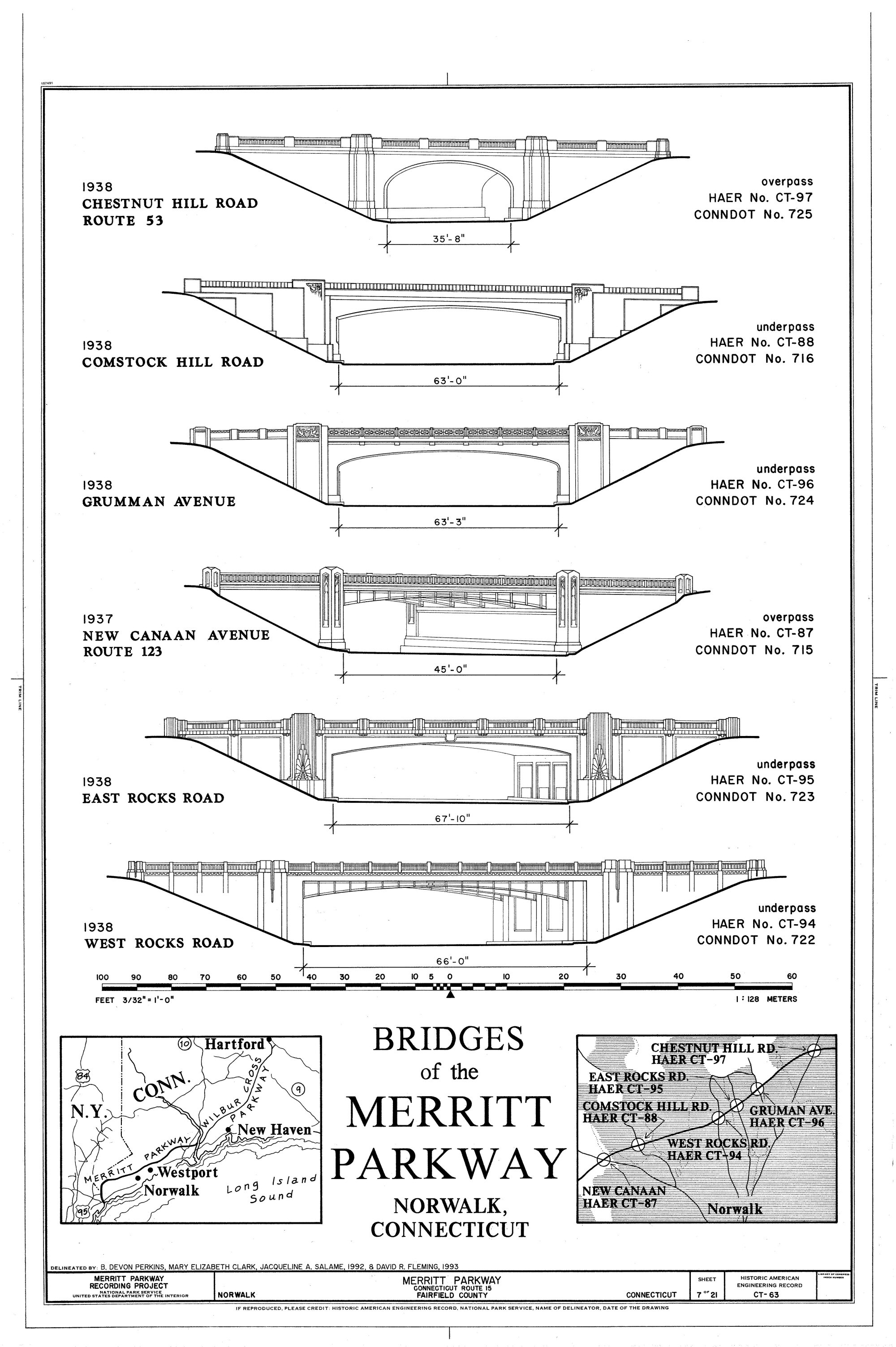
Bridge drawing (Norwalk)

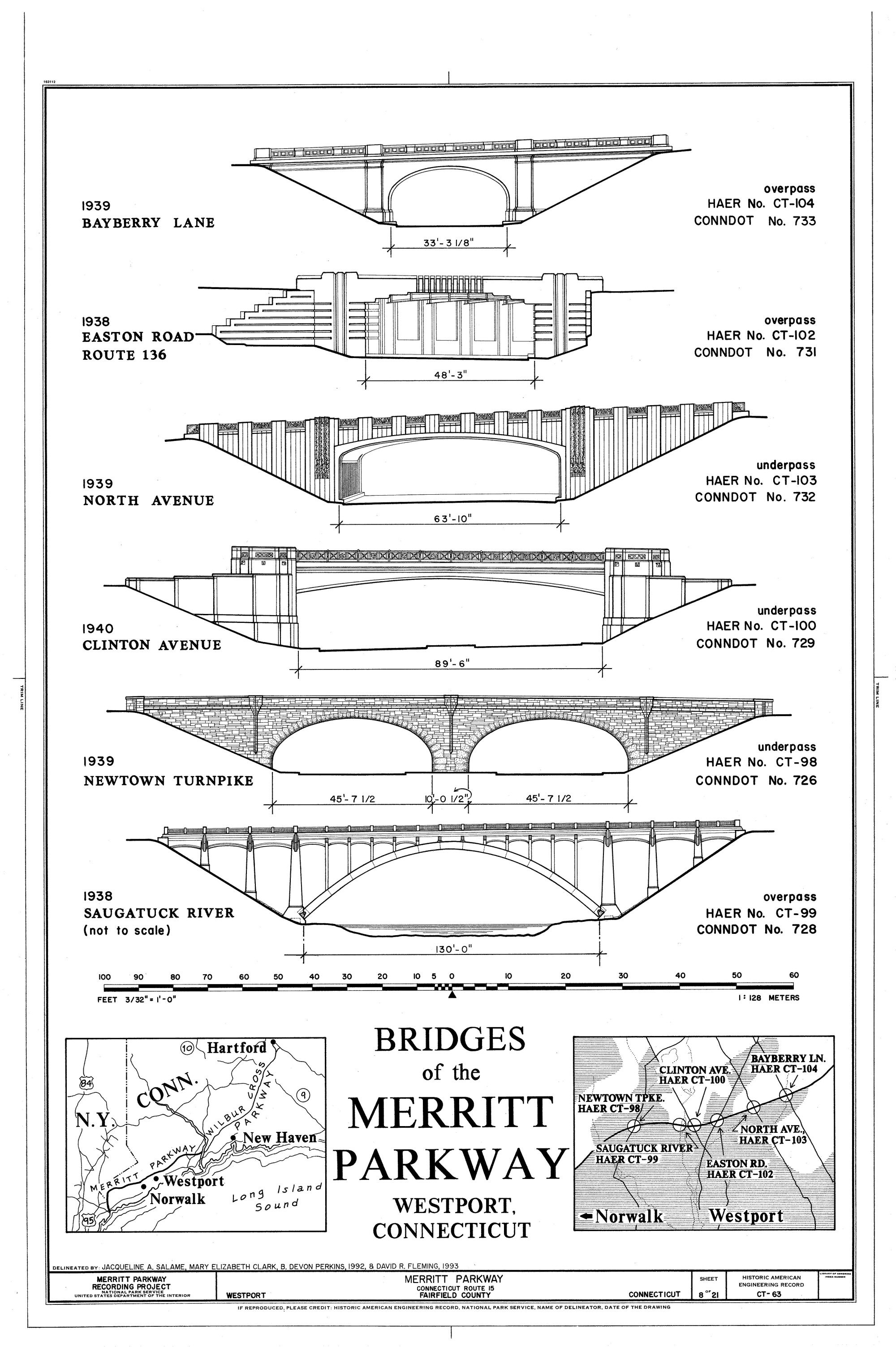
Bridge drawing (Westport)

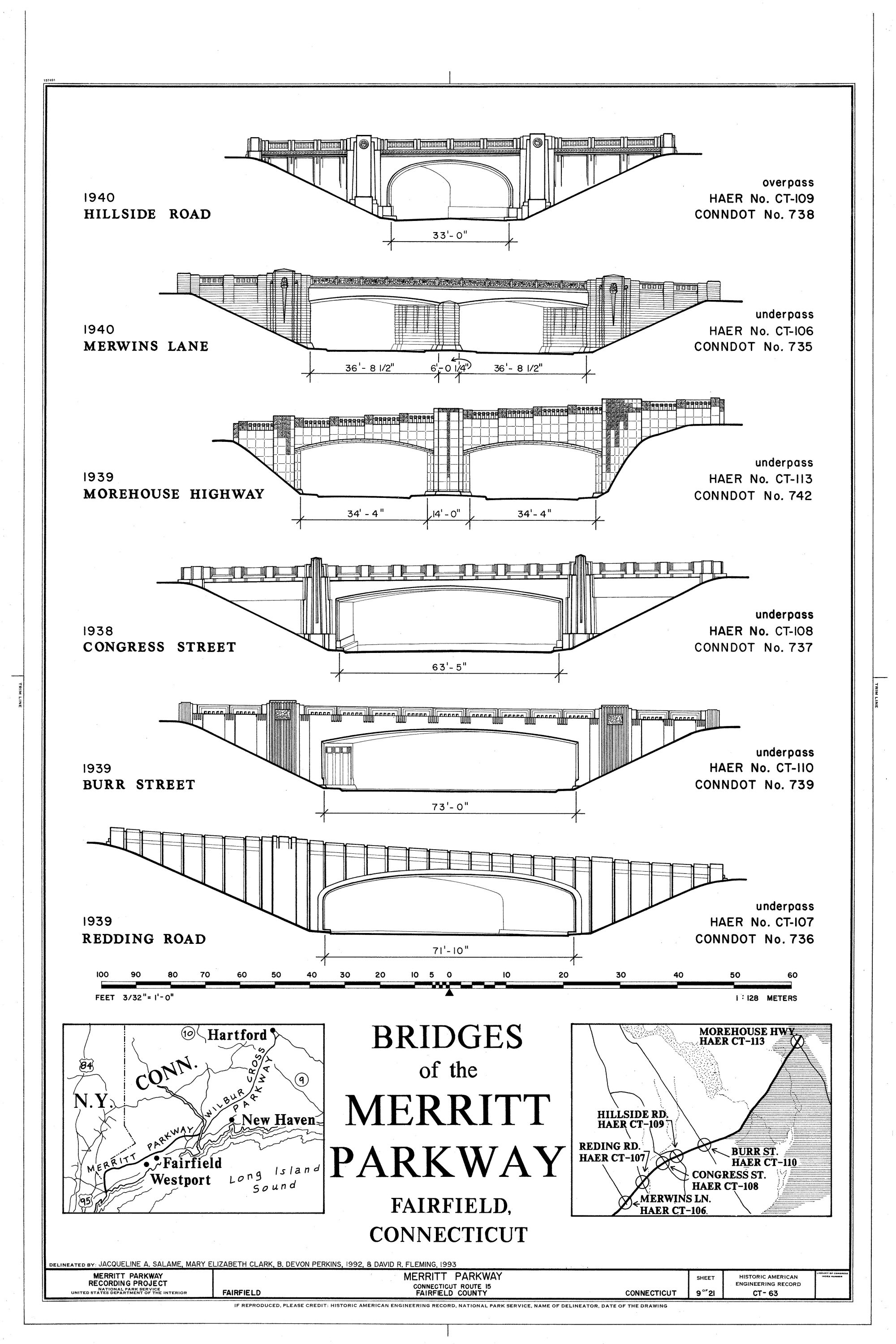
Bridge drawing (Fairfield)

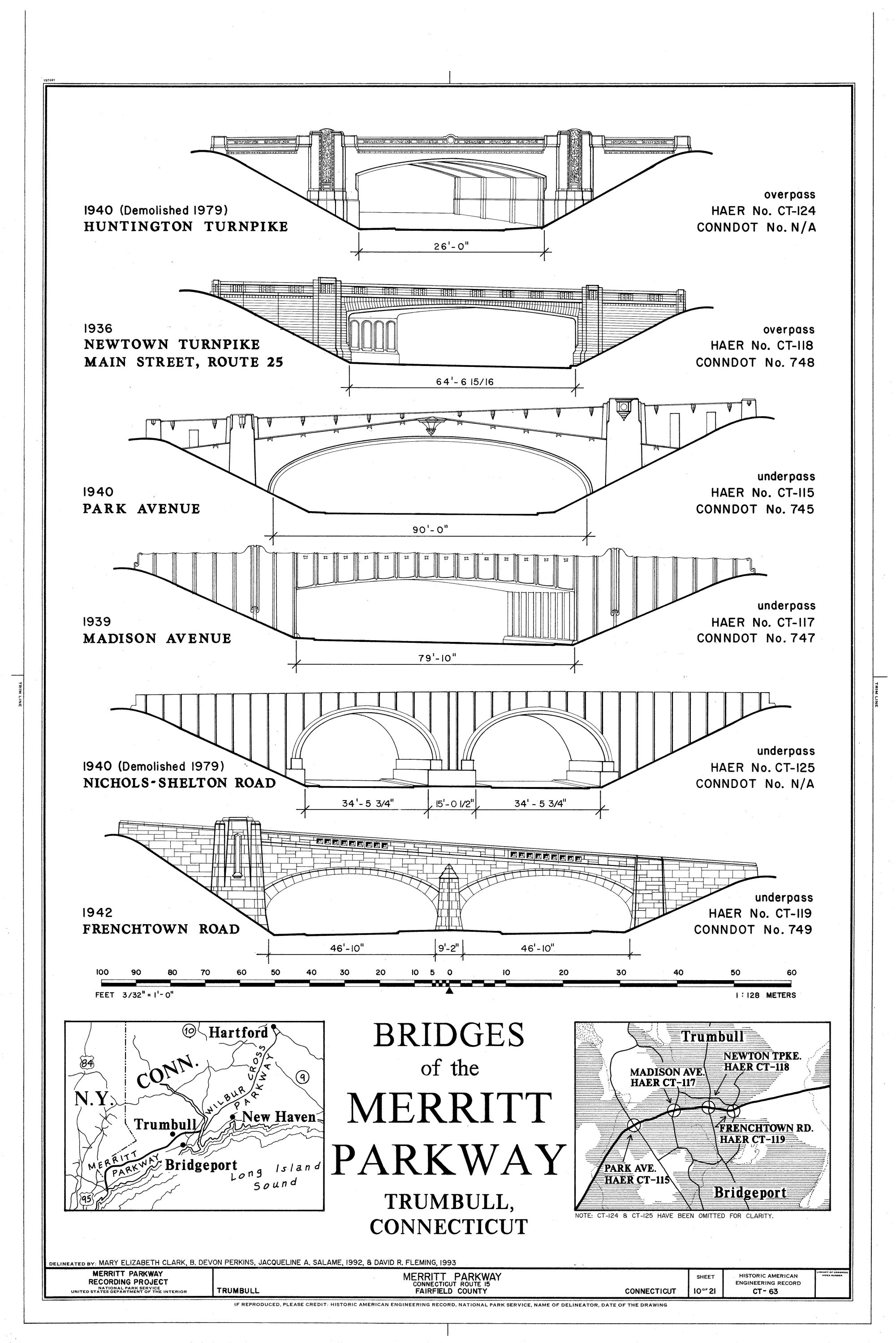
Bridge drawing (Trumbull)

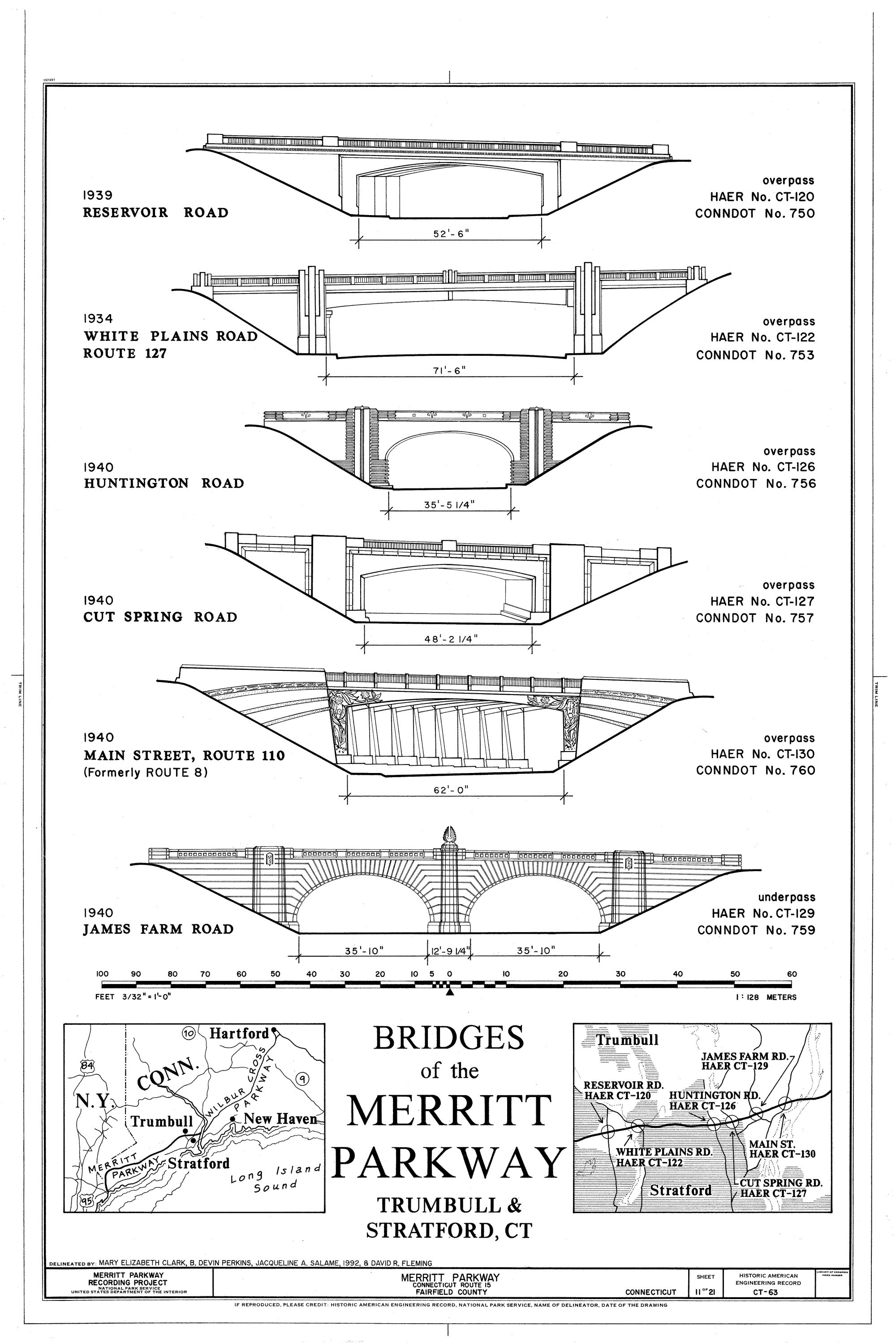
Bridge drawing (Stratford)

== See also ==
- List of bridges documented by the Historic American Engineering Record in Connecticut
