= Griswold =

Griswold may refer to:

== People and fictional characters ==
- Griswold (surname), a list of people and fictional characters
- Griswold family, an American political family
- J. Griswold Webb (1890–1934), American politician

== Places ==
=== Canada ===
- Griswold, Manitoba
- Griswold Pass, British Columbia, a mountain pass

=== United States ===
- Griswold, Connecticut, a town
- Griswold, Iowa, a city
- Griswold, Missouri, an unincorporated community
- Griswold, New York, a hamlet in the town of Arkwright
- Griswold Street, Detroit, Michigan
- Fort Griswold, Groton, Connecticut
- Griswold Lake (Nevada)
- Griswold Creek, California
- Griswold Hills, California, United States, a mountain range
- Griswold Scout Reservation, New Hampshire

== Military ==
- USS Griswold (DE-7), a World War II US Navy ship
- Media (AK-83), a World War II ship transferred to the US Army and renamed Glenn Gerald Griswold
- Griswold (revolver), produced for Confederate forces during the American Civil War

== Businesses ==
- Griswold Manufacturing, an American manufacturer of cast iron home products based in Erie, Pennsylvania, that operated from 1865 until 1957
- Griswold Signal Company, a manufacturer of traffic signals and railroad grade crossing signals based in Minneapolis, Minnesota
- The Griswold Inn, the oldest continuously run tavern in the United States, located in Essex, Connecticut

== Other uses ==
- Griswold v. Connecticut, widely known as "Griswold", a landmark 1965 US Supreme Court case invalidating laws prohibiting the use of contraception
- Griswold Airport, Madison, Connecticut
- Griswold (automobile), manufactured in Detroit in 1907
- Griswold High School (disambiguation)
- Griswold Stadium, Portland, Oregon, United States, a football and soccer stadium for Lewis & Clark College
- Griswold Building, original name of The Albert (Detroit), a former office building on the National Register of Historic Places
- Griswold House (disambiguation)
- The Griswolds, an Australian two-piece indie rock band

== See also ==
- Anderson v. Griswold, 2023 Colorado Supreme Court case rejecting the presidential eligibility of Donald Trump
- Hepburn v. Griswold, 1870 US Supreme Court case declaring certain parts of the legal tender acts unconstitutional
