= National Register of Historic Places listings in Windham County, Connecticut =

Location of Windham County in Connecticut

This is a list of the National Register of Historic Places listings in Windham County, Connecticut.

This is intended to be a complete list of the properties and districts on the National Register of Historic Places in Windham County, Connecticut, United States. The locations of National Register properties and districts for which the latitude and longitude coordinates are included below, may be seen in an online map.

There are 86 properties and districts listed on the National Register in the county, including 3 National Historic Landmarks.

Contents: Counties and municipalities in Connecticut

Fairfield (city of Bridgeport | town of Greenwich | city of Stamford) | Hartford (city of Hartford | town of Southington | town of West Hartford | town of Windsor) | Litchfield | Middlesex (city of Middletown) | New Haven (city of New Haven) | New London | Tolland | Windham

This National Park Service list is complete through NPS recent listings posted September 11, 2026.

== Current listings ==
	Name on the Register	Image	Date listed	Location	City or town	Description
1	Abington Congregational Church	Abington Congregational Church	September 19, 1977 (#77001413)	CT 97; 41°51′27″N 72°00′29″W	Pomfret	
2	Aldrich Free Public Library	Aldrich Free Public Library	July 27, 1994 (#94000768)	299 Main Street; 41°43′08″N 71°52′32″W	Plainfield	
3	American Thread Company	American Thread Company	July 30, 2014 (#14000434)	322, 440, 480, 560 Main & 157 Union Streets; 41°42′39″N 72°12′19″W	Windham	In the Willimantic section of Windham
4	Ashford Academy	Ashford Academy	December 29, 1988 (#88002649)	Fitts Road; 41°52′22″N 72°07′25″W	Ashford	
5	Benjamin Bosworth House	Benjamin Bosworth House	February 17, 1978 (#78002857)	John Perry Road; 41°53′59″N 72°05′03″W	Eastford	
6	Henry C. Bowen House	Henry C. Bowen House	August 24, 1977 (#77001414)	519 CT 169; 41°56′57″N 71°58′37″W	Woodstock	Gothic revival summer cottage visited by three U.S. presidents. Also known as Roseland Cottage.
7	Mathew Bowen Homestead	Mathew Bowen Homestead	September 10, 1987 (#87000859)	94 Plaine Hill Road; 41°56′33″N 71°58′25″W	Woodstock	Now the Inn at Woodstock.
8	Brayton Grist Mill	Brayton Grist Mill	June 13, 1986 (#86001257)	U.S. Route 44; 41°51′39″N 71°58′57″W	Pomfret	At the entrance to Mashamoquet Brook State Park
9	Broad Street – Davis Park Historic District	Broad Street – Davis Park Historic District	December 31, 1998 (#98001556)	Roughly along Broad Street from Dorrane Street to Winter Street; 41°48′27″N 71°52′50″W	Killingly	
10	Brooklyn Green Historic District	Brooklyn Green Historic District	September 23, 1982 (#82004401)	CT 169, 205, and US 6, Wolf Den, Brown, Prince Hill, and Hyde Roads; 41°47′18″N 71°56′57″W	Brooklyn	
11	Bush Hill Historic District	Bush Hill Historic District	February 10, 1987 (#87000012)	Parts of Bush Hill Road, CT 169, and Wolf Den Road; 41°48′43″N 71°57′52″W	Brooklyn	
12	Butts Bridge	Butts Bridge	May 24, 2010 (#10000272)	Butts Bridge Road over Quinebaug River; 41°39′05″N 71°58′15″W	Canterbury	
13	Cady-Copp House	Cady-Copp House	September 3, 2001 (#01000939)	115 Liberty Highway; 41°53′27″N 71°51′56″W	Putnam	
14	Canterbury Center Historic District	Canterbury Center Historic District	April 10, 1998 (#97001446)	Roughly along Elmdale, Library, North Canterbury, South Canterbury, and Westminster Roads; 41°42′06″N 71°58′22″W	Canterbury	
15	Cargill Falls Mill (Wilkinson Mill)	Cargill Falls Mill (Wilkinson Mill)	July 29, 2014 (#14000435)	52-58 Pomfret Street; 41°54′54″N 71°54′42″W	Putnam	
16	Central Village Historic District	Central Village Historic District	August 9, 1991 (#91000949)	Roughly, School, Main and Water Streets, and Putnam Road, North to Plainfield High School; 41°43′06″N 71°54′21″W	Plainfield	
17	Capt. Seth Chandler House	Capt. Seth Chandler House	December 15, 1993 (#93001380)	55 Converse Street; 42°00′49″N 71°58′07″W	Woodstock	
18	Chaplin Historic District	Chaplin Historic District	October 11, 1978 (#78002856)	Chaplin Street; 41°47′38″N 72°07′40″W	Chaplin	
19	Church Farm	Church Farm	November 17, 1988 (#88002650)	396 Mansfield Road; 41°50′21″N 72°10′11″W	Ashford	Now the Church Center of Eastern Connecticut State University.
20	Capt. John Clark House	Capt. John Clark House	October 6, 1970 (#70000699)	Route 169, South of Canterbury; 41°39′46″N 71°58′25″W	Canterbury	
21	Prudence Crandall House	Prudence Crandall House	October 22, 1970 (#70000696)	1 South Canterbury Road; 41°41′52″N 71°58′19″W	Canterbury	Site of Prudence Crandall's Canterbury Female Boarding School, which in 1833–1834 offered schooling to black girls. Forced to close by fierce town resistance, culminating in violence. Crandall, now Connecticut's state heroine, left Connecticut immediately, never to return.
22	Daniel's Village Archeological Site	Daniel's Village Archeological Site	March 30, 1978 (#78002861)	north side of Five Mile River near Stone Road; 41°52′58″N 71°51′03″W	Killingly	
23	Danielson Main Street Historic District	Danielson Main Street Historic District	April 8, 1992 (#92000265)	Main Street from Water Street to Spring Street; 41°48′18″N 71°53′04″W	Killingly	
24	Dayville Historic District	Dayville Historic District	August 25, 1988 (#88001422)	Main and Pleasant Streets; 41°50′45″N 71°53′08″W	Killingly	
25	Dorrance Inn	Dorrance Inn	August 23, 2002 (#02000867)	748 Plainfield Pike; 41°41′28″N 71°50′48″W	Sterling	
26	Elliottville Lower Mill	Elliottville Lower Mill	April 15, 1982 (#82004406)	Peep Toad Road; 41°50′21″N 71°50′33″W	Killingly	
27	First Congregational Church of Plainfield	First Congregational Church of Plainfield	July 31, 1986 (#86002116)	519 Norwich Road; 41°41′06″N 71°54′55″W	Plainfield	
28	Forty-Seventh Camp of Rochambeau's Army	Forty-Seventh Camp of Rochambeau's Army	January 23, 2003 (#02001732)	Scotland Road; 41°42′09″N 72°09′00″W	Windham	
29	Fourth Camp of Rochambeau's Army	Fourth Camp of Rochambeau's Army	January 8, 2003 (#02001680)	Plains Road near Lovers Lane; 41°42′00″N 72°10′52″W	Windham	
30	Glen Falls Bridge	Glen Falls Bridge	April 1, 1999 (#99000408)	Brunswick Avenue over the Moosup River; 41°43′01″N 71°51′43″W	Plainfield	
31	Gwyn Careg	Gwyn Careg	April 8, 1994 (#94000336)	68 Wolf Den Road; 41°51′20″N 71°59′52″W	Pomfret	
32	Hampton Hill Historic District	Hampton Hill Historic District	September 23, 1982 (#82004408)	Main Street, Old Route 6, Cedar Swamp Road. 41°46′57″N 72°03′19″W	Hampton	
33	Hemlock Glen Industrial Archeological District	Hemlock Glen Industrial Archeological District	June 5, 2007 (#07000508)	Address Restricted	Hampton	
34	Dr. Chester Hunt Office	Dr. Chester Hunt Office	October 6, 1970 (#70000708)	Windham Center Road; 41°42′00″N 72°09′30″W	Windham	
35	Samuel Huntington Birthplace	Samuel Huntington Birthplace	November 11, 1971 (#71001009)	CT 14, 2 mi (3.2 km) west of CT 97; 41°41′57″N 72°05′10″W	Scotland	Boyhood saltbox home of the American statesman, a signer of the Declaration of Independence, Governor of Connecticut and first presiding officer of the Congress of the Confederation
36	Israel Putnam School	Israel Putnam School	December 13, 1984 (#84000788)	97 School Street; 41°54′57″N 71°54′23″W	Putnam	
37	William Jillson Stone House	William Jillson Stone House	August 5, 1971 (#71000912)	561 Main Street; 41°42′40″N 72°12′38″W	Windham	In the Willimantic section of the town
38	Old Killingly High School	Old Killingly High School	March 26, 1992 (#92000266)	185 Broad Street; 41°48′13″N 71°53′08″W	Killingly	
39	Knowlton Memorial Hall	Knowlton Memorial Hall	March 17, 1994 (#94000252)	5 Town Hall Road; 41°51′49″N 72°09′42″W	Ashford	
40	Lawton Mills Historic District	Lawton Mills Historic District	February 16, 1996 (#96000028)	Roughly bounded by 2nd Street, Railroad Avenue, Norwich Road, and 5th and 9th Streets; 41°40′32″N 71°55′13″W	Plainfield	
41	Main Street Historic District	Main Street Historic District	June 28, 1982 (#82004410)	21-65 Church Street, 667-1009 Main Street, 24-28 North Street, and 20-22 Walnut Street; also 32, 50, and 54 North Street; 41°42′44″N 72°12′54″W	Windham	In the Willimantic section of the town. Second set of boundaries represents a boundary increase of July 29, 1992
42	Mansfield Hollow Dam	Mansfield Hollow Dam	April 12, 2009 (#03000194)	141 Mansfield Hollow Road; 41°45′20″N 72°10′54″W	Windham	Extends into Tolland County
43	March Route of Rochambeau's Army: Manship Road-Barstow Road	March Route of Rochambeau's Army: Manship Road-Barstow Road	January 8, 2003 (#02001678)	Manship Road, Barstow Road from its Junction with Manship Road to Westminster Road; 41°42′07″N 72°00′13″W	Canterbury	
44	March Route of Rochambeau's Army: Old Canterbury Road	March Route of Rochambeau's Army: Old Canterbury Road	June 6, 2003 (#03000310)	Old Canterbury Road: Canterbury Road from its Junction with Old Canterbury Road; 41°41′22″N 71°57′04″W	Plainfield	
45	March Route of Rochambeau's Army: Palmer Road	March Route of Rochambeau's Army: Palmer Road	June 6, 2003 (#03000311)	Palmer Road, from Intersection with Miller Road to East of its Junction with Pudding Hill Road; 41°41′57″N 72°03′47″W	Scotland	
46	March Route of Rochambeau's Army: Plainfield Pike	March Route of Rochambeau's Army: Plainfield Pike	June 6, 2003 (#03000312)	Plainfield Pike from Intersection with Industrial Drive. East to its Junction with Ledge Hill Road; 41°40′55″N 71°53′53″W	Plainfield	
47	March Route of Rochambeau's Army: Scotland Road	March Route of Rochambeau's Army: Scotland Road	June 6, 2003 (#03000314)	Scotland Road, from Intersection with Back Road to 80 Scotland Road; 41°42′03″N 72°08′43″W	Windham	
48	Mixer Tavern	Mixer Tavern	March 17, 1994 (#94000253)	14 Westford Road; 41°51′56″N 72°09′33″W	Ashford	
49	Natchaug Forest Lumber Shed	Natchaug Forest Lumber Shed	September 4, 1986 (#86001732)	Kingsbury Road, Natchaug State Forest; 41°50′21″N 72°05′04″W	Eastford	
50	New Roxbury Ironworks Site		February 23, 1996 (#96000130)	Address Restricted	Woodstock	
51	George Pickering Nichols House	George Pickering Nichols House	July 31, 1991 (#91000990)	42 Thompson Road; 41°56′51″N 71°53′04″W	Thompson	
52	North Grosvenordale Mill Historic District	North Grosvenordale Mill Historic District	April 16, 1993 (#93000288)	Riverside Drive (CT 12), Buckley Hill Road, Floral Avenue, Market Lane, and Marshall, Central, River, and Holmes Streets; 41°59′09″N 71°53′53″W	Thompson	
53	Old Westfield Cemetery	Old Westfield Cemetery	August 26, 2010 (#10000578)	320 North Street; 41°49′08″N 71°53′21″W	Killingly	
54	Packerville Bridge	Packerville Bridge	November 27, 1992 (#92001565)	Packerville Road over Mill Brook; 41°40′01″N 71°56′56″W	Plainfield	
55	Plainfield Street Historic District	Plainfield Street Historic District	April 11, 1991 (#91000350)	Roughly Norwich Road from Railroad Avenue to Academy Hill Road; 41°41′09″N 71°54′54″W	Plainfield	
56	Plainfield Woolen Company Mill	Plainfield Woolen Company Mill	August 29, 1985 (#85001919)	Main Street; 41°43′11″N 71°54′25″W	Plainfield	
57	Pomfret Street Historic District	Pomfret Street Historic District	April 23, 1998 (#98000372)	Roughly along Pomfret Street and CT 169, from Bradley Road to Woodstock Road; 41°53′19″N 71°57′51″W	Pomfret	
58	Pomfret Town House	Pomfret Town House	January 19, 1989 (#88003221)	17 Town House Road; 41°51′53″N 71°57′50″W	Pomfret	Home to the local historical society.
59	Prospect Hill Historic District	Prospect Hill Historic District	August 29, 2003 (#03000814)	Roughly bounded by Bolivia Street, Jackson Street, Valley Street and Birch Street; 41°43′09″N 72°12′12″W	Windham	In the Willimantic section of the town
60	Putnam Farm	Putnam Farm	March 11, 1982 (#82004399)	Spaulding Road; 41°49′24″N 71°57′03″W	Brooklyn	
61	Putnam High School	Putnam High School	December 10, 1993 (#93001343)	126 Church Street; 41°55′06″N 71°54′47″W	Putnam	Putnam's first high school, now Putnam Town Hall.
62	Putnam Railroad Station	Putnam Railroad Station	July 24, 2007 (#07000742)	35 and 45-47 Main Street; 41°54′51″N 71°54′30″W	Putnam	
63	Israel Putnam Wolf Den	Israel Putnam Wolf Den	May 2, 1985 (#85000949)	Off Wolf Den Road in Mashamoquet Brook State Park; 41°50′36″N 71°59′04″W	Pomfret	
64	Quinebaug Mill-Quebec Square Historic District	Quinebaug Mill-Quebec Square Historic District	August 29, 1985 (#85001921)	Roughly bounded by the Quinebaug River, Quebec Square, and Elm and South Main Streets; 41°47′54″N 71°53′21″W	Brooklyn and Killingly	
65	Quinebaug River Prehistoric Archeological District	Quinebaug River Prehistoric Archeological District	September 7, 2009 (#09000696)	Between Connecticut Route 169 and the Quinebaug River; 41°40′24″N 71°57′26″W	Canterbury	
66	Hezekiah S. Ramsdell Farm	Hezekiah S. Ramsdell Farm	August 23, 1990 (#90000442)	Ramsdell Road; 41°57′07″N 71°54′39″W	Thompson	
67	Sterling Hill Historic District	Sterling Hill Historic District	February 6, 1986 (#86000152)	Green Lane and CT 14A; 41°41′23″N 71°50′56″W	Plainfield and Sterling	
68	Sumner-Carpenter House	Sumner-Carpenter House	December 26, 1991 (#91001854)	333 Old Colony Road; 41°54′11″N 72°04′01″W	Eastford	
69	Taylor's Corner	Taylor's Corner	January 19, 1989 (#88003220)	Route 171; 41°56′57″N 72°00′43″W	Woodstock	
70	Temple Beth Israel	Temple Beth Israel	April 16, 2013 (#13000162)	39 Killingly Drive; 41°48′14″N 71°52′40″W	Killingly	
71	Thompson Hill Historic District	Thompson Hill Historic District	December 31, 1987 (#87002186)	Chase and Quaddick Roads and CT 193 and CT 200; 41°57′27″N 71°52′06″W	Thompson	
72	Trinity Church	Trinity Church	October 15, 1970 (#70000703)	Church Street; 41°48′00″N 71°55′28″W	Brooklyn	
73	Union Society of Phoenixville House	Union Society of Phoenixville House	December 11, 2007 (#07001247)	4 Hartford Turnpike; 41°52′37″N 72°05′12″W	Eastford	
74	Unitarian Meetinghouse	Unitarian Meetinghouse	November 9, 1972 (#72001335)	Junction of CT 169 and US 6; 41°47′16″N 71°57′01″W	Brooklyn	
75	Isaac and Sarah Upham House		August 12, 2025 (#100012114)	51 Quinebaug Road; 41°59′46″N 71°54′03″W	Thompson	
76	Edward Waldo House	Edward Waldo House	November 21, 1978 (#78002879)	South of Scotland on Waldo Road; 41°39′33″N 72°06′05″W	Scotland	
77	Wauregan Historic District	Wauregan Historic District	August 24, 1979 (#79003789)	Roughly bounded by CT 12, CT 205, 3rd Street, the Quinebaug River, and Chestnut Street; 41°44′38″N 71°54′38″W	Plainfield	
78	Jonathan Wheeler House	Jonathan Wheeler House	February 11, 1982 (#82004405)	North Society Road; 41°45′03″N 71°59′26″W	Canterbury	
79	Willimantic Armory	Willimantic Armory	September 12, 1985 (#85002310)	255 Pleasant Street; 41°42′35″N 72°12′54″W	Windham	In the Willimantic section of the town
80	Willimantic Elks Club	Willimantic Elks Club	September 21, 2005 (#05001045)	198 Pleasant Street; 41°42′34″N 72°12′47″W	Windham	In the Willimantic section of the town
81	Willimantic Footbridge	Willimantic Footbridge	April 19, 1979 (#79002654)	Railroad Street; 41°42′42″N 72°12′49″W	Windham	In the Willimantic section of the town
82	Willimantic Freight House and Office	Willimantic Freight House and Office	June 14, 1982 (#82004414)	Bridge Street; 41°42′44″N 72°13′15″W	Windham	In the Willimantic section of the town
83	Windham Center Historic District	Windham Center Historic District	June 4, 1979 (#79002655)	CT 14 and CT 203; 41°42′08″N 72°09′40″W	Windham	
84	Witter House	Witter House	October 6, 1970 (#70000704)	Chaplin Street; 41°47′47″N 72°07′46″W	Chaplin	
85	Woodstock Academy Classroom Building	Woodstock Academy Classroom Building	February 16, 1984 (#84001176)	Academy Road; 41°57′02″N 71°58′33″W	Woodstock	Italianate building from 1873 topped by a two-stage belltower overlooking the Woodstock Green, at one of the oldest private schools in Connecticut.
86	Woodstock Hill Historic District	Woodstock Hill Historic District	January 6, 1999 (#98001578)	Roughly along Plain Hill Road, and Academy Road, including parts of Old Hall Road and Child Hill Road; 41°57′04″N 71°58′32″W	Woodstock	

== See also ==
- List of National Historic Landmarks in Connecticut
- National Register of Historic Places listings in Connecticut
