= Lawton Mills Historic District =

Historic district in Connecticut, United States

- U.S. National Register of Historic Places
- U.S. Historic district
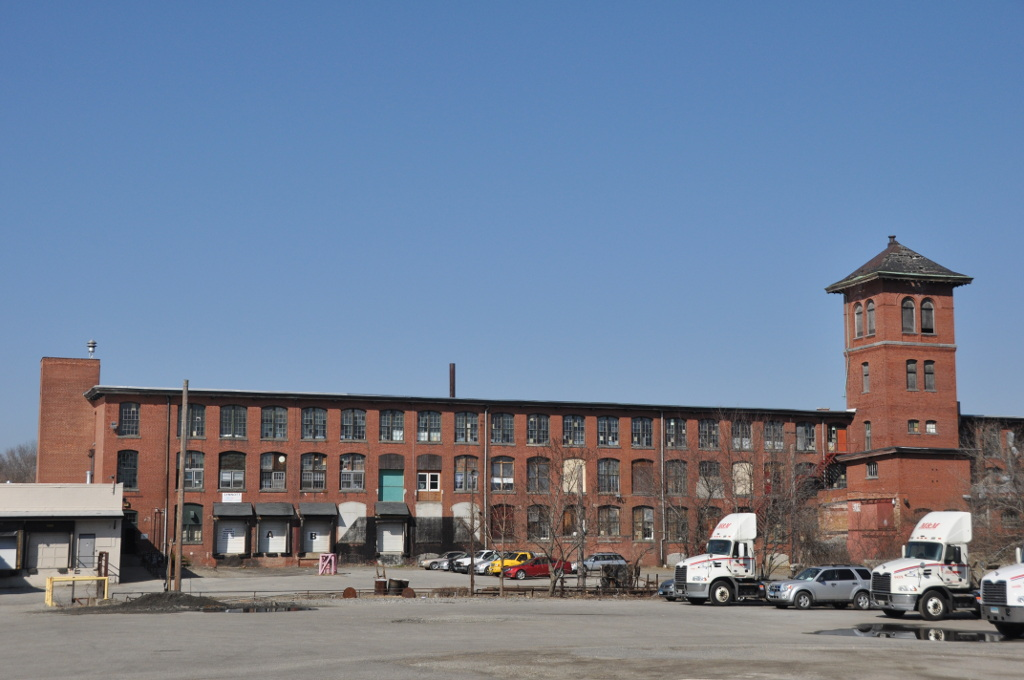

- Location within Connecticut Location within the United States
- Location: Roughly bounded by Second Street, Railroad Avenue, Norwich Road and Fifth and Ninth Streets, Plainfield, Connecticut
- Coordinates: 41°40′32″N 71°55′13″W
- Area: 140 acres (57 ha)
- Built: 1906
- Architect: Lockwood, Green; Carpenter, A.N., et al.
- Architectural style: Colonial Revival
- NRHP reference No.: 96000028
- Added to NRHP: February 16, 1996

The Lawton Mills Historic District in Plainfield, Connecticut encompasses a well-preserved early-20th-century mill village. The central focus of the district is the large brick mill complex to the south of Railroad Avenue on the banks of Horse Brook. The mill ownership developed the areas on either side of the mill complex with a substantial worker housing complex. The district includes more than 100 historically significant structures, most of which are worker house that has survived with generally only modest alterations. There are a few commercial buildings in the district, built to provide services to the works, and a community hall, which now serves as Plainfield's town hall. The district was listed on the National Register of Historic Places in 1996.

The historic district is bounded on the east by Norwich Road (Connecticut Route 12), the north by Railroad Avenue, and the west by Third Street. The complex was started in 1905 by Harold Lawton, a superintendent at the Baltic Mill complex in Sprague, and doubled in size in 1911. Originally the site of a foundry in the 19th century, Lawton's mill turned out fine combed cotton textiles, reaching a maximum capacity of 130,000 spindles and employing as many as 1,200 people. Between 1906 and 1911 Lawton built 125 Colonial Revival duplexes as housing for some of those workers. The success of the mill prompted the growth of Plainfield's commercial district, including the construction of an opera house, bank, and several large commercial blocks. The company suffered financial reverses during the Great Depression, and closed in 1936. A portion of the former mill complex has been demolished and replaced by a large modern warehouse.

== See also ==
- National Register of Historic Places listings in Windham County, Connecticut
