= Eastern Connecticut Conference =

- Conference: CIAC
- Founded: 1934
- No. of teams: 19
- Region: Windham County; New London County
- Official website: www.eccathletics.org

Locations
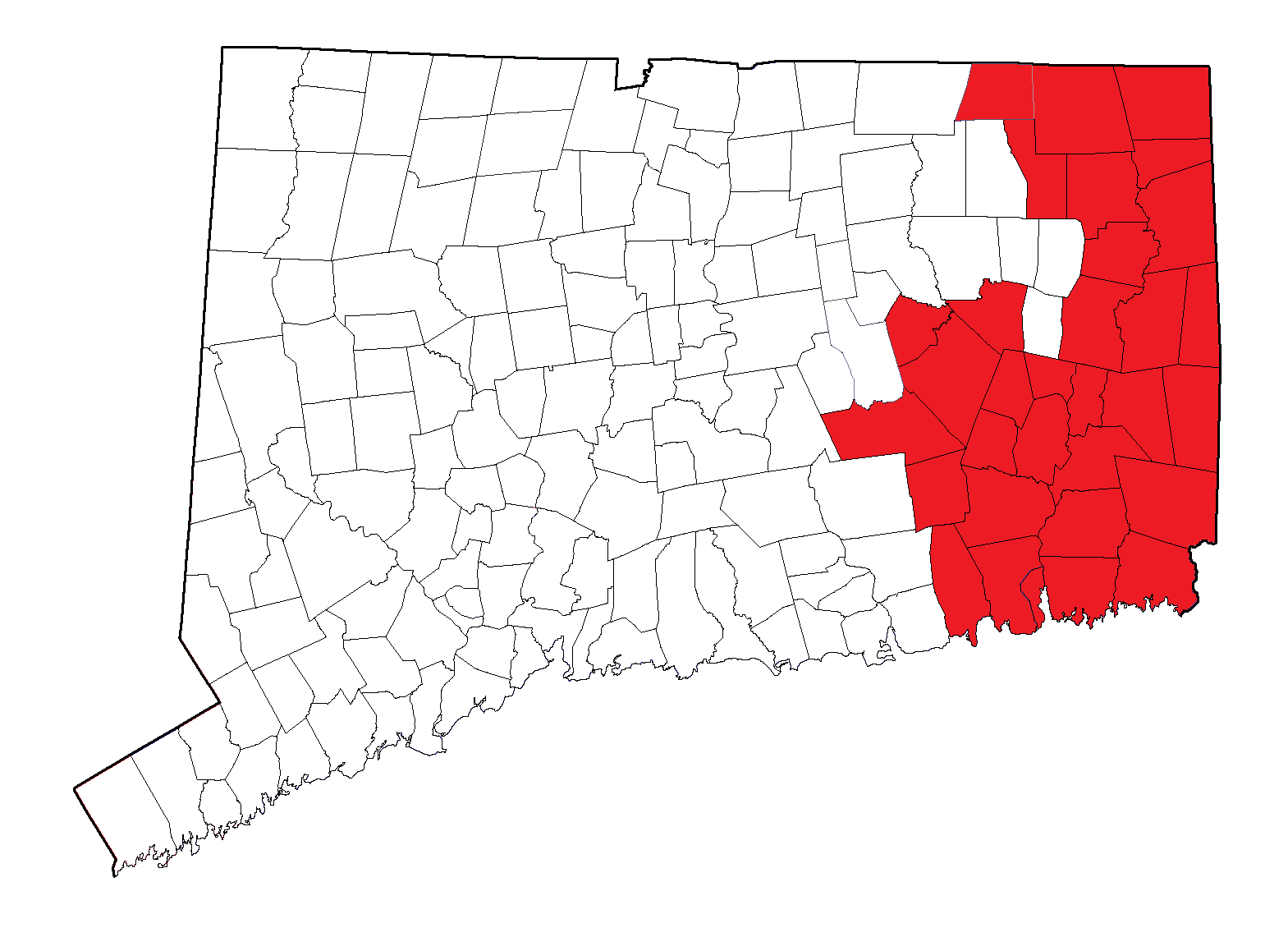

The Eastern Connecticut Conference (also known as the ECC) serves high schools in Windham County and New London County.

== History ==
In 2015 the ECC was in danger of falling apart when seven schools applied to the NCCC conference. The four large schools, Ledyard, New London, Fitch and East Lyme announced that they would be leaving the ECC and forming a new conference named the Southeastern Connecticut Athletic Conference. During that same time five other schools, Bacon Academy, Waterford, Montville, Wheeler and Stonington applied to join the shoreline conference. For Ice hockey, Fitch, Bacon Academy, East Lyme, Griswold, Hale Ray, Killingly, Ledyard, Montville, Norwich Free Academy, Stonington, Waterford & Wheeler make up the coop team of the Eastern CT Eagles.

== Schools ==
School	Location	Nickname	Colors
Bacon Academy	Colchester, Connecticut	Bobcats	
East Lyme High School	East Lyme, Connecticut	Vikings	
Fitch High School	Groton, Connecticut	Falcons	
Griswold High School	Griswold, Connecticut	Wolverines	
Killingly High School	Killingly, Connecticut	Trailblazers	
Ledyard High School	Ledyard, Connecticut	Colonels	
Lyman Memorial High School	Lebanon, Connecticut	Bulldogs	
Montville High School	Montville, Connecticut	Wolves	
New London High School	New London, Connecticut	Whalers	
Norwich Free Academy	Norwich, Connecticut	Wildcats	
Plainfield High School	Central Village, Connecticut	Panthers	
Putnam High School	Putnam, Connecticut	Clippers	
Saint Bernard School	Uncasville, Connecticut	Saints	
Stonington High School	Pawcatuck, Connecticut	Bears	
Tourtellotte Memorial High School	North Grosvenordale, Connecticut	Tigers	
Waterford High School	Waterford, Connecticut	Lancers	
Wheeler High School	North Stonington, Connecticut	Lions	
Windham High School	Willimantic, Connecticut	Whippets	
Woodstock Academy	Woodstock, Connecticut	Centaurs	

== Fall sports ==
- Field Hockey
- Volleyball
- Soccer
- Football
- Swimming (girls)
- Cross Country

== Winter sports ==
- Basketball
- Fencing
- Wrestling
- Swimming (boys)
- Indoor Track
- Ice Hockey
- Cheerleading

== Spring sports ==
- Baseball
- Softball
- Tennis
- Lacrosse
- Outdoor Track
- Golf
