= Packerville Bridge =

- U.S. National Register of Historic Places
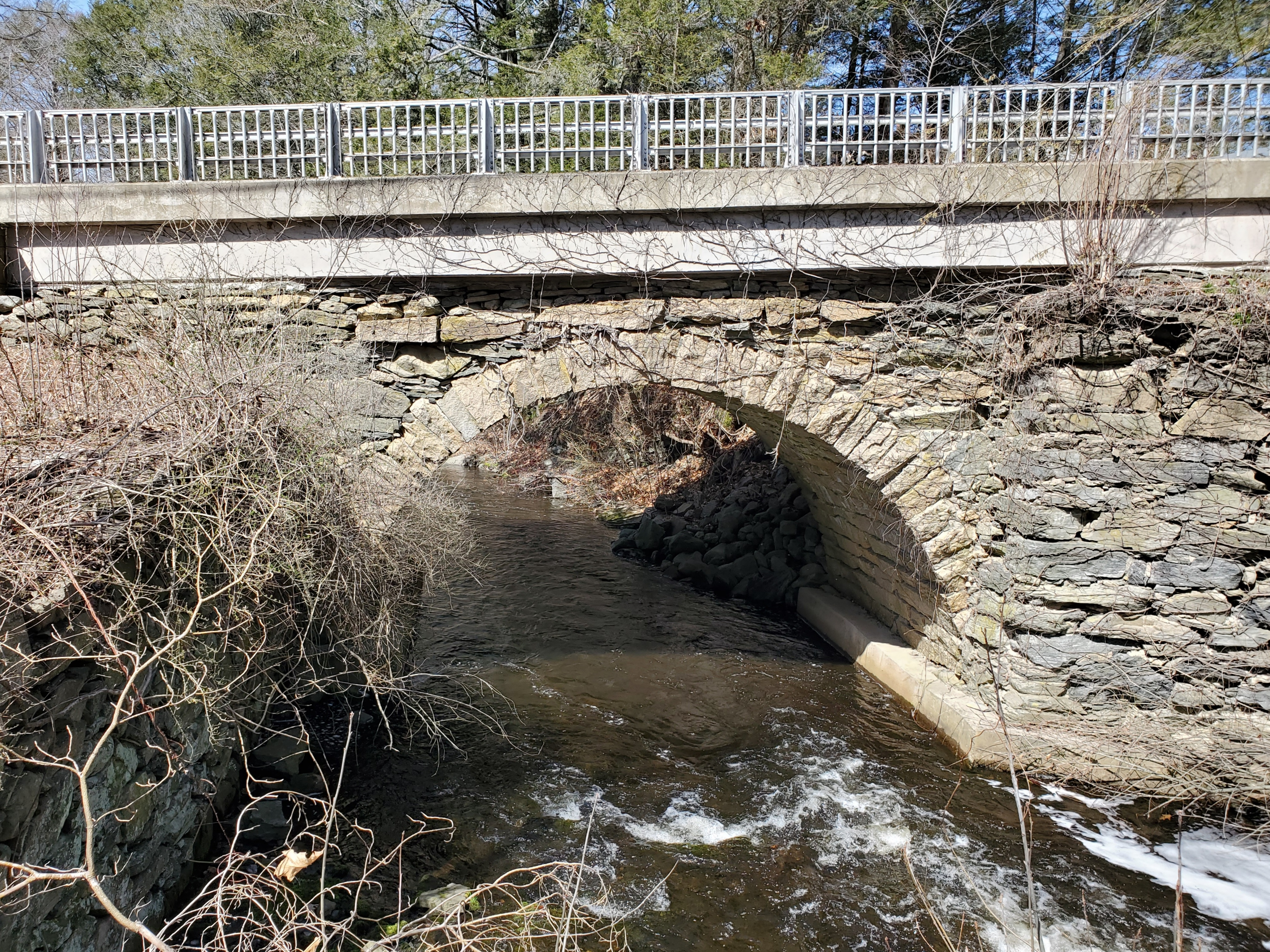
- Packerville Bridge in April 2023

- Location within Connecticut Location within the United States
- Location: Packerville Road over Mill Brook, Plainfield, Connecticut
- Coordinates: 41°40′1″N 71°56′56″W
- Area: less than one acre
- Built: 1886
- Architect: Olin, Nathaniel; Baldwin, Isaac J.
- Architectural style: Masonry arch
- NRHP reference No.: 92001565
- Added to NRHP: November 27, 1992

The Packerville Bridge is a historic stone arch bridge carrying Packerville Road over Mill Brook in Plainfield, Connecticut. Built in 1886, it is one of less than twenty surviving 19th-century stone arch bridges in the state and is a well-preserved example of vernacular 19th-century masonry bridge technology. The bridge was added to the National Register of Historic Places in 1992.

== Description and history ==
The Packerville Bridge is located in a rural setting southwest of Plainfield's central village, carrying Packerville Road over Mill Brook just north of its junction with Lowes Way. The bridge is located just downstream from the Packerville Dam, a remnant surviving element of a 19th-century mill that stood nearby at the time of the bridge's construction. It is a masonry arch bridge with cut-stone barrels and rubble spandrels spanning 26 feet (7.9 m) and a total structure length of 31 feet (9.4 m). The roadway width is about 20 feet (6.1 m), and is set about that distance above the water flow.

The bridge was built in 1886 after a major flood washed away most of the town's bridges. It was built out of stone because locations below mill dams were considered at greater risk of flooding owing to dam breaches, and stone bridges were thought to be better able to withstand that type of event. The stone was quarried near Westerly, Rhode Island. The principal alteration to this structure was changing the guard rails from stone to metal in the 20th century.

== See also ==
- National Register of Historic Places listings in Windham County, Connecticut
- List of bridges on the National Register of Historic Places in Connecticut
