= Quinebaug River Prehistoric Archeological District =

Archaeological site in Connecticut, United States

- U.S. National Register of Historic Places
- U.S. Historic district
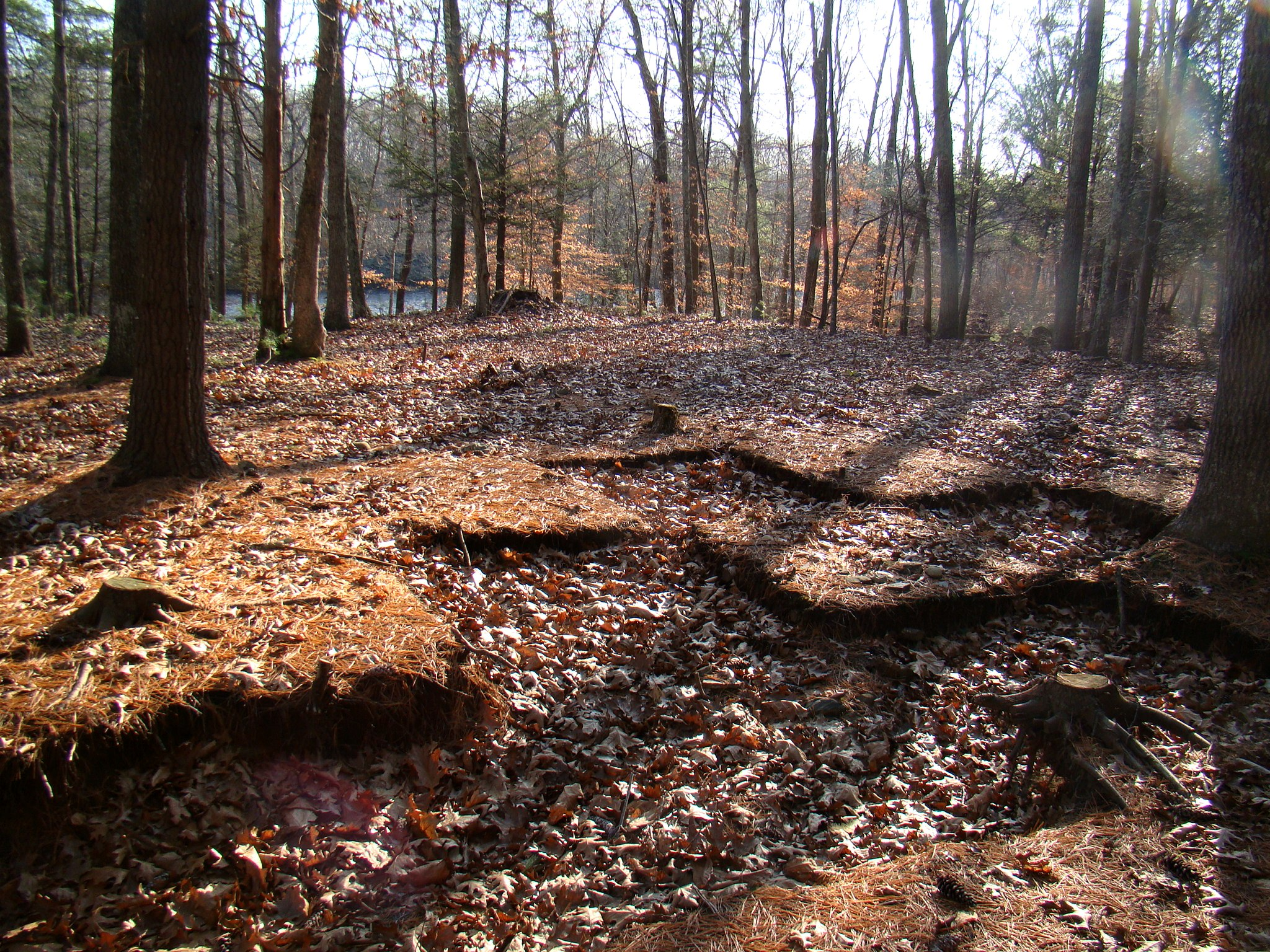
- 2009 dig of Native American fishing village conducted by State Archeologist and UCONN

- Location within Connecticut Location within the United States
- Location: Between CT 169 and the Quinebaug River; Canterbury, Connecticut
- Coordinates: 41.6732°N 71.9571°W
- Area: 22 acres (8.9 ha)
- NRHP reference No.: 09000696
- Added to NRHP: September 7, 2009

The Quinebaug River Prehistoric Archeological District encompasses a collection of prehistoric archaeological sites near the Quinebaug River in Canterbury, Connecticut. The district covers 22 acres (8.9 ha), including five sites dating from the Late Archaic (6,000 years ago) to the period of European contact. The district was listed on the National Register of Historic Places in 2009, and was designated a state archaeological preserve in 2003.

== Description ==
The Quinebaug River Prehistoric Archeological District is located in eastern Canterbury, south of the town center on a terrace overlooking the Quinebaug River. It consists of state-owned land on the west bank of the river, east of Connecticut Route 169 south of Connecticut Route 14 and north of Connecticut Route 668. Five separate sites with architectural significance were identified in this area during survey work conducted in 2001 and 2002. The sites range in size from 6.4 acres (2.6 ha) to just 0.25 acres (0.10 ha), with stone finds dating mainly to the Woodland Period. Two of the sites exhibit evidence of Late Archaic occupation, and all are likely to provide additional information through further excavation.

Finds at these sites were significantly more plentiful from the Woodland Period, suggesting a period of more intensive (and possibly long-term) occupation. The area appears from the stratigraphy to have been less flood-prone then than in the Late Archaic, but there is relatively sparse evidence of the more sedentary agrarian practices of the Late Woodland. The stone finds at the site are of particular interest, because some of the appear to originate in quarries located some distance away, suggesting that trade networks were well established.

== See also ==
- National Register of Historic Places listings in Windham County, Connecticut
