= Plainfield Street Historic District =

Historic district in Connecticut, United States

- U.S. National Register of Historic Places
- U.S. Historic district
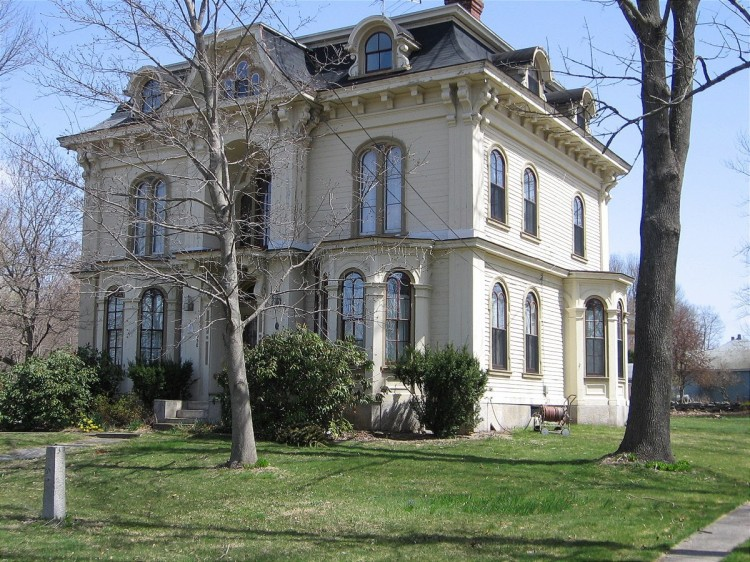
- A Second Empire house on Norwich Road

- Location within Connecticut Location within the United States
- Location: Roughly, Norwich Road from Railroad Avenue to Academy Hill Road, Plainfield, Connecticut
- Coordinates: 41°41′9″N 71°54′54″W
- Area: 30 acres (12 ha)
- Architect: Town, Ithiel
- Architectural style: Greek Revival, Colonial, Federal
- NRHP reference No.: 91000350
- Added to NRHP: April 11, 1991

Plainfield Street Historic District is a historic district in Plainfield, Connecticut that encompasses the historic area of Plainfield Village, the town center of Plainfield. The district is linear, being located along Route 12 between Railroad Avenue and Route 14A. It has been the center of the town's civic life since its settlement in the early 18th century, and includes two centuries of architectural styles. The district was listed on the National Register of Historic Places in 1991.

== Description and history ==
The town of Plainfield was settled by English colonists in the late 17th century and incorporated in 1699. A ridge east of the Quinebaug River was where the colonial meeting house was located, and is now where the First Congregational Church of Plainfield stands; it was built in 1816 to a design by Ithiel Town. The road along the ridge, now Route 12, developed as a major north-south route in eastern Connecticut, and was crossed by the road connecting Hartford with Providence, Rhode Island, now Route 14A and Cemetery Road. The town center flourished as a crossroads community into the early 19th century, after which its importance waned in comparison to the town's burgeoning textile mill villages.

The district is now mostly residential with some commercial development at its north end. It consists of 30 buildings and 24 associated outbuildings, most dating from the late 18th to early 19th century. Buildings are typically one and two-story frame residences. Stylistically, they represent a cross section of styles popular between about 1790 and 1880, with only a few 20th-century buildings intruding. Non-residential buildings in addition to the church include the c. 1800 Italianate Union Hall. The name of the district comes from the original street name of what is now known as Norwich Road.

== See also ==
- National Register of Historic Places listings in Windham County, Connecticut
