= Ramsdell (disambiguation) =

Ramsdell is a small village in the English county of Hampshire.

Ramsdell can also refer to:

== People ==
- Alvah T. Ramsdell (1852–1928), American architect
- Charles Ramsdell (basketball) (born 1985), Malagasy athlete
- Charles W. Ramsdell (1877–1942), American historian
- C. P. Ramsdell (c. 1825–1882), American newspaper founder, politician and United States Marshal
- Fred Ramsdell (born 1961), American immunologist
- Frederick Winthrop Ramsdell (1865–1915), American artist
- George A. Ramsdell (1834–1900), American lawyer, businessman and politician, 46th governor of New Hampshire
- Heather Ramsdell, American poet and playwright
- Homer Ramsdell (1810–1894), American businessman
- Jeffrey M. Ramsdell, judge of the Superior Court of Washington for King County (Seattle)
- Jay Ramsdell (1964–1989), Commissioner of the Continental Basketball Association
- Lewis Stephen Ramsdell (1895–1975), American mineralogist after whom Ramsdellite was named
- Rammy Ramsdell (1894–1977), American college multi-sport athlete
- Thomas Jefferson Ramsdell (1833–1917), American lawyer, politician and entrepreneur
- Walter L. Ramsdell (1860–1909), American politician
- Willie Ramsdell (1916–1969), American Major League Baseball pitcher

== Other uses ==
- Ramsdell Hall, Odd Rode, Cheshire, England, a country house
- Hiram Ramsdell House, Farmington, Maine, United States, on the National Register of Historic Places (NRHP)
- Z. D. Ramsdell House, Ceredo, West Virginia, United States, on the NRHP
- Hezekiah S. Ramsdell Farm, Thompson, Connecticut, United States, on the NRHP
- Ramsdell Public Library, Great Barrington, Massachusetts, United States, on the NRHP
- Ramsdell Theatre, Manistee, Michigan, United States, on the NRHP

== See also ==
- Ramsdale (disambiguation)
