= Cargill Falls Mill =

- Cargill Falls Mill (Wilkinson Mill)
- U.S. National Register of Historic Places
- U.S. Historic district
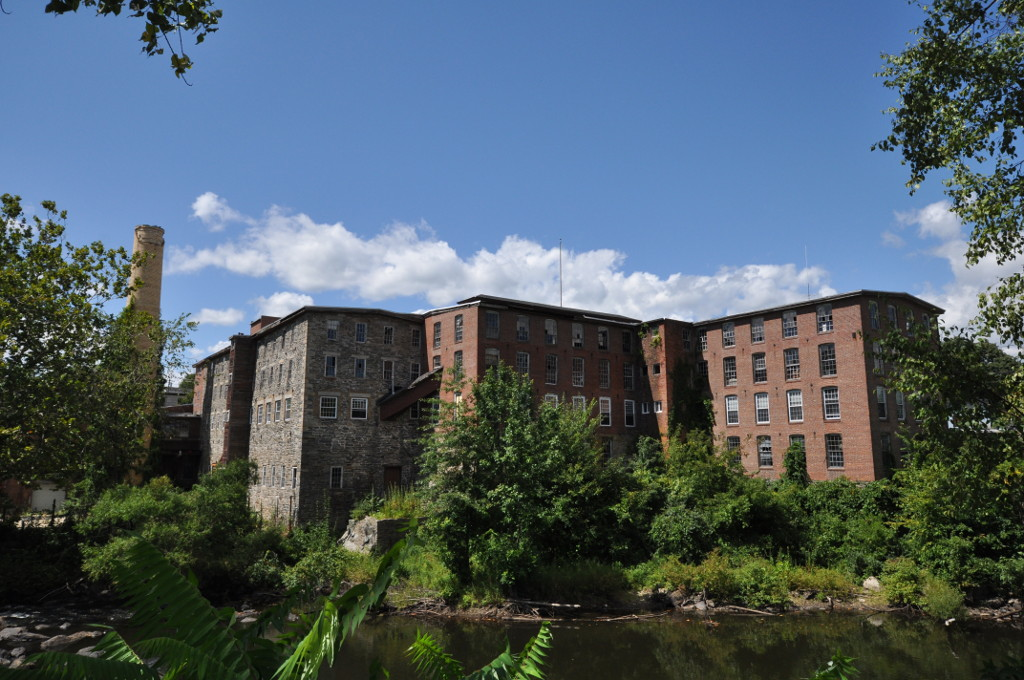

- Location within Connecticut Location within the United States
- Interactive map showing the location of Cargill Falls Mill
- Location: 52-58 Pomfret Street, Putnam, Connecticut
- Coordinates: 41°54′54″N 71°54′42″W
- Area: 7.5 acres (3.0 ha)
- Built: 1806
- NRHP reference No.: 14000435
- Added to NRHP: July 29, 2014

The Cargill Falls Mill, also known historically as the Wilkinson Mill, is a historic textile mill complex at 52-58 Pomfret Street in Putnam, Connecticut. Founded in 1806, it is one of the state's oldest mill complexes, and it retains examples of mill architecture spanning more than 175 years. It was listed on the National Register of Historic Places in 2014.

== Description and history ==
The Cargill Falls Mill occupies a prominent location across the Quinebaug River from downtown Putnam, set partially on a point projecting eastward on the south side of Pomfret Street (United States Route 44). The mill complex occupies about 7.5 acres (3.0 ha), and includes twenty interconnected structures, all of which were originally used in some way in the textile manufacturing process. The buildings vary in size and height, with the largest five stories tall. The oldest building on the site was built in 1824, while the most recent new buildings dating to 1950, although there have been some subsequent alterations. Most of the construction is of brick with interior timber framing, although there is one building built out of coursed rubblestone, and another of wood framing.

The roughly 30-foot (9.1 m) drop in the Quinebaug River at this point saw early industrial use in the 18th century, with grist, saw, and fulling mills were set up in the vicinity. In 1806, a group of investors from Rhode Island that included Samuel Slater's father-in-law, Oziel Wilkinson, established the Pomfret Manufacturing Company. They built a four-story wood-frame mill building on this site, whose foundation is still in used for one of the later 19th-century buildings. That mill was a direct emulation of Slater's mill in Pawtucket. and produced cotton thread. The growth of the town around this mill complex was instrumental in its eventual incorporation in 1855 of Putnam out of portions of Pomfret, Killingly, and Thompson.

== See also ==
- National Register of Historic Places listings in Windham County, Connecticut
