= Jonathan Wheeler House =

Historic house in Canterbury, Connecticut, US

- U.S. National Register of Historic Places
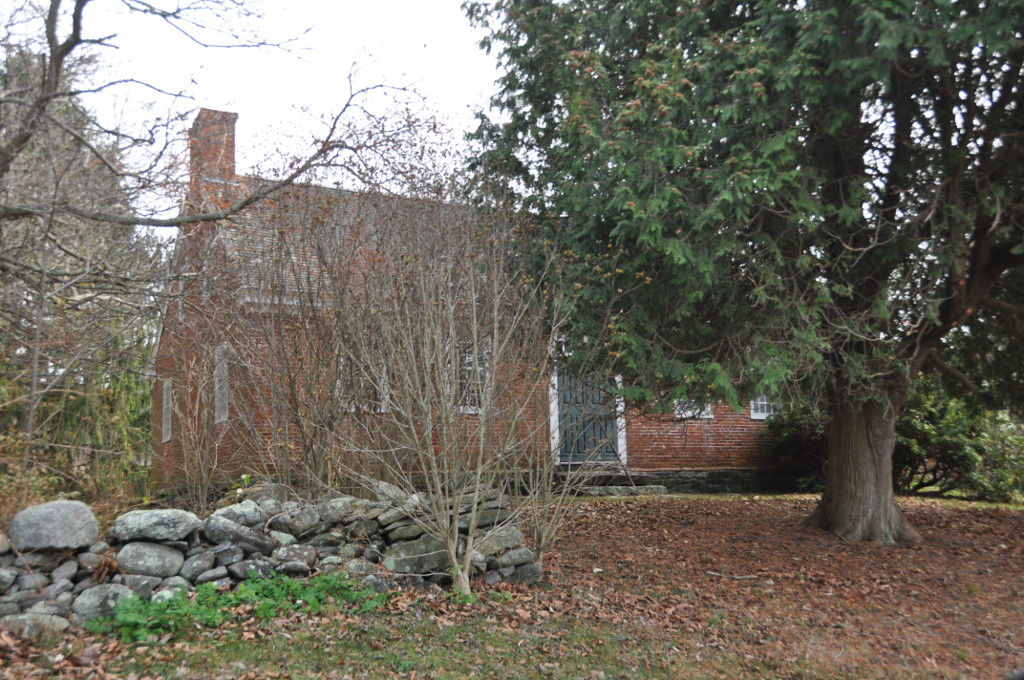

- Location within Connecticut Location within the United States
- Location: North Society Road, Canterbury, Connecticut
- Coordinates: 41°45′3″N 71°59′26″W
- Area: 85 acres (34 ha)
- Built: c. 1760
- Architect: Wheeler, Jonathan
- Architectural style: Georgian
- NRHP reference No.: 82004405
- Added to NRHP: February 11, 1982

The Jonathan Wheeler House is a historic house on North Society Road in Canterbury, Connecticut. Built c. 1760, it has features unusual for its time, including end chimneys and a center-hall plan. The use of brick in this part of rural Connecticut is also unusual for the period. The house was listed on the National Register of Historic Places in 1982.

== Description and history ==
The Jonathan Wheeler House is located in a rural setting of northern Canterbury, on the east side of North Society Road about 0.5 miles (0.80 km) south of the Brooklyn line. It is set near the road, at the southwest corner of an 85-acre (34 ha) parcel historically associated with it. It is a 1 1/2-story brick structure, with a side gable roof and end chimneys. Its main facade is five bays wide, the center entrance set in a rectangular opening with a seven-light transom window. The interior follows a central hall plan, with parlor spaces on either side of a truncated hall, and the kitchen at the rear. Stairs to the attic are located in the hall, on the right side. It retains a number of original features, including woodwork, plaster, and brickwork. A modern wood-frame wing extends to the rear and right side.

The house was built by about 1760 by Jonathan Wheeler, who moved to the area from Stonington in 1751. His family was well-established there, and he had purchased a number of land parcels in the Canterbury area in the 1750s. The house is unusual for its central-hall plan, built at a time when central chimneys were more common, and for its use of brick in a single-story rural building. The house remained in the hands of Wheeler descendants until 1870.

== See also ==
- National Register of Historic Places listings in Windham County, Connecticut
