= Willimantic Freight House and Office =

- U.S. National Register of Historic Places
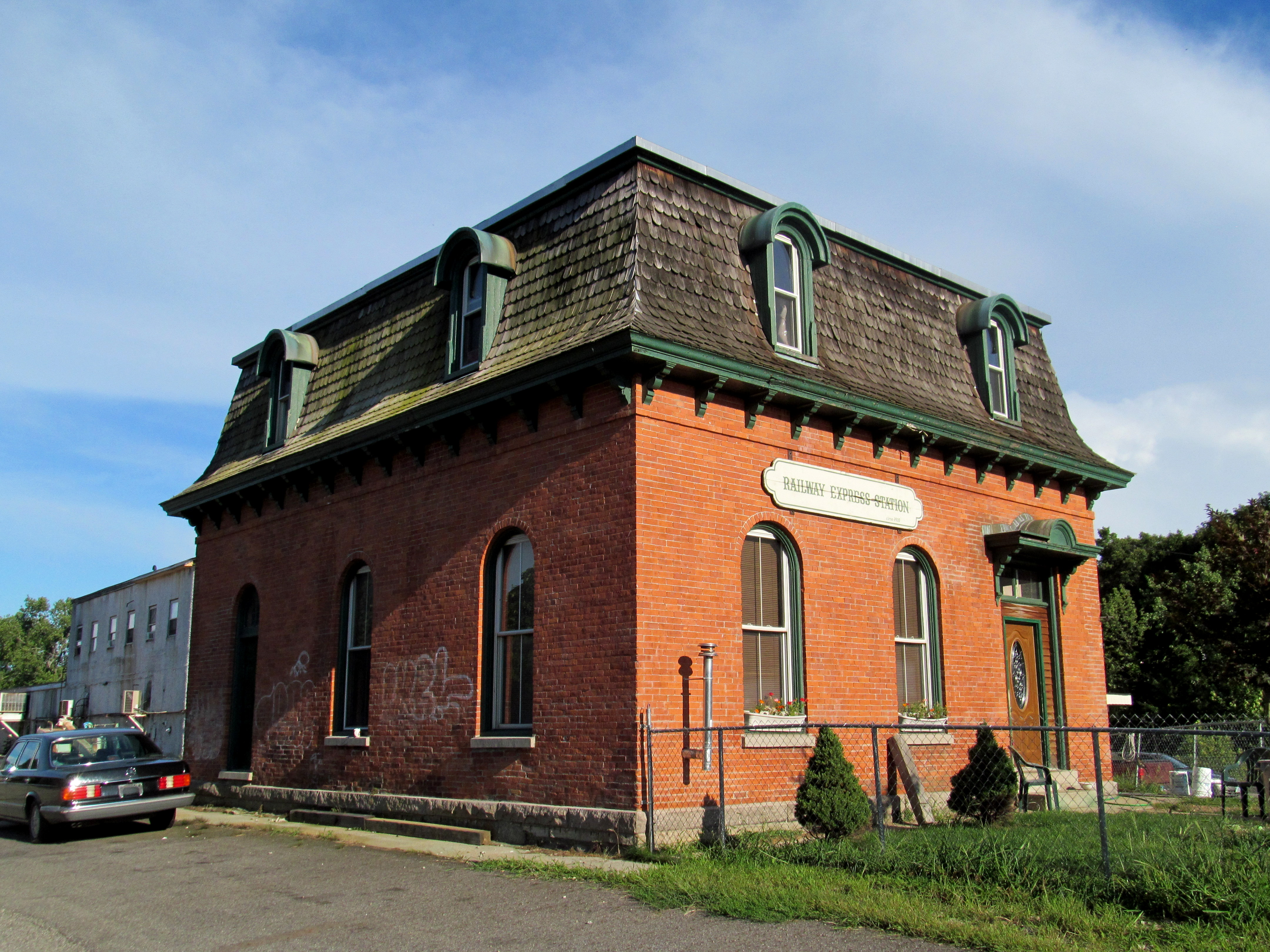

- Location within Connecticut Location within the United States
- Location: Bridge Street, Willimantic, Connecticut
- Coordinates: 41°42′44″N 72°13′15″W
- Area: 1 acre (0.40 ha)
- Built: 1870
- Architectural style: Second Empire
- NRHP reference No.: 82004414
- Added to NRHP: June 14, 1982

The Willimantic Freight House and Office is a historic railroad freight facility on Bridge Street in the Willimantic section of Windham, Connecticut. Built in 1870, the freight office, a fine example of Second Empire architecture, is now the only surviving element of the city's 19th-century railroad buildings; the freight house has been demolished. The buildings were listed on the National Register of Historic Places in 1982 as an important reminder of the city's importance as a major railroad junction in eastern Connecticut.

== Description and history ==
The former Willimantic Freight Office building is located on the grounds of the Bridge Street Plaza on the west side of Bridge Street south of Main Street. It is located at the western end of the main plaza building, between it and the former railroad right-of-way. The building is 1-1/2 stories in height, with a mansard roof providing a full second story with round-top dormer windows. It is roughly square, with three bays on each side. The main entrance is on the west side, sheltered by a decorative hood. Windows are set in round-arch openings, as is a secondary entrance on the track-facing northern facade. The freight house originally stood just east of the office; it was a long single-story frame structure, 170 feet (52 m) long, covered by a gabled roof. It has since been demolished.

The freight office was built about 1870, and is a prominent local example of Second Empire styling. It is also the last surviving element of what was once a large suite of railroad-related buildings, including passenger, freight, and maintenance operations that populated the city's railyards. At the time, the city served numerous freight trains daily, which were the principal means by which goods were delivered to the city. The freight office and shed would have been a major service and transit point for the city's merchants and economy.

== See also ==
- National Register of Historic Places listings in Windham County, Connecticut
