= Ramsdale =

Ramsdale may refer to:

- Ramsdale Beck, a small river on the North Yorkshire Coast
- Ramsdale Valley, a valley in Scarborough, England, spanned by Valley Bridge
- Aaron Ramsdale (born 1998), English footballer
- Dick Ramsdale (1885–1933), English rugby player

== See also ==
- Ramsdell (disambiguation)
