= Taylor's Corner =

Historic house in Connecticut, United States

- U.S. National Register of Historic Places
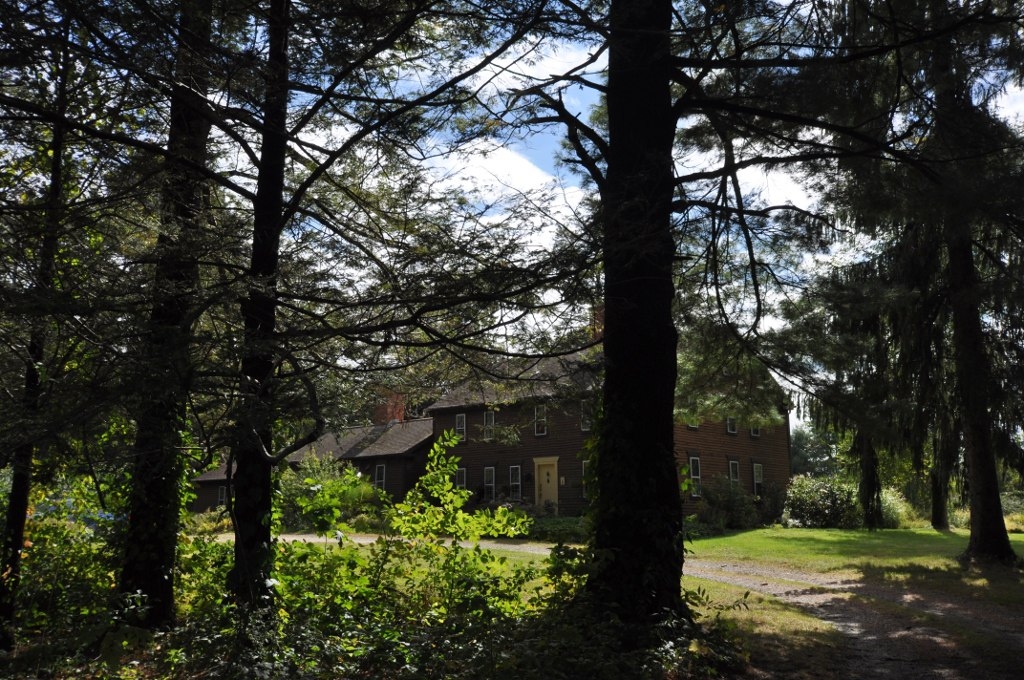

- Location within Connecticut Location within the United States
- Location: 880 CT 171, Woodstock, Connecticut
- Coordinates: 41°56′56″N 72°00′42″W
- Area: 16.4 acres (6.6 ha)
- Architectural style: Colonial
- NRHP reference No.: 88003220
- Added to NRHP: January 19, 1989

Taylor's Corner is a historic house at 880 Connecticut Route 171 in Woodstock, Connecticut. Dating to the 18th century, it is a well-preserved local example of vernacular colonial and Federal architecture. It was listed on the National Register of Historic Places in 1989. It operated as a bed and breakfast inn until 2020 when it was sold and became a private residence once again.

== Description and history ==
Taylor's Corner is located in a rural setting west of the central village of Woodstock, on the south side of a bend in Somers Turnpike (CT 171) at its junction with Pulpit Rock Road. It is a 2 1/2-story wood-frame structure, five bays wide, with a side-gable roof and a large central chimney. A series of additions and wings extend to the left side of the main block. The main block is built using a timber frame and plank-framed walls, and architectural evidence suggest that the west side of the house is somewhat older than the east side. The interior follows a central chimney plan, with a narrow entrance vestibule also containing a narrow winding staircase to the second floor.

Based on architectural analysis (because the documentary record is cloudy and ambiguous before 1800), the main house probably reached its present form around 1790, and represents a well-preserved example of 18th-century rural residential architecture. The current owners of the property believe the house's oldest portions to date to the early 18th century, possibly as early as 1713. The property has had a long succession of owners, and got the name "Taylor's Corner" from Clinton Taylor, an early 20th century owner.

== See also ==
- National Register of Historic Places listings in Windham County, Connecticut
