= Putnam Town Hall =

- U.S. National Register of Historic Places
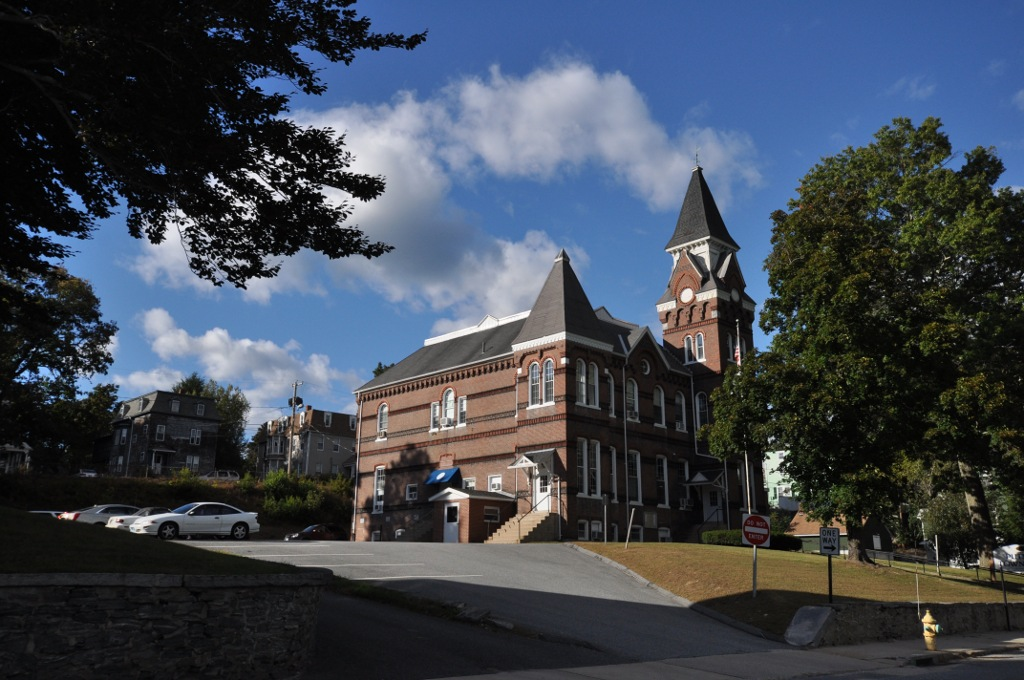
- Putnam Town Hall, formerly the high school

- Location within Connecticut Location within the United States
- Location: 126 Church Street; Putnam, Connecticut
- Coordinates: 41°55′6″N 71°54′47″W
- Area: 1 acre (0.40 ha)
- Built: 1874
- Architect: Buck, Carlos C.
- Architectural style: Late Gothic Revival
- NRHP reference No.: 93001343
- Added to NRHP: December 10, 1993

Putnam Town Hall, formerly Putnam High School, is an historic civic building at 126 Church Street in Putnam, Connecticut. Constructed in 1874, it is one of the oldest surviving high school buildings in the state, and a distinctive local example of Gothic Revival architecture. It was added to the National Register of Historic Places in 1993.

== Description and history ==
Putnam Town Hall is located across the Quinebaug River from downtown Putnam, on the west side of Church Street between Fenner and Ravine Streets. It is a large 2 1/2-story brick structure with a hip roof. The main focal elements of the building are two towers, one being two stories in height at the front left corner, and a three-story tower at the front right, which has an elaborate gabled clock stage (but no clock), above which is a pyramidal roof. Most of the first-floor windows are set in segmented-arch openings, while those on the second floor are mainly rounded. Windows are set in pairs in the towers, and there are horizontal bands of ornamental brickwork, featuring bricks of varying color shades. The interior has undergone significant alterations due to its reuse as municipal offices, but some original trim and decorative features, as well as the basic layout, remain.

The town of Putnam voted in 1873 to build a high school. It was completed the following year, and graduated its first class in 1876. The building was used by the town as its high school until 1911, when overcrowding prompted a move to a new facility (now no longer standing). The current high school, located on Woodstock Avenue, was opened in 1955. This building now houses municipal offices, but is one of the oldest surviving high school buildings in the state. It is also a distinctive local example of the Ruskinian Gothic style of architecture.

== See also ==
- National Register of Historic Places listings in Windham County, Connecticut
