= Canterbury, Connecticut =

- Town
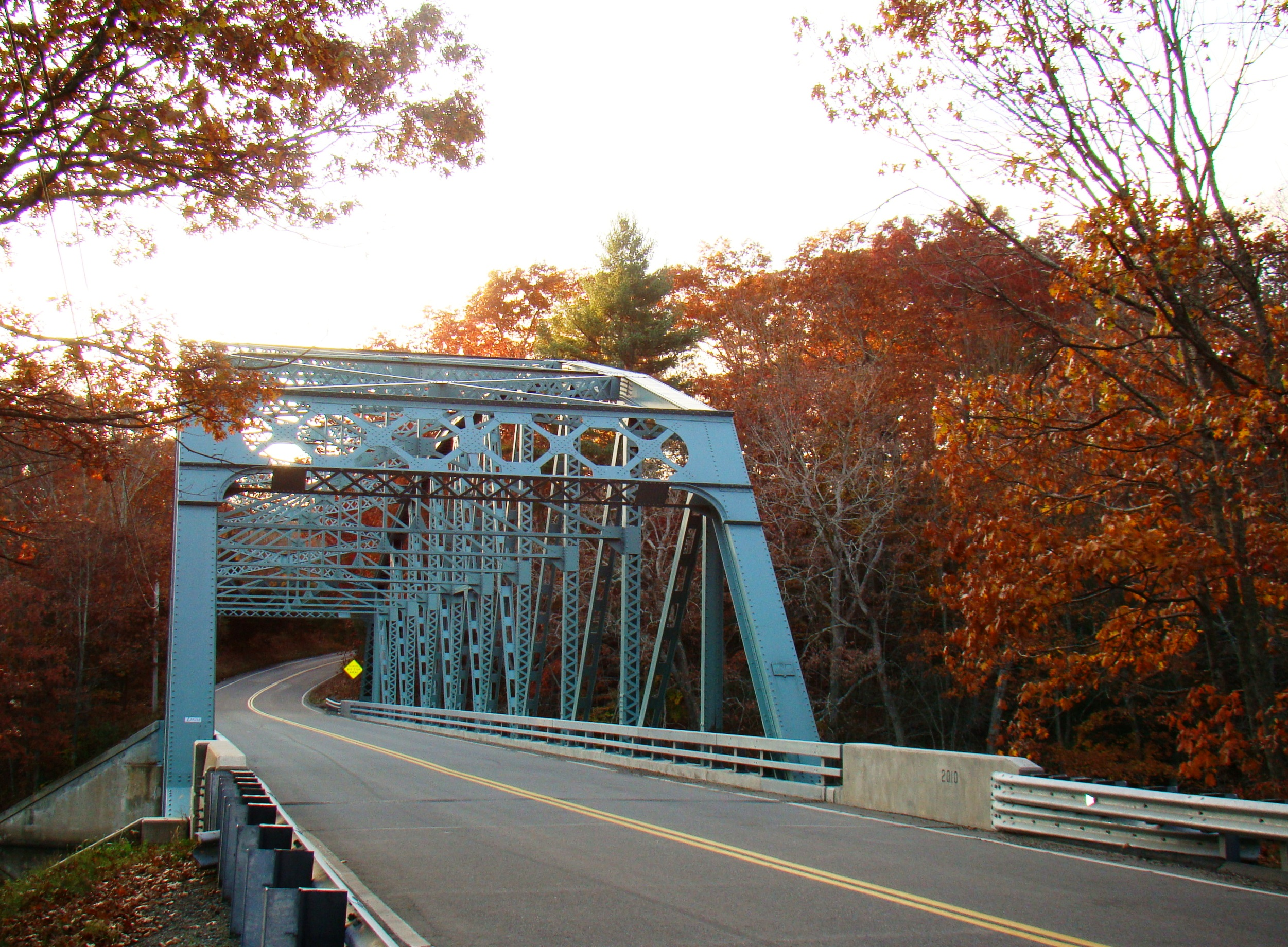
- Butts Bridge over the Quinebaug River

- Seal
- Interactive map of Canterbury, Connecticut
- Coordinates: 41°42′N 72°0′W
- Country: United States
- U.S. state: Connecticut
- County: Windham
- Region: Northeastern CT
- Incorporated: 1703

Government
  - Type: Selectman-town meeting
  - First selectman: Christopher J. Lippke (R)
  - Selectman: Mark O. Weeks (R)
  - Selectman: Jonathan T. Lane (D)

Area
  - Total: 40.2 sq mi (104.1 km^{2})
  - Land: 39.9 sq mi (103.3 km^{2})
  - Water: 0.27 sq mi (0.7 km^{2})
- Elevation: 351 ft (107 m)

Population (2020)
  - Total: 5,045
  - Density: 126.5/sq mi (48.84/km^{2})
- Time zone: UTC-5 (EST)
  - Summer (DST): UTC-4 (EDT)
- ZIP code: 06331
- Area codes: 860/959
- FIPS code: 09-12130
- GNIS feature ID: 0213403
- Website: www.canterburyct.org

Canterbury is a town in Windham County, Connecticut, United States. The town is part of the Northeastern Connecticut Planning Region. The population was 5,045 at the 2020 census.

== History ==
The area was settled by English colonists in the 1680s as Peagscomsuck. It consisted mainly of land north of Norwich, south of New Roxbury, Massachusetts (now Woodstock, Connecticut), and west of the Quinebaug River, Peagscomsuck Island, and the Plainfield Settlement. In 1703 this section was officially separated from Plainfield and named The Town of Canterbury. The town's namesake is Canterbury, England.

=== Prudence Crandall's School (1831–1834) ===
Canterbury was a very influential town at this period, and was particularly noted for the public spirit and high character of its leading men, and its cultivated and agreeable society. Andrew T. Judson, State attorney and successful lawyer, Dr. [Andrew] Harris, the skillful surgeon. Esquire Frost, the devoted champion of temperance, Rufus Adams, with his fund of dry humor, George S. White, with his strong character and multifarious knowledge, Luther Paine, John Francis, Thomas and Stephen Coit, Samuel L. Hough, all solid men interested in public affairs — had their homes at or near Canterbury Green, and gave tone and prominence to the town. Few country towns could boast such social attractions. Dr. Harris was one of the most genial and hospitable of men, and his new model house with its rare appendage of a conservatory and choice flower-garden, was the wonder of all the County. Mrs. Harris had inherited the social characteristics of her distinguished father, General Moses Cleaveland, and received their unnumbered guests with all his ease and heartiness. A handsome new house had been also built by Mr. Judson, in which much company was entertained, although it was said that Mrs. Judson as a Windham lady assumed superiority over her neighbors. Her husband, who liked to rally her upon this weakness, once called her down to the parlor to receive a Windham visitor, and most blandly presented to her an intrusive frog, which had hopped into the hall. His own tact and courtesy made ample amends for his wife's reputed deficiencies. Pleasant familiar intercourse was maintained among the village residents. All united with uncommon unanimity in plans for village improvement and public benefit, and it was in carrying out one of these projects that they struck upon the rock which foundered them.

In 1832, Prudence Crandall, a schoolteacher raised as a Quaker, stirred controversy when she opened the Canterbury Female Boarding School and admitted black girls as students. Prominent Canterbury resident Andrew T. Judson led efforts against the school. The Connecticut General Assembly passed a "Black Law", which prohibited the education of black children from out of state. Crandall persisted in teaching, and in 1833 was arrested and kept in jail overnight.

Unsuccessful and long legal proceedings were mounted but violence by a mob of Canterbury residents forced the closure of the school in 1834. Crandall left the state and never returned. Connecticut repealed the Black Law in 1838.

In 1877 the town of Canterbury recognized Crandall, who had moved to Elk Falls, Kansas, with a small pension. Crandall, who by then was living in poverty, said that this helped improve her living condition. She died in 1890.

== Legacy and honors ==
In 1995, the Connecticut General Assembly designated Prudence Crandall as the state's official heroine because she opened the first school in the United States for black girls. The school still stands in Canterbury, operating as the Prudence Crandall Museum. It has been designated as a National Historic Landmark, and it is the leading tourist attraction in Canterbury.

In 2009 a life-size bronze statue of Prudence Crandall with an African-American student was installed in the state capital.

== Geography ==
According to the United States Census Bureau, the town has a total area of 40.2 square miles (104 km^{2}), of which 39.9 square miles (103 km^{2}) is land and 0.2 square miles (0.52 km^{2}) (0.62%) is water.

== Demographics ==
Historical population
Census	Pop.	Note	%±
1820	1,984		—
1850	1,669		—
1860	1,591		−4.7%
1870	1,543		−3.0%
1880	1,272		−17.6%
1890	947		−25.6%
1900	876		−7.5%
1910	868		−0.9%
1920	896		3.2%
1930	942		5.1%
1940	992		5.3%
1950	1,321		33.2%
1960	1,857		40.6%
1970	2,673		43.9%
1980	3,426		28.2%
1990	4,467		30.4%
2000	4,692		5.0%
2010	5,132		9.4%
2020	5,045		−1.7%
U.S. Decennial Census

As of the census of 2000, there were 4,692 people, 1,717 households, and 1,339 families residing in the town. The population density was 117.6 inhabitants per square mile (45.4/km^{2}). There were 1,762 housing units at an average density of 44.2 per square mile (17.1/km^{2}). The racial makeup of the town was 97.34% White, 0.36% African American, 0.28% Native American, 0.26% Asian, 0.02% Pacific Islander, 0.30% from other races, and 1.45% from two or more races. Hispanic or Latino of any race were 1.07% of the population.

There were 1,717 households, out of which 37.2% had children under the age of 18 living with them, 65.5% were married couples living together, 8.1% had a female householder with no husband present, and 22.0% were non-families. 16.7% of all households were made up of individuals, and 6.6% had someone living alone who was 65 years of age or older. The average household size was 2.73 and the average family size was 3.06.

In the town, the population was spread out, with 25.7% under the age of 18, 7.3% from 18 to 24, 31.4% from 25 to 44, 26.3% from 45 to 64, and 9.3% who were 65 years of age or older. The median age was 38 years. For every 100 females, there were 103.3 males. For every 100 females age 18 and over, there were 97.9 males.

The median income for a household in the town was $55,547, and the median income for a family was $65,095. Males had a median income of $41,521 versus $28,672 for females. The per capita income for the town was $22,317. About 3.5% of families and 4.5% of the population were below the poverty line, including 4.2% of those under age 18 and 10.0% of those age 65 or over.

== Arts and culture ==
=== Museums and other points of interest ===
- Canterbury Center Historic District – Roughly along Elmdale, Library, North Canterbury, South Canterbury, and Westminster Roads (added May 10, 1998). The historic district includes Colonial, Federal, and other architectural styles.
- Capt. John Clark House – Route 169, South of Canterbury (added November 6, 1970)
- Jonathan Wheeler House – North Society Road (added March 11, 1982)
- March Route of Rochambeau's Army: Manship Road-Barstow Road – Manship Road, Barstow Road from jct. with Manship Road to Westminster Road (added February 8, 2003)
- Prudence Crandall House – Jct. of CT 14 and 169 (added November 22, 1970)
- Westminster Congregational Church
- FaithWay Community Church – 567 South Canterbury Road Canterbury, CT 06374

== Government ==
Voter Registration and Party Enrollment as of October 29, 2019
Party	Active Voters	Inactive Voters	Total Voters	Percentage
Republican	1,105	31	1,136	30.35%
Democratic	805	27	832	22.23%
Unaffiliated	1,657	51	1,708	45.63%
Minor Parties	64	3	67	1.79%
Total	3,631	112	3,743	100%

Presidential Election Results
Year	Democratic	Republican	Third Parties
2020	39.2% 1,182	58.3% 1,755	2.5% 75
2016	34.5% 932	59.5% 1,609	6.0% 161
2012	47.1% 1,197	50.9% 1,294	2.0% 52
2008	48.6% 1,334	49.0% 1,345	2.4% 65
2004	45.3% 1,193	51.9% 1,370	2.8% 73
2000	47.8% 1,085	44.1% 1,001	8.1% 182
1996	42.0% 917	36.6% 799	21.4% 466
1992	32.3% 754	31.8% 742	35.9% 840
1988	37.5% 662	61.5% 1,086	1.0% 17
1984	28.2% 450	71.5% 1,141	0.3% 4
1980	28.3% 428	61.4% 928	10.3% 155
1976	47.0% 610	52.5% 681	0.5% 7
1972	30.5% 365	68.1% 816	1.4% 17
1968	35.8% 365	55.9% 571	8.3% 84
1964	54.9% 535	45.1% 438	0.00% 0
1960	41.2% 415	58.8% 592	0.00% 0
1956	33.2% 278	66.8% 559	0.00% 0

== Education ==
Students from grades Kindergarten through 8 are zoned to the Canterbury School District. The district has two schools:

- Canterbury Elementary School
- Dr. Helen Baldwin Middle School

The local elementary school for kindergarten through fourth grades is Canterbury Elementary School, whose mascot is the Kitt Fox. The local middle school for fifth through eighth grades is Dr. Helen Baldwin Middle School, whose mascot is the bulldog.

As Canterbury has no high school of its own, Canterbury students have the option of attending H.H. Ellis Technical High School, Griswold High School, Killingly High School, Norwich Technical High School, Norwich Free Academy, or Woodstock Academy.

== Notable people ==
- John Adams, (1772–1863), born in Canterbury, educator and organizer of several hundred Sunday schools
- Horace Austin (1831–1905), the sixth governor of Minnesota (1870–1874), was born in town
- Margaret Wise Brown (1919–1952), author of children's literature
- Asa B. Carey, U.S. Army brigadier general
- Moses Cleaveland (1754–1806), a surveyor and namesake of Cleveland, Ohio, was born in town
- Prudence Crandall (1803–1890), a schoolteacher who set up a school for black girls in town despite local resistance
- Sarah Harris Fayerweather (1812–1878), first black student in Prudence Crandall's school
- Luther Jewett (1772–1860), United States Representative from Vermont, was born in town
- Ephraim Paine (1730–1785) delegate for New York to the Continental Congress in 1784, was born in town
- Charles Rocket, born Charles Adams Claverie (1949–2005), actor and former resident, who died in town
- Jeptha Root Simms (1807–1883) historian and geologist, born in Canterbury
- Loren P. Waldo (1802–1881), U.S. Representative
- Joseph Williamson, born in Canterbury and President of Maine Senate
- William Durkee Williamson (1779–1846) a governor of Maine (1821) was born in town
