= Griswold High School =

Griswold High School may refer to one of these U.S. schools:

- Griswold High School (Connecticut)
- Griswold High School (Helix, Oregon)
- Griswold High School (Iowa)
