= William Jillson Stone House =

Historic house in Connecticut, United States

- U.S. National Register of Historic Places
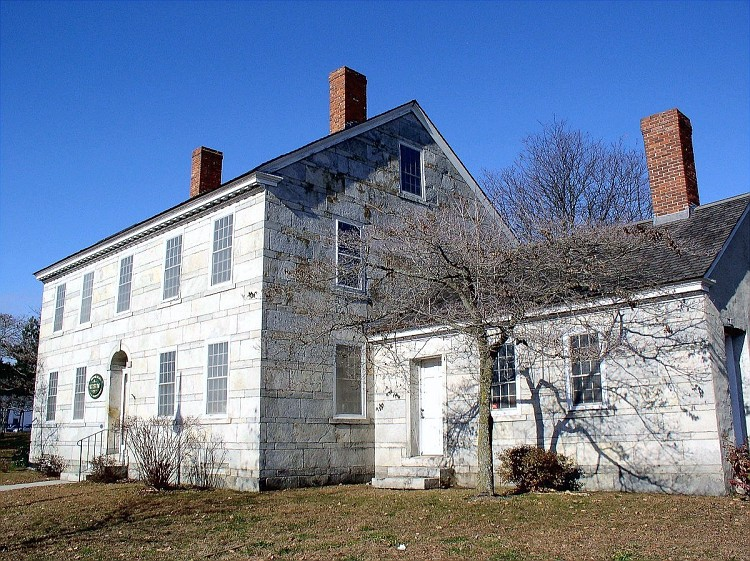

- Location within Connecticut Location within the United States
- Location: 561 Main Street, Willimantic, Connecticut
- Coordinates: 41°42′40″N 72°12′38″W
- Area: 1 acre (0.40 ha)
- Built: 1825
- NRHP reference No.: 71000912
- Added to NRHP: August 05, 1971

The William Jillson Stone House is a historic house museum at 561 Main Street inside Jillson Square Park, in the Willimantic section of Windham, Connecticut. Built in 1825–27, it is a rare local instance of a stone house, built by one of the area's early industrialists. It is now maintained by the Windham Historical Society, and was listed on the National Register of Historic Places in 1971.

== Description and history ==
The William Jillson Stone House is located on the south side of Jillson Square Park, overlooking Main Street and the Willimantic River. It is a two-story structure, built of native granite laid in alternating wide and narrow courses. Its walls are roughly 17 inches (43 cm) thick. A single-story ell extends to the right, at a recess from the front facade. The front facade is five bays wide, with the main entrance at the center, set in a rounded-arch opening. The interior follows a center hall plan, with relatively simple woodwork trimming the openings and the fireplaces.

The house is locally significant as a rare example of a stone house, and as the home of William Jillson, a native of Cumberland, Rhode Island, who was one of the first people to purchase industrial water rights at the Willimantic Falls. Jillson and his brothers established several mills in the area, which grew to become the American Thread Company, Willimantic's leading employer for many years. The house is built out of the same materials that were used in construction of some of the mills, quarried out of the river bed.

After Jillson died, the house was divided up into apartments, and was also used as storage by one of the mills for a time. It returned to single family ownership in 1920. It was rescued from demolition by local preservationists, and underwent restoration in the 1970s by the historical society. Its rooms are decorated to depict a typical early 19th-century industrialist's home.

== See also ==
- National Register of Historic Places listings in Windham County, Connecticut
