= Israel Putnam School =

- U.S. National Register of Historic Places
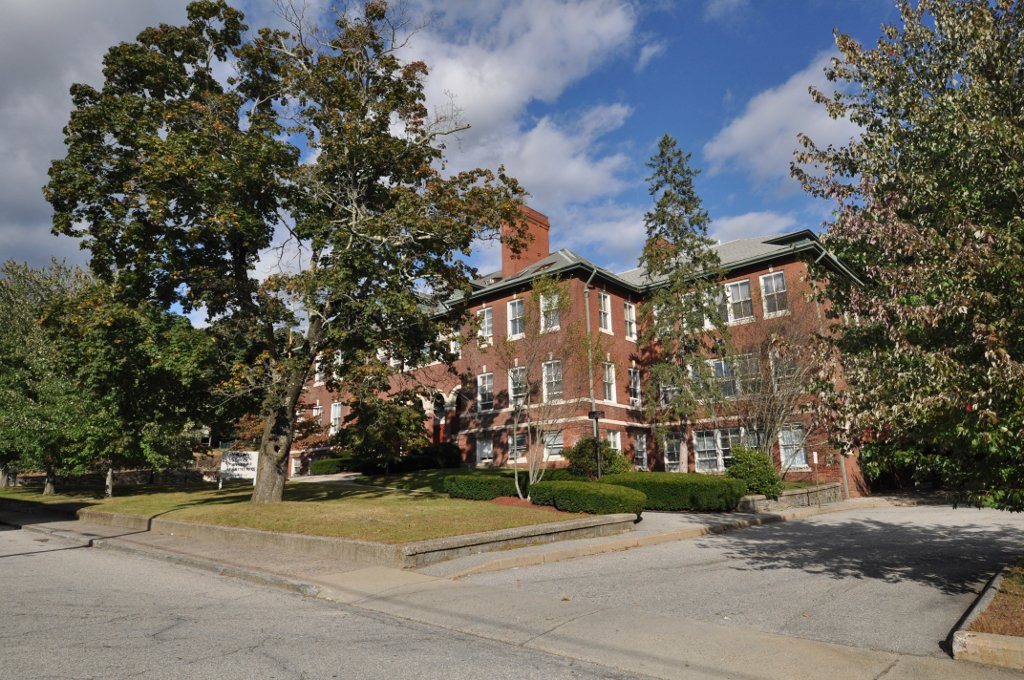

- Location within Connecticut Location within the United States
- Location: 97 School Street, Putnam, Connecticut
- Coordinates: 41°54′58″N 71°54′21″W
- Area: 2.7 acres (1.1 ha)
- Built: 1902
- Architect: J.C. Fowler, E.I. Wilson
- Architectural style: Classical Revival, Renaissance
- NRHP reference No.: 84000788
- Added to NRHP: December 13, 1984

The Israel Putnam School is a historic school in Putnam, Connecticut. The school, named in honor of Israel Putnam, is a two-story Classical Revival brick building with limestone trim built in 1902. It was the town's first modern school building, and the first to include an auditorium. The building was listed on the National Register of Historic Places in 1984. It has been converted to residences.

== Description and history ==
The former Israel Putnam School is located east of the city's central business district, at the southwest corner of School and Oak Streets. It has a large central block with smaller flanking wings, and a matching two-story addition extending to the rear, built in 1922. Windows are set in rectangular openings, with limestone keystones and sills. The main entrance is at the center, recessed in an arcade of five arched openings, which extends into the nearly fully exposed basement level.

Prior to the construction of this building, the students of Putnam's urban core were educated in a two-story wood frame building that had classes divided by grade. The city experienced a surge in growth around 1900, and that school as judged inadequate. This building was designed by John Chandler Fowler and Edward I. Wilson, both of Boston, Massachusetts but not apparently in formal partnership, and was completed in 1902. It was the city's first school building to include an auditorium, and was specifically designed with an imposing architectural facade to convey seriousness of purpose.

== See also ==
- National Register of Historic Places listings in Windham County, Connecticut
