= Jillson Square Park =

Park in Willimantic, Connecticut, United States

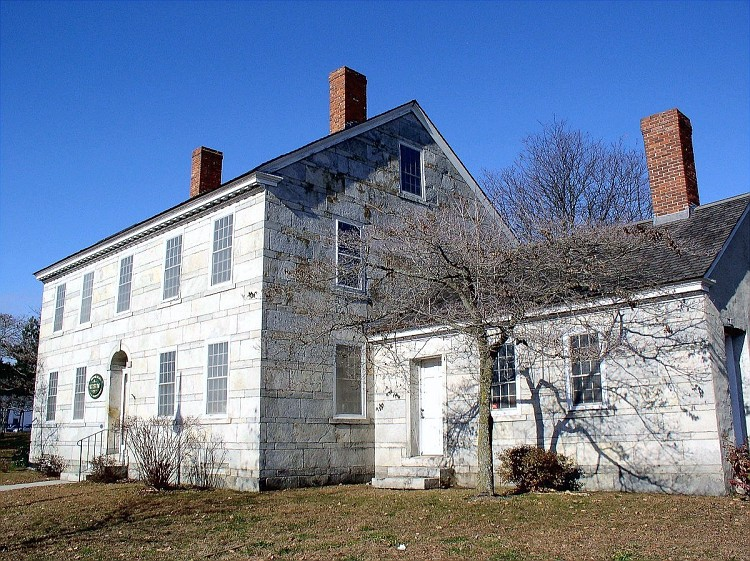
- The William Jillson Stone House on the property

- Location within Connecticut
- Type: Village green
- Location: Willimantic, Connecticut
- Coordinates: 41.7120°N 72.2092°W
- Area: 258,622 square feet (24,026.8 m^{2})
- Created: 1972-1976
- Operator: Town of Windham Recreation Department

Jillson Square Park is park located in Willimantic, Connecticut. It holds the William Jillson Stone House on its area, and is home to the Willimantic Carnival. The park was created after the Windham Historical Society bought the property in 1972, and gave the area to the Town of Windham Recreation Department for park development. The park was the former land of William Jillson, the creator of the Jillson Mills nearby. The Air Line Trail starts less than 200 feet (61 m) away from here.
