= First Congregational Church of Plainfield =

Historic church in Connecticut, United States

- U.S. National Register of Historic Places
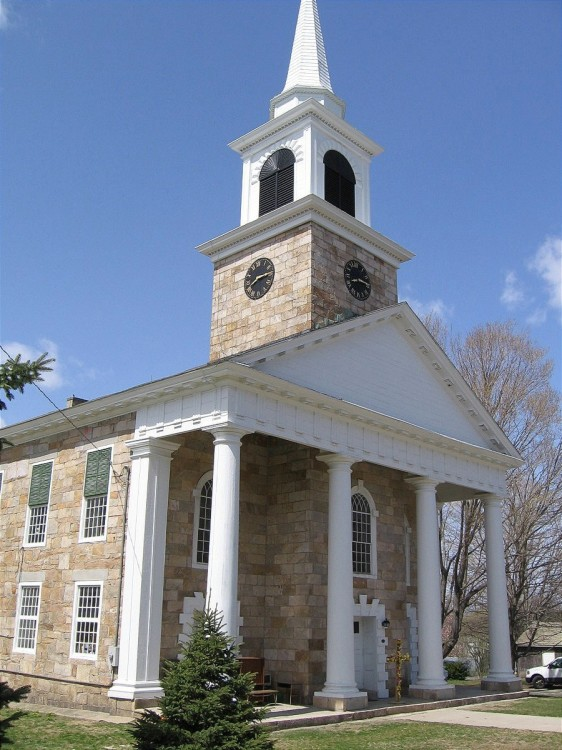

- Location within Connecticut Location within the United States
- Location: 519 Norwich Road, Plainfield, Connecticut
- Coordinates: 41°41′6″N 71°54′55″W
- Area: less than one acre
- Built: 1816
- Architect: Town, Ithiel
- Architectural style: Federal
- NRHP reference No.: 86002116
- Added to NRHP: July 31, 1986

The First Congregational Church of Plainfield is a historic Congregational church at 519 Norwich Road in Plainfield, Connecticut. It was built in 1816, for a congregation founded in 1705, to plans by noted early architect Ithiel Town, and is a relative rarity in the state as a Federal period stone church. The church was listed on the National Register of Historic Places in 1986. The congregation is affiliated with the United Church of Christ.

== Architecture and history ==
Plainfield's First Congregational Church is located on the north side of the town's main village, on the west side of Norwich Road (Connecticut Route 12) south of Cemetery Road. It is a 2 1/2-story stone structure, built out of locally quarried fieldstone. It has a projecting gable-front Doric temple front supported by four columns, and a multistage tower with steeple. The first stage of the tower is stone, and houses a clock with faces on three sides. The second stage is a wood-frame belfry, with louvered round-arch openings.

The church was built in 1816, after a gale destroyed the previous colonial meeting house. It is a significant early work of Ithiel Town, a native of nearby Thompson who became a leading architect of the early 19th century. Its interior was subjected to significant alterations in the 1850s, and no longer reflect Town's design. In addition to its religious role, this building also hosted town meetings and other civic functions during the 19th century.

== See also ==
- National Register of Historic Places listings in Windham County, Connecticut
