= Mathew Bowen Homestead =

Historic house in Connecticut, United States

- U.S. National Register of Historic Places
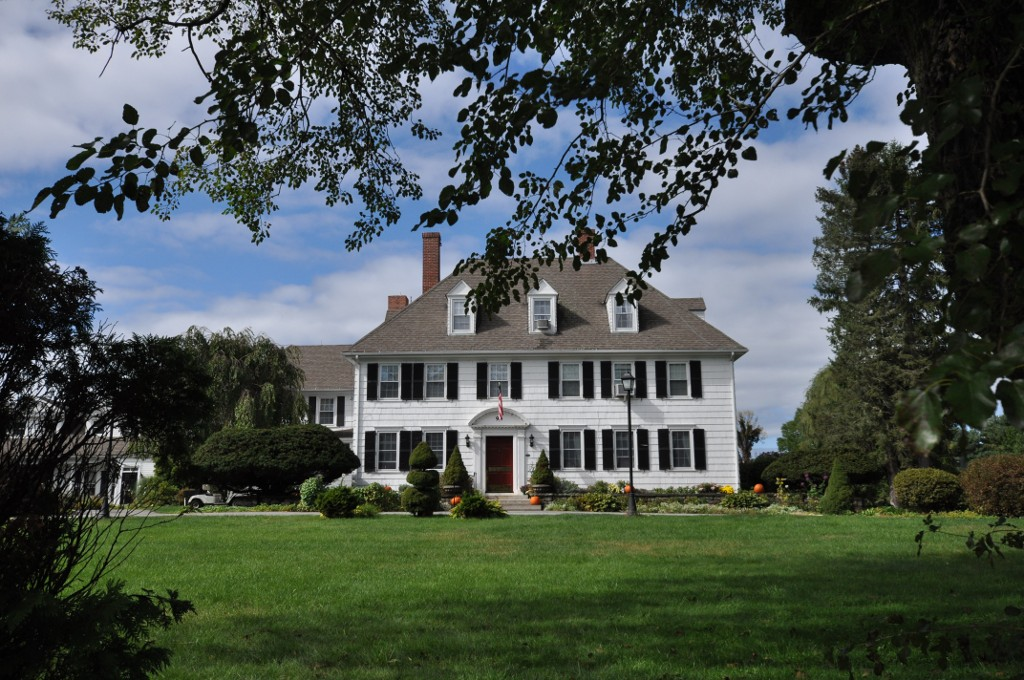

- Location within Connecticut Location within the United States
- Location: 94 Plaine Hill Road., Woodstock, Connecticut
- Coordinates: 41°56′33″N 71°58′25″W
- Area: 14.3 acres (5.8 ha)
- Built: 1816
- Architect: Truesdale, Walter; Fisher, Richard Arnold
- Architectural style: Georgian, Federal, Federal Revival
- NRHP reference No.: 87000859
- Added to NRHP: September 10, 1987

The Matthew Bowen Homestead, also once known as the Plaine Hill Farm, is a historic house at 94 Plaine Hill Road in Woodstock, Connecticut. It is now the Inn at Woodstock. Built in 1816, it is a prominent and well-preserved example of a Federal period farmstead, with a long history of association with the locally prominent Bowen family. The property was listed on the National Register of Historic Places in 1987.

== Description and history ==
The Matthew Bowen Homestead stands on over 14 acres (5.7 ha) just west of the junction of Plaine Hill Road with Connecticut Route 169. It consists of a five-building farm complex on 14.3 acres (5.8 ha) of land, located southwest of Woodstock Hill. The main house of the complex is a 2 1/2-story wood-frame structure, six bays wide, with a tall hip roof. It was built in 1816, and underwent two major periods of alteration before achieving its present configuration. Originally five bays wide, Victorian porches and a turret were added in the 1880s, but largely removed in the late 1920s, at which time it was extended to six bays. The house is connected to 19th-century farm buildings, including two barns and a carriage house. A 1930s vintage Cape house stands at a remove from the main complex.

The farmhouse was built in 1816 by William Bowen. It underwent several alterations and enlargements by later members of the Bowen, including the addition of a carriage house around the time of the American Civil War, and an extensive enlargement conducted in the 1880s by Henry Chandler Bowen, owner of the National Historic Landmark Roseland Cottage in Woodstock Hill. The interior of the house was given a major Federal Revival alteration in 1929, work that included the construction of the nearby Cape. The property remained as farmland until 1982, when it passed out of the Bowen family.

== See also ==
- National Register of Historic Places listings in Windham County, Connecticut
