= Putnam High School =

Location
- 152 Woodstock Avenue; Putnam, Windham County, Connecticut 06260; United States; 41.9222°N 71.9173°W

Information
- Type: Public high school
- Founded: 1874
- School district: Putnam School District
- NCES District ID: 0903480
- Superintendent: Steven Rioux
- CEEB code: 070630
- NCES School ID: 090348000719
- Principal: Heather Taylor
- Teaching staff: 25.58 (FTE)
- Grades: 9–12
- Gender: Coeducational
- Enrollment: 271 (2023–2024)
- Student to teacher ratio: 10.59
- Campus type: Suburban
- Colors: Blue and white
- Athletics conference: Eastern Connecticut Conference
- Nickname: Clippers
- USNWR ranking: 5,068
- Website: www.putnamschoolsct.org/putnam-high-school

Putnam High School (abbreviated as PHS) is a public high school in Putnam, Connecticut, United States.

== History ==
The original school building at 126 Church Street was constructed in 1874. It was added to the National Register of Historic Places in 1993, and is now used as the Putnam Town Hall. The present school was built in 1955 on Schoolhouse Drive off Woodstock Avenue and a new wing was added in 1970. A second addition was completed in 1994 which houses the technical education department, CAD lab, weight room, and television studio. From 2014 to 2017, the high school has undergone renovations to expand the school and remove an outbreak of asbestos beneath the flooring. Part of this renovation included an all new gymnasium, bullet proof windows, and a new modern look. The auditorium was removed and replaced with a small theater room.

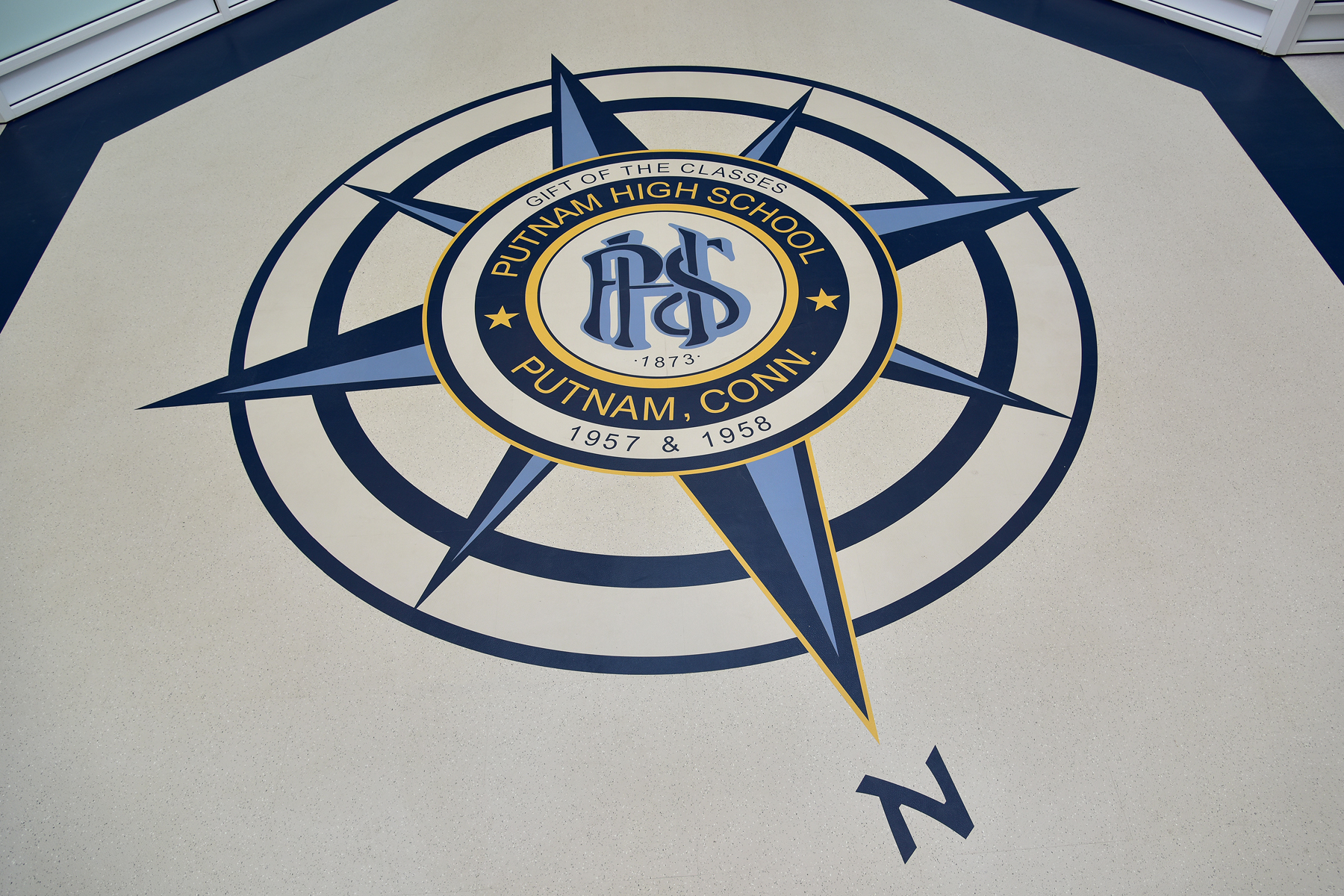
This new seal replaced the old asbestos-infected seal, while still giving credit to the original class.

== Athletics ==
Putnam High School's athletic programs, nicknamed the Clippers, have captured four Connecticut Interscholastic Athletic Conference State Championships. The Putnam High football team defeated Haddam-Killingworth 20-14 for the 1994 Class S Championship. The Clippers lost championship games to Ansonia in 1984 and to Trinity Catholic in 1993. The Putnam boys basketball team won the Class S championship in 1986 against Portland 60–58. The team lost the championship game in 1929, 1930, 1956, 1995 and 2006. The baseball team won the 1985 Class S title, topping Thomaston 7–3. The Clipper softball team defeated Old Saybrook 7-1 for the 1989 Class S Championship, and was runner-up in 1991 and 1992.

Putnam High School joined the Eastern Connecticut Conference (ECC) in the 2000–2001 school year. They switched to the Constitution State Conference (CSC) in the 2010–2011 school year. Putnam High School would rejoin the Eastern Connecticut Conference (ECC) in the 2018–2019 school year.

=== CIAC State Championships ===
Team	Year
Football	1994
Baseball	1985
Boys Basketball	1986
Boys Indoor Track	1949, 1952, 1953
Boys Outdoor Track	1952, 1953
Softball	1989

=== ECC Championships (2000-2010)(2019-Current) ===
Team	Year
Boys Golf	2009

=== CSC Championships (2010-2018) ===
Team	Year
Girls Soccer	2012, 2015, 2016

== Administration ==
The principal of Putnam High School is Heather Taylor as of April 14, 2021.

=== Past administrators ===
- 1880 Principal Burnette
- 1886 Principal A. F. Amadon
- 1889-? Professor George F. Jewett of New Brunswick, New Jersey
- ?-1905 Principal Harrison F Gay

== Cheerleading ==
The cheerleading squad won the ECC Cheer Championships in 2001, 2002, 2008, and 2009. In 2002, the Class "S" was dissolved for the competition and Putnam competed in Class "M." The Class "S" division was resumed thereafter. In the 2001 State Championships the cheerleading squad finished 4th in Class "S," coming in 1 point behind Ellington, missing the 3rd-place finish. They finished Top 5 in 1999 and 2001. They finished Top 10 in 1999, 2000, 2001, 2007, and 2008. In 2009 at the State Championships the cheerleading squad placed third in the Class "S" division.
