= Central Village Historic District =

Historic district in Connecticut, US

- U.S. National Register of Historic Places
- U.S. Historic district
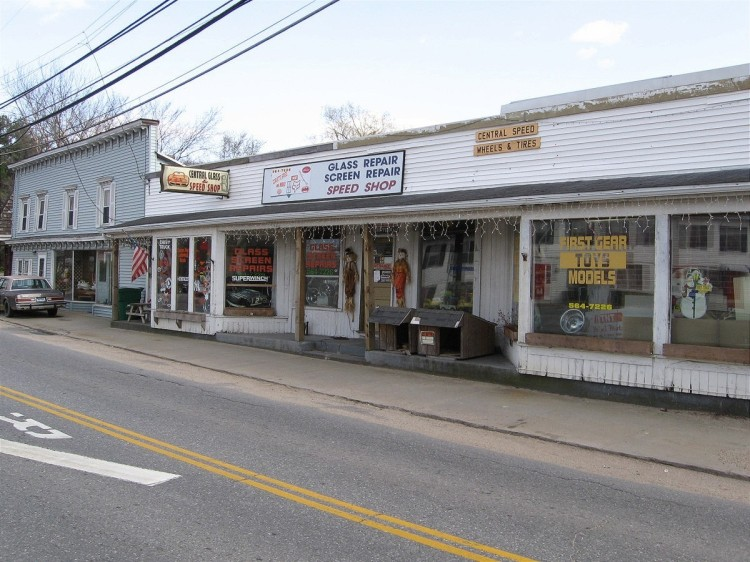
- Shops in the center of Plainfield

- Location within Connecticut Location within the United States
- Location: Roughly, School, Main and Water Streets, and Putnam Road North to Plainfield High School, Plainfield, Connecticut
- Coordinates: 41°43′6″N 71°54′21″W
- Area: 130 acres (53 ha)
- Architect: Plainfield Woolen Company
- Architectural style: Bungalow/Craftsman, Greek Revival, Italianate
- NRHP reference No.: 91000949
- Added to NRHP: August 9, 1991

The Central Village Historic District is a historic district in the Central Village area of Plainfield, Connecticut, United States that was listed on the National Register of Historic Places (NRHP) in 1991. It encompasses a late 19th-century historic mill village, including a small commercial center where Connecticut Route 12 and 14 meet, a cluster of architecturally distinguished buildings built by mill owners and managers, and a collection of mill worker housing units. It includes the Plainfield Woolen Company Mill, which is separately listed, as well as archaeological remnants of other mill infrastructure. It also includes Plainfield's old town hall (built 1872) and high school (built 1924). Other architecturally prominent buildings include the c. 1855 Italianate mansion of mill owner Arthur Fenner, and the 1845 Greek Revival Congregational Church.

The area that is now Central Village was a typical agricultural area until 1814, when a consortium of locals built a small cotton mill on the banks of the Moosup River. This enterprise gradually expanded, with the owners building housing for the mill workers, creating a small village. In 1845, the Central Manufacturing Company, then the village's largest employer, built a brick mill. The village's growth was encouraged by the arrival of the railroad in 1839, which was run midway between two mill locations. The cotton mills declined in the late 19th century, but its economy was propped up by other industries until the early 20th century, when the Plainfield Woolen Company revived the textile industry, building the principal surviving mill building.

== See also ==
- National Register of Historic Places listings in Windham County, Connecticut
