= Capt. Seth Chandler House =

Historic house in Connecticut, United States

- U.S. National Register of Historic Places
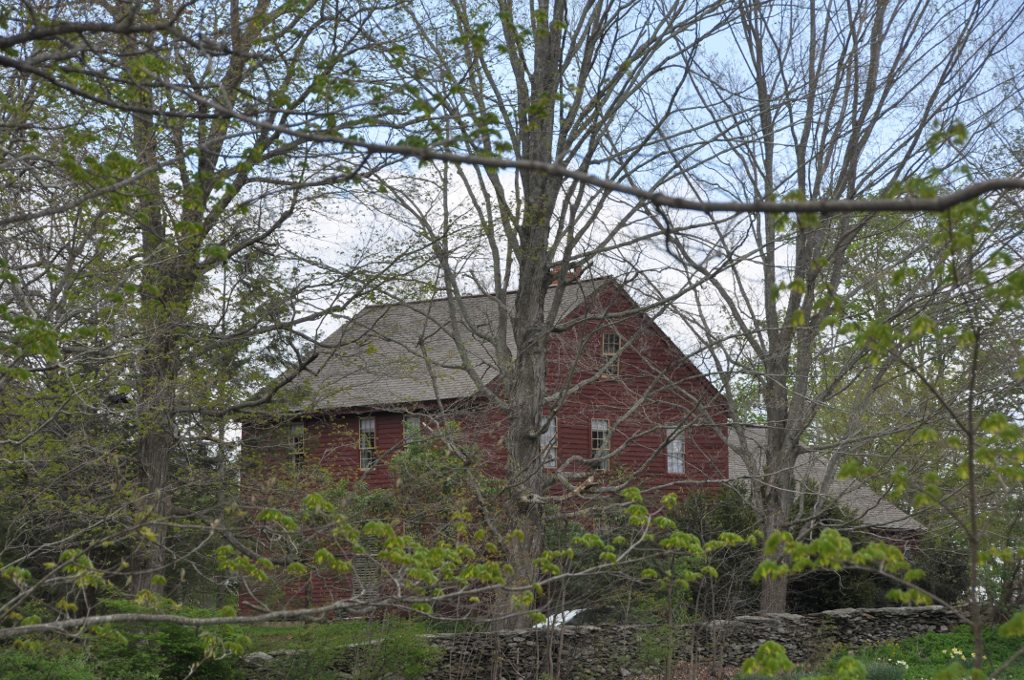

- Location within Connecticut Location within the United States
- Location: 55 Converse Street, Woodstock, Connecticut
- Coordinates: 42°0′49″N 71°58′7″W
- Area: 9.75 acres (3.95 ha)
- Built: 1760
- Architectural style: Colonial
- NRHP reference No.: 93001380
- Added to NRHP: December 15, 1993

The Captain Seth Chandler House is a historic house in the East Woodstock section of Woodstock, Connecticut. With a construction history dating to 1760, it has a number of unusual features and form for a rurally sited house of that period, including unusually fine stonework in the chimney and stencilled plaster. The house was listed on the National Register of Historic Places in 1993.

== Description and history ==
The Captain Seth Chandler House is located in a rural setting of eastern Woodstock, on the east side of Converse Street, a short way north of its junction with Old Turnpike ROad (Connecticut Route 197). It is a two-story wood-frame structure, with an unusual form and floor plan for its c. 1760 construction date. Its large chimney, instead of being centrally located, is set well back from the main roof ridge. The interior layout is consistent with a typical south-facing colonial house of the period, with a narrow winding stair on the south side of the chimney, and public rooms on either side. However, the roof gable (which would normally run east–west in such a configuration) runs north–south, and the main entrance, facing west in a three-bay gable end facade, opens into the southern parlor. A single-story ell is attached to the rear; it was added later in the 18th century, and may have originally been a separate structure. The interior is notable for its period woodwork and stenciled artwork on its walls.

The land on which the house stands was purchased in 1760 by Captain Seth Chandler, and the first portion of the house, its west side, was probably built soon afterward. Chandler had just married, and the house was enlarged about 1780, in order to accommodate his large family (they had 11 children). It remained in the Chandler family until 1867, and then in the Converse family until 1983.

== See also ==
- National Register of Historic Places listings in Windham County, Connecticut
