= Plainfield Woolen Company Mill =

- U.S. National Register of Historic Places
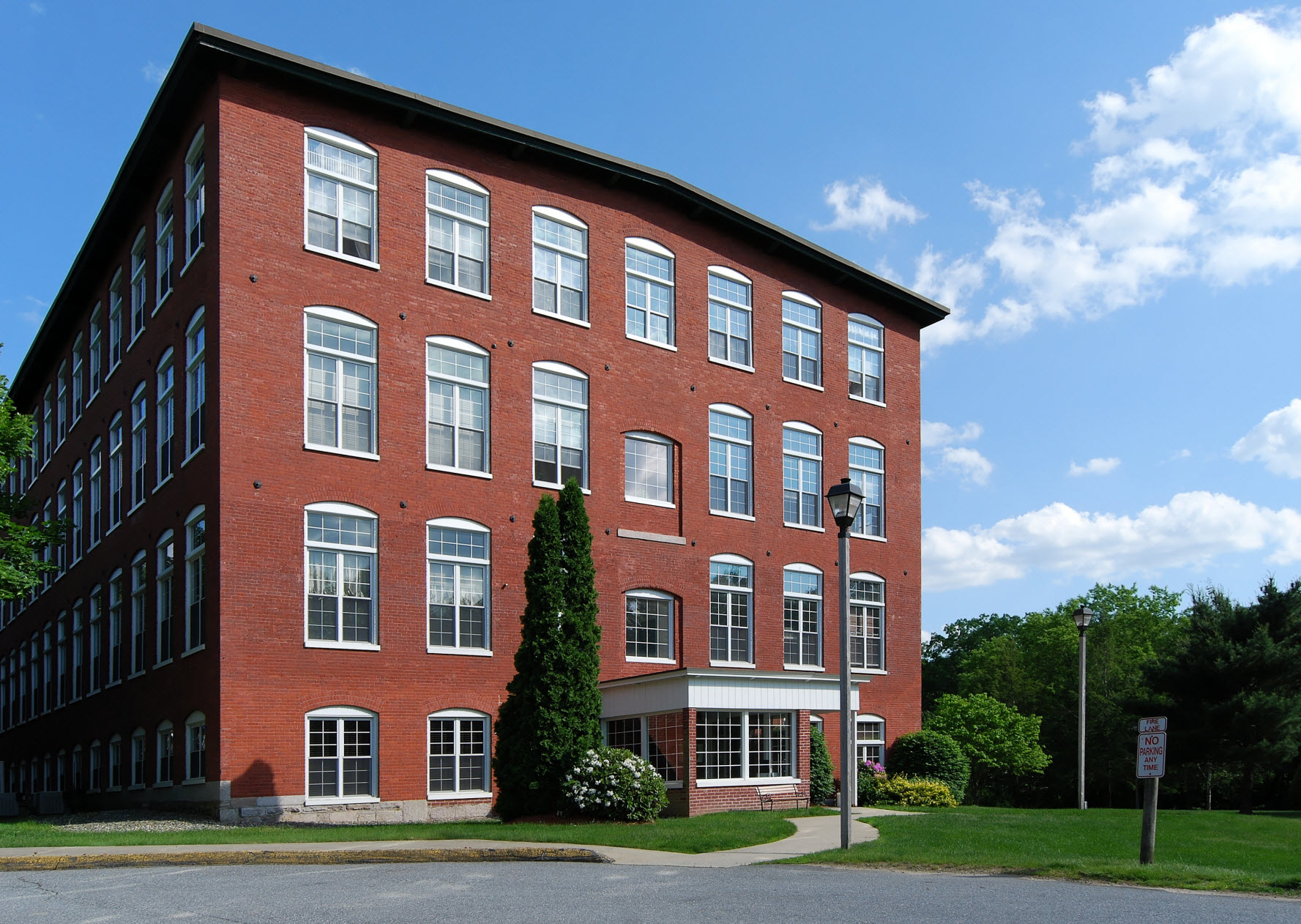

- Location within Connecticut Location within the United States
- Location: Main Street, Plainfield, Connecticut
- Coordinates: 41°43′11″N 71°54′25″W
- Area: 8 acres (3.2 ha)
- Built: 1901
- Architect: Franklin, Hiram
- NRHP reference No.: 85001919
- Added to NRHP: August 29, 1985

The Plainfield Woolen Company Mill is a historic mill building on Main Street in Plainfield, Connecticut. Built in 1901, the building played a vital role in revitalizing the local economy, which was stagnating at the time. It remained the site of active textile manufacturing until 1984. The building is a visually distinctive landmark in the community, in part because of its unusual monitor roof. The building was listed on the National Register of Historic Places in 1985. It has been converted into condominia.

== Description and history ==
The Plainfield Woolen Company is located on the south side of the town's Centre Village, on the west side of Main Street near its junction with Norwich Road. It stands on 8 acres (3.2 ha) bounded by the road and the Moosup River, historically its source of power. The mill pond is southeast of the plant. The mill is composed of a series of attached brick buildings, roughly forming a J shape. The main structure of the complex is four stories in height, and is covered by a roof with a monitor section at its center.

The site of the mill had been used at least since 1827, when a textile mill was established there. By the later decades of the 19th century, that mill had suffered from repeated flooding and increasing competition from more efficient producers, and had failed. The size and scale of the Plainfield Woolen Company operation was larger, and was focused in the production of high end woolen fabrics for use in men's suits and coats. At its peak it employed 300 people, with the machinery mainly operated by men. The mill remained in some sort of textile production, under a series of ownership changes, until 1984.

== See also ==
- National Register of Historic Places listings in Windham County, Connecticut
