= New Roxbury Ironworks Site =

Archaeological site in Connecticut, United States

- U.S. National Register of Historic Places
- Location: Woodstock, Connecticut
- Area: less than one acre
- Built: 1757
- Architect: Ebenezer Lyons
- NRHP reference No.: 96000130
- Added to NRHP: February 23, 1996

The New Roxbury Ironworks Site is a historic industrial archaeological site in Woodstock, Connecticut. It is the site of a colonial-era iron foundry, established about 1760 in the vicinity of Black Pond. It was built to process iron ore that had been found by area settlers. The area was also later the site of grist and saw mills.

The site was listed on the National Register of Historic Places in 1996.

== See also ==
- National Register of Historic Places listings in Windham County, Connecticut
