= George Pickering Nichols House =

Historic house in Connecticut, United States

- U.S. National Register of Historic Places
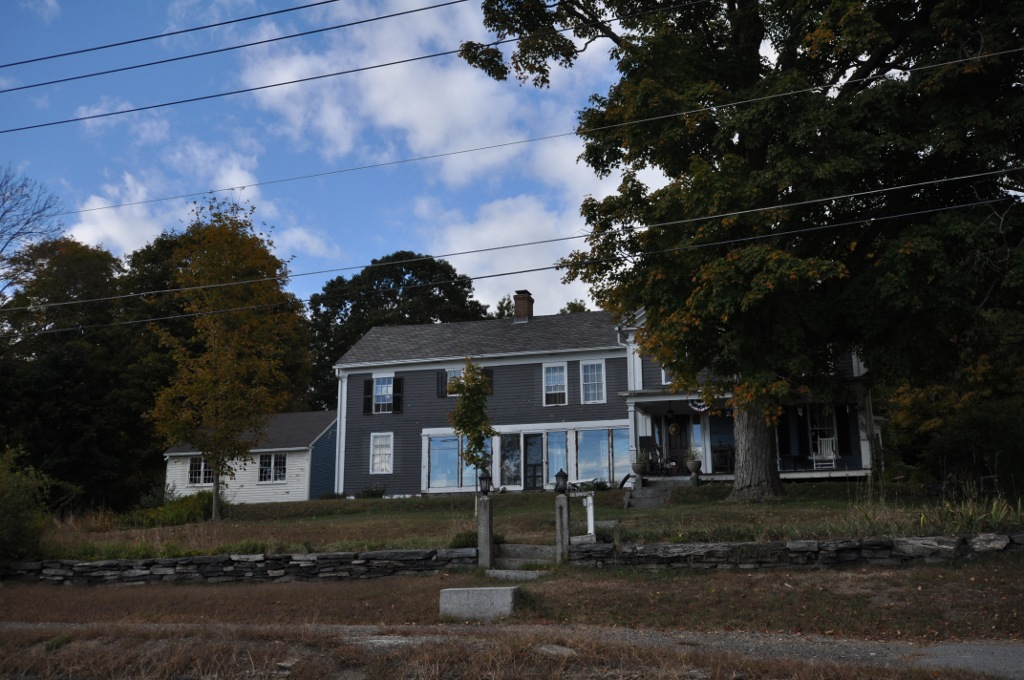

- Location within Connecticut Location within the United States
- Location: 42 Thompson Road, Thompson, Connecticut
- Coordinates: 41°56′51″N 71°53′4″W
- Area: 1.4 acres (0.57 ha)
- Architectural style: Greek Revival
- NRHP reference No.: 91000990
- Added to NRHP: July 31, 1991

The George Pickering Nichols House is a historic house in Thompson, Connecticut. Built about 1846, it is a well-preserved example of rural Greek Revival architecture. It was listed on the National Register of Historic Places in 1991.

== Description and history ==
The George Pickering Nichols House is located in Central Southern Thompson, on the North Side of Thompson Road (Connecticut Route 193) a few hundred feet west of where it passes under Interstate 395. It is a 2 1/2-story wood-frame structure, three bays wide, with a front gable roof and a single-story hip-roofed front porch extending across the front. A long two-story wing extends to the west (left) of the main block. The corners of the building are pilasters, supporting a frieze and entablature at the cornice. A polygonal bay, added c. 1880, projects from the east side of the main block, and is decorated with brackets. The interior retains a number of original features, including wide pine floors and horsehair plaster walls.

The house was built c. 1846 by George Pickering Nichols, who came from a family of early area settlers. It was occupied by the Nichols family for nearly a century. It was the centerpiece of a 260-acre (110 ha) farm, portions of which were taken for construction of the highway, and other parts were sold off for development. After it was sold out of the family, it was converted into a two-family, but it has since been converted back to single-family use, with significant elements of its 19th-century appearance carefully reproduced.

== See also ==
- National Register of Historic Places listings in Windham County, Connecticut
