= Old Westfield Cemetery =

Historic site in Windham County, Connecticut

- U.S. National Register of Historic Places
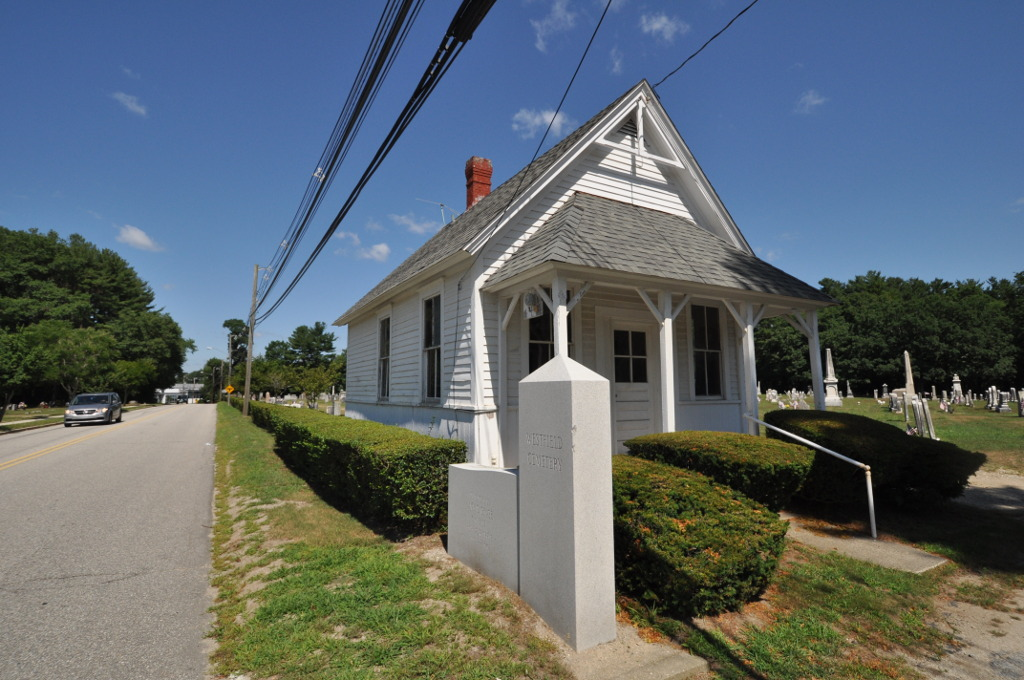

- Location within Connecticut Location within the United States
- Location: 320 North Street, Killingly, Connecticut
- Coordinates: 41°49′8″N 71°53′21″W
- Area: 10 acres (4.0 ha)
- Built: 1728
- NRHP reference No.: 10000578
- Added to NRHP: August 26, 2010

The Old Westfield Cemetery is located at 320 North Street in the Danielson borough of Killingly, Connecticut. The cemetery was established in 1720, not long after Killingly's incorporation (1708). It occupies a 10-acre (4.0 ha) parcel on the North Side of North Street, and is bounded in part by the Five Mile River. Its main entry is marked by granite pillars placed in 1920, giving access to a perimeter road. The cemetery is laid out in a form typical of 18th-century and early 19th-century, with graves lined up in relatively even rows, avoiding the mid-19th century rural cemetery movement. Most of its 450 graves date to the 19th century. The cemetery was listed on the National Register of Historic Places in 2010.

Killingly was settled in 1707, when James Daniels purchased the area between the Quinebaug River and the Rhode Island border from James Fitch. Daniels is considered the founder of the village of Danielson, and is buried in this cemetery. It was laid out in 1728, and remained in continuous use until about 1900, when additional space on the South Side of North Street was added. Most burials now take place in the modern southern parcel, although burials still take place in family plots in the old section. About 15% of the graves date to the 18th century, typically with slate stones carved with cherubs or winged soul effigies. The larger number of 19th-century burials have a wider variety of monuments, including the use of granite and marble. The most elaborate family monument is that of the Atwoods in the Northeast quadrant, which features a Classical statue and drapery.

== See also ==
- National Register of Historic Places listings in Windham County, Connecticut
