= Griswold (automobile) =

Defunct American motor vehicle manufacturer

The Griswold was an American automobile manufactured in Detroit, Michigan by the Griswold Motor Car Company in 1907. The Griswold was offered with three different chassis, with two-cylinder water-cooled engines rated at 10 hp, 15 hp, and 20 hp each. The track was an unusual 4 ft 7 in (1.40 m) size.
