= Griswold House =

Griswold House may refer to:

- Griswold House (Sausalito, California), listed on the National Register of Historic Places (NRHP) in Marin County, California
- Griswold House (Guilford, Connecticut), listed on the NRHP in New Haven County, Connecticut
- Florence Griswold House, Old Lyme, Connecticut, now part of the Florence Griswold Museum
- John N. A. Griswold House, Newport, Rhode Island, a National Historic Landmark and NRHP-listed in Newport County, Rhode Island
