= Hezekiah S. Ramsdell Farm =

- U.S. National Register of Historic Places
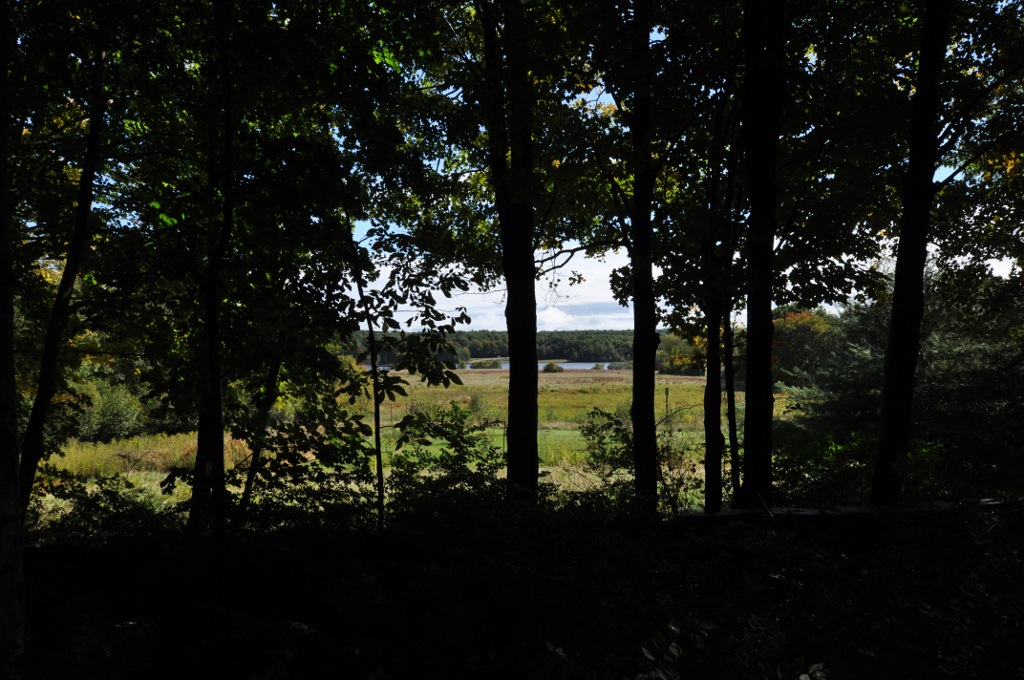
- View from the farm site to West Thompson Reservoir

- Location within Connecticut Location within the United States
- Location: West Thompson Reservoir lands, formerly Ramsdell Road, Thompson, Connecticut
- Coordinates: 41°57′7″N 71°54′39″W
- Area: 10 acres (4.0 ha)
- Architectural style: Greek Revival, Federal, Pennsylvania style
- NRHP reference No.: 90000442
- Added to NRHP: August 23, 1990

The Hezekiah S. Ramsdell Farm was a historic farm in Thompson, Connecticut. It was located on what was once known as Ramsdell Road, but is now a hiking trail on the lands surrounding West Thompson Reservoir. The property was made famous by a standoff between the United States Army Corps of Engineers (USACE) and Alice Ramsdell, the feisty owner of the property who refused to leave after USACE acquired it by eminent domain as part of a flood control project in the 1960s. The dispute, highlighted by an incident in which Miss Ramsdell supposedly met government officials holding a shotgun, was ended when the government acquiesced to her demand to stay on the property. The farm was added to the National Register of Historic Places in 1990.

== History ==
The farm was purchased in 1825 by Hezekiah Ramsdell, an itinerant Methodist minister. The main house was believed to date to about 1736, and was an example of a regionally distinctive Georgian style, with brick end walls. Alice Ramsdell grew up on the farm, learning how to maintain and operate the equipment, and tending to a small apple orchard. In 1955, the nearby Quinebaug River suffered one of the worst floods on record, one of a number of Connecticut's rivers to do so. In the aftermath of those floods the USACE developed plans to mitigate future flooding, which included construction of the West Thompson Reservoir. Of more than 50 landowners approached, Alice Ramsdell was the only one to refuse their offer of a buyout; she then also refused to vacate the premises after the property was taken by eminent domain. After the standoff, she was allowed to remain on the property, paying a nominal rent to the USACE.

Following the death of Alice Ramsdell in 1995, the USACE announced plans to demolish the farm buildings, which had deteriorated in her later years. The buildings were rescued and moved to a nearby farm on County Home Road. The original farm site is now accessible via a hiking trail.

== See also ==
- National Register of Historic Places listings in Windham County, Connecticut
