= Griswold High School (Connecticut) =

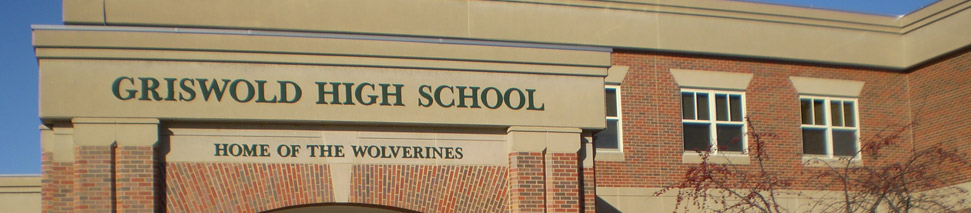

Location
- 267 Slater Avenue; Griswold, Connecticut 06351; United States; 41°35′51″N 71°58′49″W

Information
- Type: Public High School
- Established: 1936 (90 years ago)
- School district: Griswold Public Schools
- Superintendent: Sean P. McKenna
- CEEB code: 070325
- NCES School ID: 090174000311
- Principal: Erin Palonen
- Teaching staff: 51.60 (FTE)
- Grades: 9-12
- Enrollment: 578 (2023-2024)
- Student to teacher ratio: 11.20
- Campus: Griswold Public Schools
- Colors: Green and white
- Athletics conference: Eastern Connecticut Conference
- Mascot: Wolverine
- Nickname: GHS
- Yearbook: Sentinel
- Website: www.griswold.k12.ct.us/ghs

Griswold High School is the only public secondary school in Griswold, Connecticut, for grades 9 to 12. In addition to students promoted from Griswold Middle School, the school also enrolls students from the nearby towns of Canterbury, Franklin, Lisbon, Norwich, Preston, Sprague, and Voluntown. Griswold High School is part of Griswold Public Schools, supported by the Griswold Board of Education.

The original Griswold High School was constructed in 1936, and now serves as Griswold Middle School. The new Griswold High School was built in 1992 adjacent to the original School, and shares Griswold Public Schools' 70-acre campus along the Quinebaug River in northern New London County. Griswold High School's state-of-the-art facility features various labs for STEM programs (Sciences, Engineering, Manufacturing, Medical, Culinary, and an advanced-technology Nexus Lab for Computer-Aided Drafting and Design, Animation, coding, and esports), spacious classrooms, a modern Learning Commons library media center, a 600-seat auditorium and musical rehearsal spaces, a gymnasium, print-shop, athletic fields, nature trails, and more.

Griswold supplies Chromebooks for every student.

Facilities within Griswold High School are available for community use outside of school hours.

== Athletics ==
Griswold High School became a member of the Eastern Connecticut Conference (ECC) in 2000, when it merged with several schools from the Quinebaug Valley Conference (QVC). The Griswold sports teams are known as the Wolverines and compete in:

- American Football
  - State champions: 1964, 1974
- Baseball
  - CIAC state champions: 1969, 1970, 1974, 1975, 1978, 1981 (Class S)
- Basketball (boys & girls)
- Cross Country (boys & girls)
  - Boys state champions: 1990, 1991, 1995, 1996, 1998, 2000, 2001, 2002, 2003, 2004, 2005, 2006, 2007, 2022
  - Girls state champions: 2002, 2004, 2006, 2007, 2010, 2012
- Fencing - foil and épée (co-ed)
- Golf (co-ed)
- Lacrosse (boys co-op with Ledyard High School & girls)
- Soccer (boys & girls)
- Softball
  - State champions: 2003 (Class M)
- Indoor Track & Field (boys & girls)
  - Boys state champions: 1951, 2003, 2006
- Outdoor Track & Field (boys & girls)
  - Boys state champions: 1946, 2004, 2005, 2006
- Volleyball (girls)
- Wrestling (co-ed)
  - State champions: 2006, 2007, 2011
- Cheerleading

Griswold High School's football rivalry with Plainfield High School dates back to 1937; the Thanksgiving Day game tradition began in 1966.

== Notable alumni ==
- Sean Brackett (2009), Arena Football League quarterback
- Calvin Coffey (1969), Olympic Medalist
- Bill Dawley, former MLB pitcher
- Roger LaFrancois, former MLB catcher
