= Plainfield, Connecticut =

- Town
- Town of Plainfield
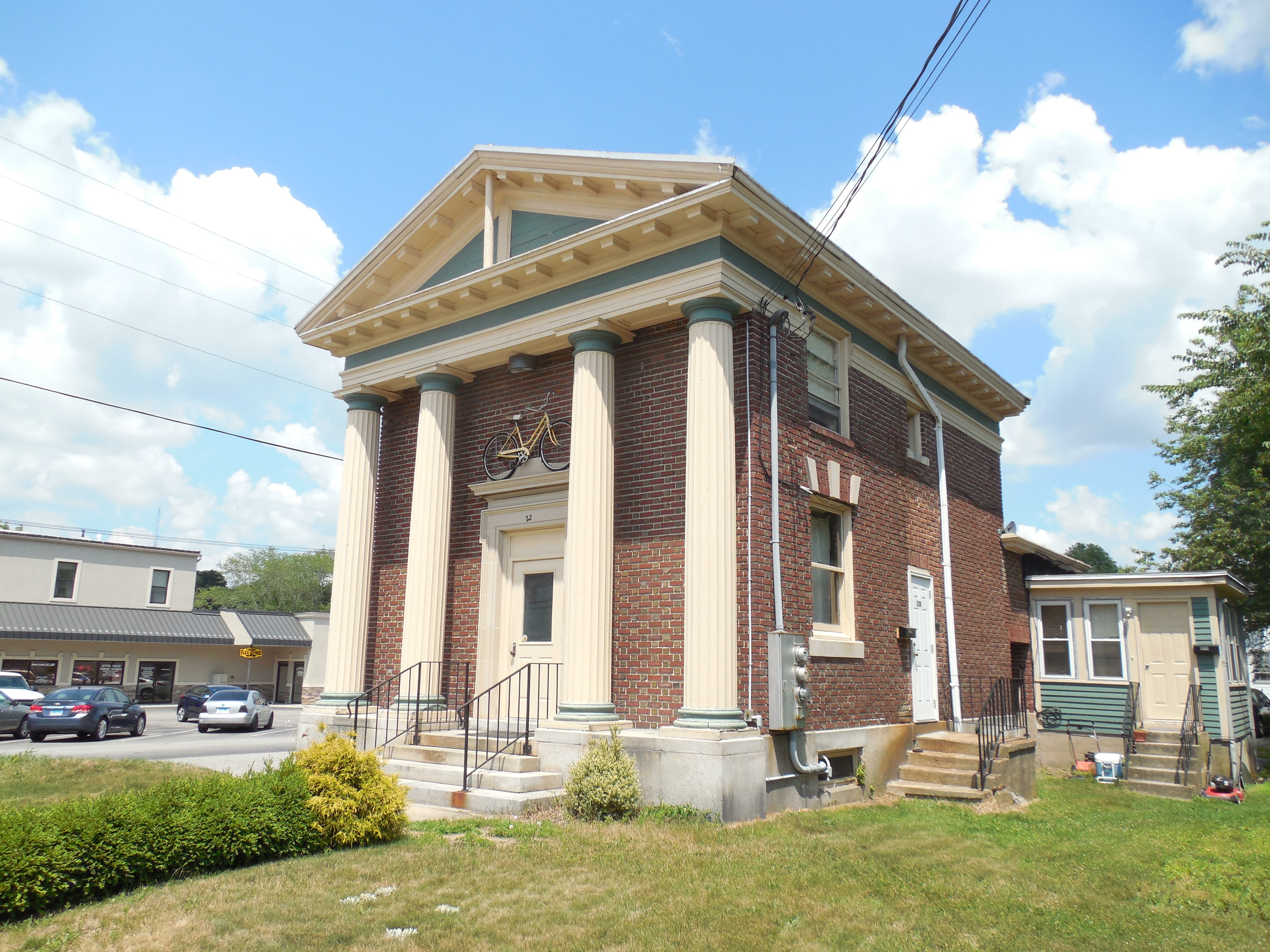
- Former bike shop that was repurposed to a barbershop in Plainfield Village

- Seal

- Coordinates: 41°42′N 71°54′W
- Country: United States
- U.S. state: Connecticut
- County: Windham
- Region: Northeastern CT
- Incorporated: 1699

Government
  - Type: Selectman-town meeting
  - First selectman: Kevin Cunningham
  - State Senator: Heather Somers (R-18th District)
  - State Reps.: Anne Dauphinais (R-44th District); Doug Dubitsky (R-47th District)

Area
  - Total: 43.0 sq mi (111.4 km^{2})
  - Land: 42.3 sq mi (109.5 km^{2})
  - Water: 0.77 sq mi (2.0 km^{2})
- Elevation: 400 ft (122 m)

Population (2020)
  - Total: 14,973
  - Density: 354/sq mi (136.7/km^{2})
- Time zone: UTC-5 (Eastern)
  - Summer (DST): UTC-4 (Eastern)
- ZIP code: 06354, 06374
- Area codes: 860/959
- FIPS code: 09-59980
- GNIS feature ID: 0213487
- Website: www.plainfieldct.org

Plainfield is a town in Windham County, Connecticut, United States. The town is part of the Northeastern Connecticut Planning Region. The population was 14,973 at the 2020 census. The town comprises four villages: Plainfield Village (south, ZIP code 06374), Moosup (northeast, 06354), Wauregan (northwest, 06387), and Central Village (west, 06332). Each village has their own respective United States Post Office and fire department. The entire town is serviced by the 860 area code.

== History ==
Plainfield was incorporated in 1699 as the town of Quinebaug and renamed the following year to its current name. The present name of "Plainfield" is descriptive of the original town site. Plainfield proved to be an industrial heavyweight in the 19th and early 20th centuries due largely to the ability of the Moosup and Quinebaug Rivers to provide power to the different mills throughout town. The job opportunities attracted French Canadian Americans, Irish Americans, British Americans, and people from other countries during the late 19th century. Combined with the mills, Plainfield had incredible commerce for a small town because four railways from Hartford, New York, Boston, and Providence intersected within the town. There was also a highly acclaimed school on Academy Hill, which is how the present Academy Hill Road got its name. Also, the town annually has the V-J Day parade, said to be the oldest in the United States.

Sites in Plainfield that are listed on the National Register of Historic Places are:

- Central Village Historic District, a historic district
- March Route of Rochambeau's Army: Old Canterbury Road

== Geography ==
Plainfield is located at: 41.6775 N, 71.9220 W.

According to the United States Census Bureau, the town has a total area of 43 square miles (110 km^{2}), of which 42.3 square miles (110 km^{2}) is land and 0.8 square miles (2.1 km^{2}) (1.81%) is water. From the southernmost point, Plainfield is 20 miles (32 km) inland of the Long Island Sound and Block Island Sound (Atlantic Ocean). Plainfield is the southernmost town of Windham County. The Quinebaug River generally forms the western border of the town. The Moosup River feeds the Quinebaug and runs across the northern portion of town.

== Transportation ==
Plainfield is bisected by the Connecticut Turnpike (I-395 and CT 695) and is serviced by three exits: Lathrop Road at exit 28, CT 14A at exit 29, and CT 14 at exit 32. All exits are off the I-395 portion of the Turnpike, which runs north and south. Exit 35 off I-395 North is in Plainfield, but does not offer access to any Plainfield streets. CT 12 generally runs parallel to the west of the Turnpike, and is less than one-half mile from all three Turnpike exits.

There is no direct air, passenger rail, or navigable water access to Plainfield, although the town is serviced by the Providence and Worcester Railroad (freight only), which also parallels the Connecticut Turnpike corridor. There is limited public transport system available in the town; combined with a lack of a sidewalk and/or segregated cycle facilities network and the large area of the town, this necessitates that most transit is done by car.

Providence, RI is the closest major city, 30 miles (48 km) to the east. Hartford is 40 miles (64 km) west. Boston, Mass is 60 miles (97 km) northeast; New York City (Manhattan), NY is 120 miles (190 km) southwest. The closest international airport is T. F. Green Airport (PVD) in Warwick, RI. Nearby Amtrak passenger rail stations include New London (NLC) and Providence (PVD); both are roughly 40 minute drives. New London is also served by the Shore Line East commuter railroad, and Providence by Massachusetts Bay Transportation Authority (MBTA) Commuter Rail.

== Demographics ==
Historical population
Census	Pop.	Note	%±
1820	2,097		—
1840	2,383		—
1850	2,732		14.6%
1860	3,665		34.2%
1870	4,521		23.4%
1880	4,021		−11.1%
1890	4,582		14.0%
1900	4,821		5.2%
1910	6,719		39.4%
1920	7,926		18.0%
1930	8,027		1.3%
1940	7,613		−5.2%
1950	8,071		6.0%
1960	8,884		10.1%
1970	11,957		34.6%
1980	12,774		6.8%
1990	14,363		12.4%
2000	14,619		1.8%
2010	15,405		5.4%
2020	14,973		−2.8%
U.S. Decennial Census

As of the census of 2000, there were 14,619 people, 5,444 households, and 3,908 families residing in the town. The population density was 345.9 inhabitants per square mile (133.6/km^{2}). There were 5,676 housing units at an average density of 134.3 per square mile (51.9/km^{2}). The racial makeup of the town was 96.15% White, 0.78% African American, 0.53% Native American, 0.60% Asian, 0.03% Pacific Islander, 0.63% from other races, and 1.29% from two or more races. Hispanic or Latino of any race were 2.63% of the population.

There were 5,444 households, out of which 36.6% had children under the age of 18 living with them, 53.6% were married couples living together, 13.1% had a female householder with no husband present, and 28.2% were non-families. 21.4% of all households were made up of individuals, and 8.6% had someone living alone who was 65 years of age or older. The average household size was 2.65 and the average family size was 3.06.

In the town, the population was spread out, with 26.9% under the age of 18, 8.0% from 18 to 24, 32.1% from 25 to 44, 21.6% from 45 to 64, and 11.5% who were 65 years of age or older. The median age was 35 years. For every 100 females, there were 95.8 males. For every 100 females age 18 and over, there were 92.1 males.

The median income for a household in the town was $42,851, and the median income for a family was $47,447. Males had a median income of $36,785 versus $24,026 for females. The per capita income for the town was $18,706. About 5.4% of families and 7.0% of the population were below the poverty line, including 8.2% of those under age 18 and 5.6% of those age 65 or over.

== Education ==
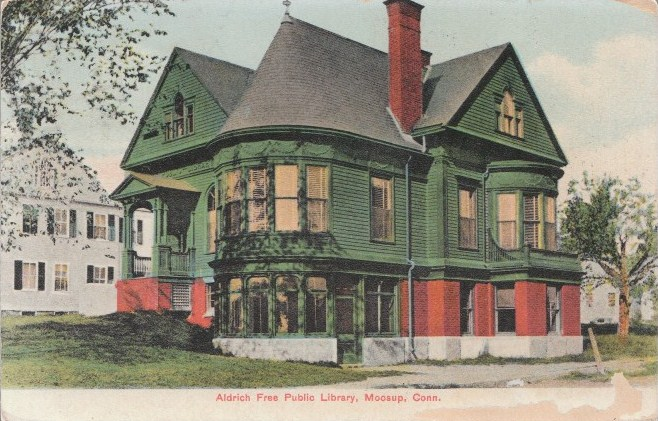
Moosup Free Public Library, c. 1908

The Plainfield Board of Education (also Plainfield Public Schools) is responsible for the operation of schools, and operates five facilities throughout the town.

=== Elementary (K–5) ===
- Moosup Elementary School (K–3)
- Plainfield Memorial School (4–5)
- Shepard Hill Elementary School (PreK–3)

=== Middle/Jr. High (6–8) ===
- Plainfield Central Middle School

=== High (9–12) ===
- Plainfield High School
