= Natchaug =

Natchaug may refer to:

- Natchaug River, in Connecticut
- Natchaug State Forest, in Connecticut
- Natchaug Trail, in Connecticut
- Natchaug School, in Connecticut
- USS Natchaug, a gasoline tanker in service with the United States Navy and Greek Navy
