= Northeastern Connecticut Planning Region, Connecticut =

Northeastern Connecticut Council of Governments (NECCOG)
- Planning region
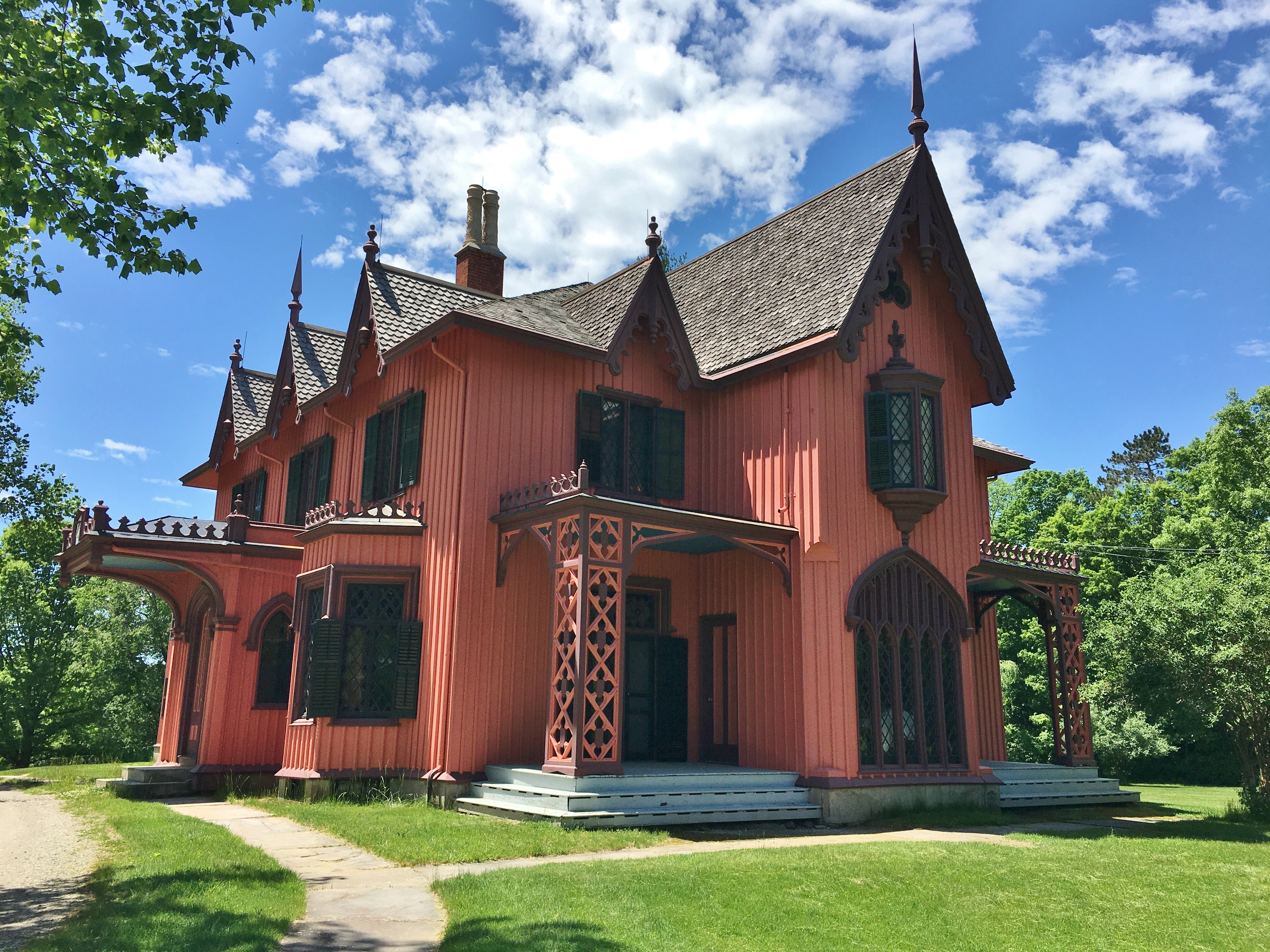
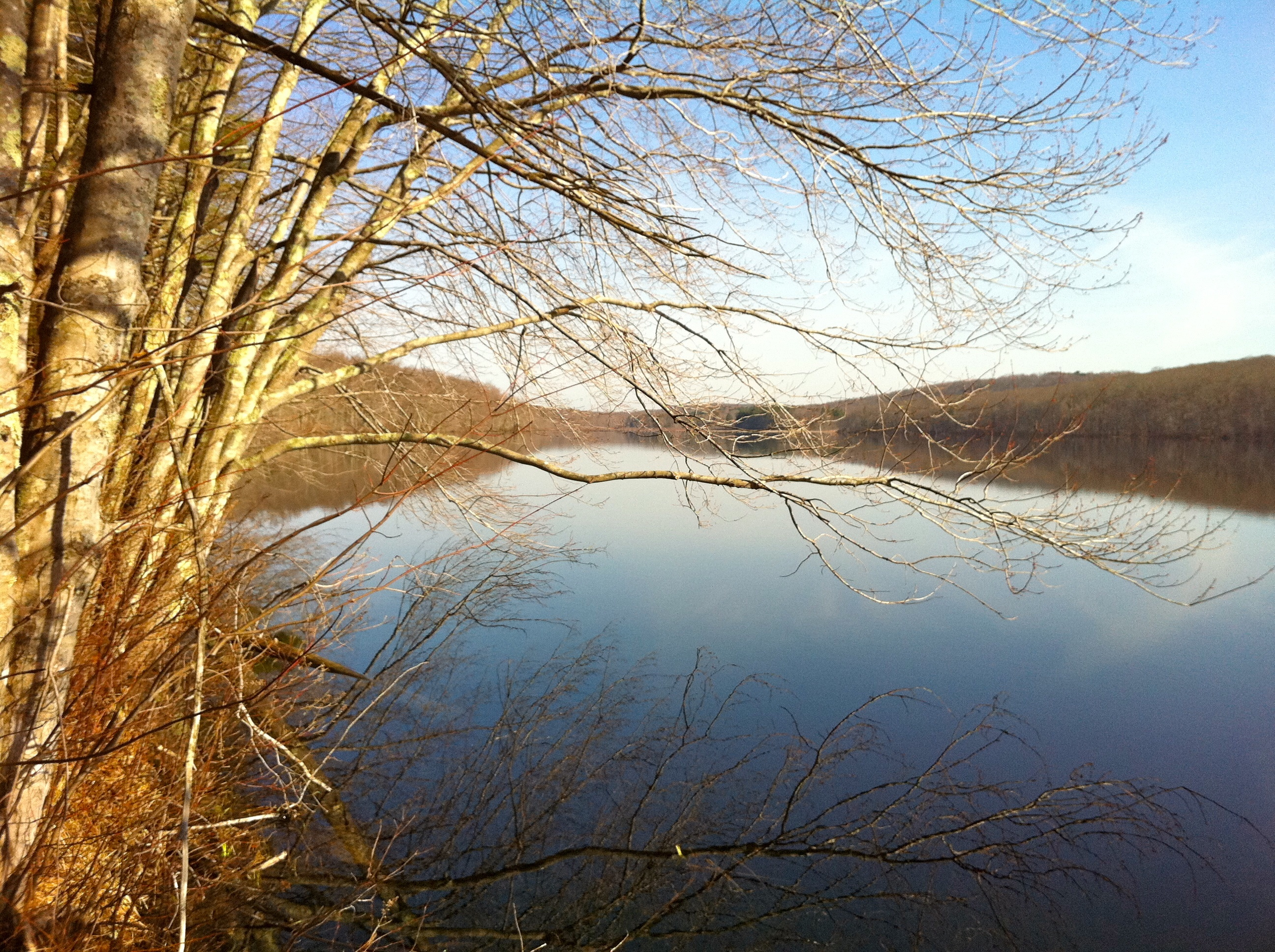
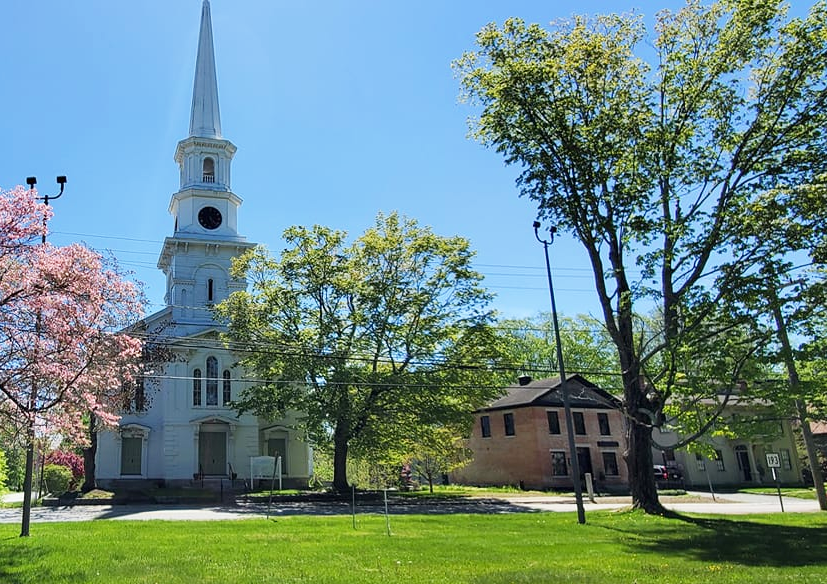
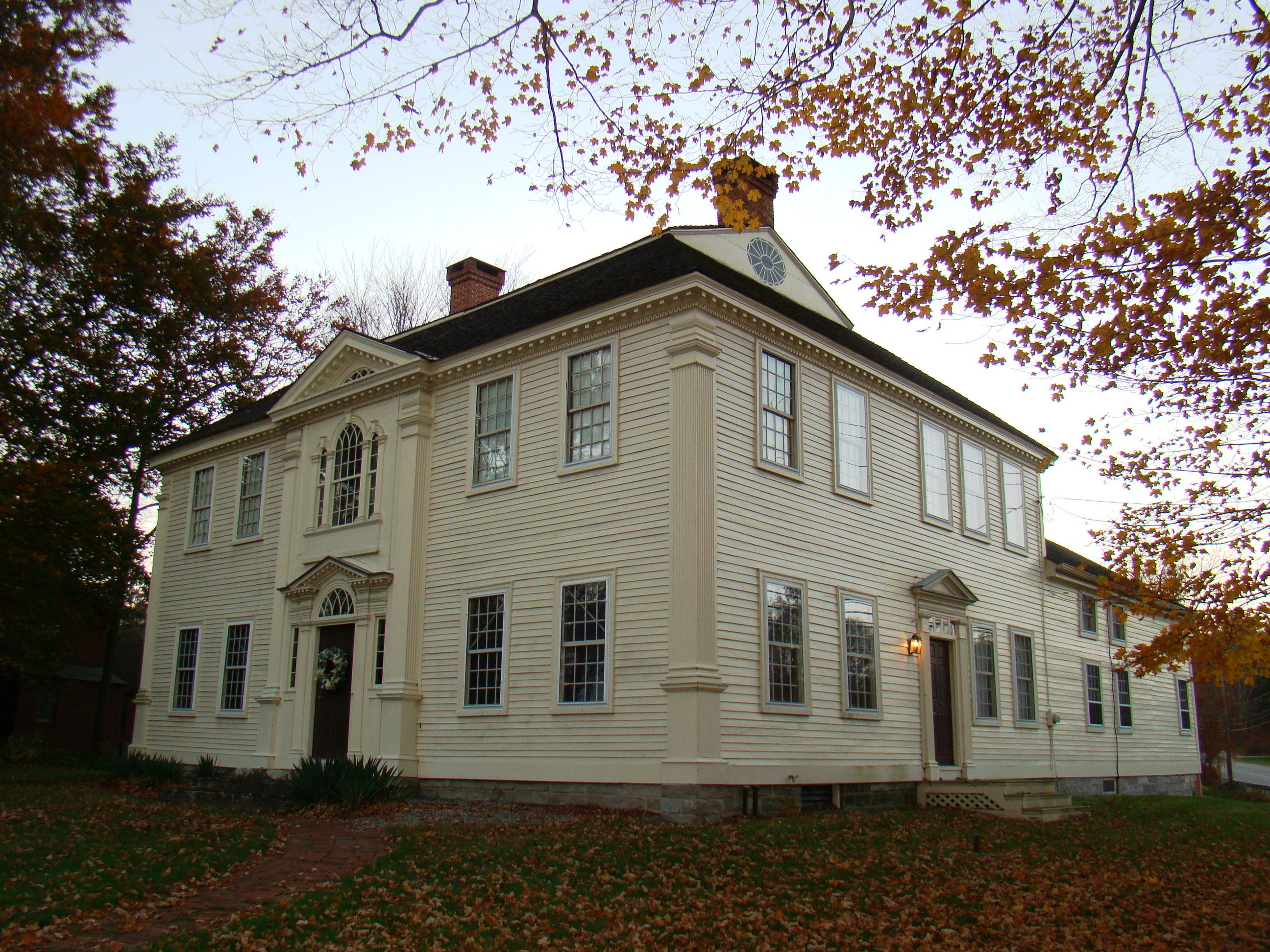
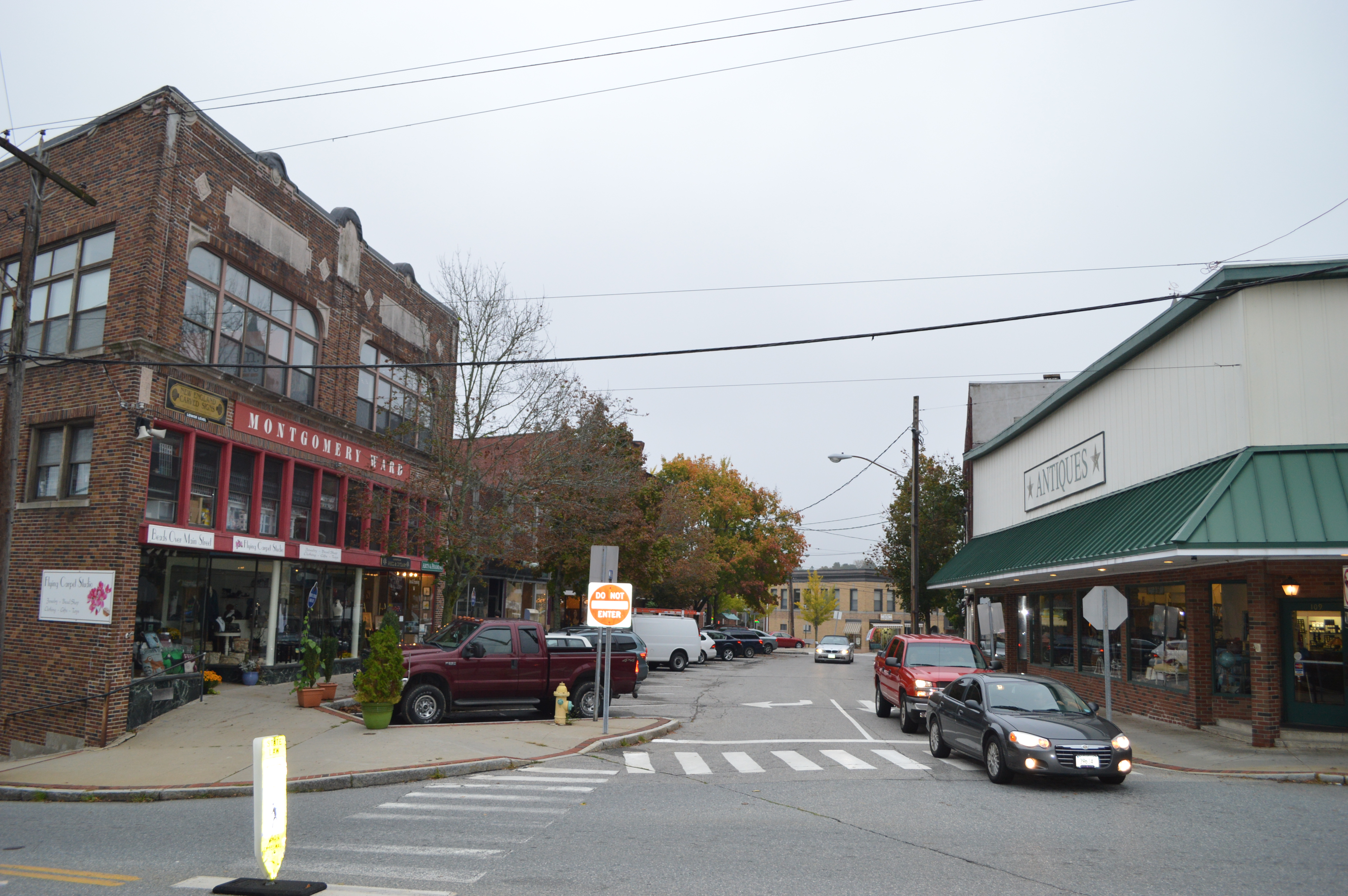
- From top left: Roseland Cottage in Woodstock, Pine Acres Lake along the Natchaug Trail, Thompson Common, Prudence Crandall Museum in Canterbury, Putnam District (village)

- Logo

- Location within the U.S. state of Connecticut
- Coordinates: 41°47′N 71°56′W
- Country: United States
- State: Connecticut
- Founded: 2013
- Largest town: Killingly

Government
  - Executive director: John Filchak

Area
  - Total: 553.9 sq mi (1,435 km^{2})

Population (2020)
  - Total: 95,348
  - Estimate (2025): 98,096 ▲
  - Density: 172.1/sq mi (66.46/km^{2})
- Time zone: UTC−5 (Eastern)
  - Summer (DST): UTC−4 (EDT)
- Congressional district: 2nd
- Website: neccog.org

Interactive map of the Northeastern Connecticut Planning Region

The Northeastern Connecticut Planning Region is a planning region and county-equivalent in the U.S. state of Connecticut. It is served by the coterminous Northeastern Connecticut Council of Governments (NECCOG). In 2022, planning regions were approved to replace Connecticut's counties as county-equivalents for statistical purposes, with full implementation occurring by 2024.

== Demographics ==
Historical population
Census	Pop.	Note	%±
1790	631		—
1800	767		21.6%
1810	752		−2.0%
1820	20,511		2,627.5%
1830	23,738		15.7%
1840	24,293		2.3%
1850	27,263		12.2%
1860	30,768		12.9%
1870	33,733		9.6%
1880	36,131		7.1%
1890	36,617		1.3%
1900	38,024		3.8%
1910	36,858		−3.1%
1920	39,937		8.4%
1930	41,160		3.1%
1940	43,356		5.3%
1950	46,961		8.3%
1960	53,010		12.9%
1970	66,784		26.0%
1980	73,433		10.0%
1990	83,211		13.3%
2000	89,455		7.5%
2010	96,617		8.0%
2020	95,348		−1.3%
2025 (est.)	98,096	▲	2.9%
U.S. Decennial Census

As of the 2020 United States census, there were 95,348 people living in the Northeastern Connecticut Planning Region.

== Municipalities ==
The following municipalities are members of the Northeastern Connecticut Planning Region:

=== Towns ===
- Ashford
- Brooklyn
- Canterbury
- Chaplin
- Eastford
- Hampton
- Killingly
- Plainfield
- Pomfret
- Putnam
- Scotland
- Sterling
- Thompson
- Union
- Voluntown
- Woodstock
