= Sumner-Carpenter House =

Historic house in Connecticut, United States

- U.S. National Register of Historic Places
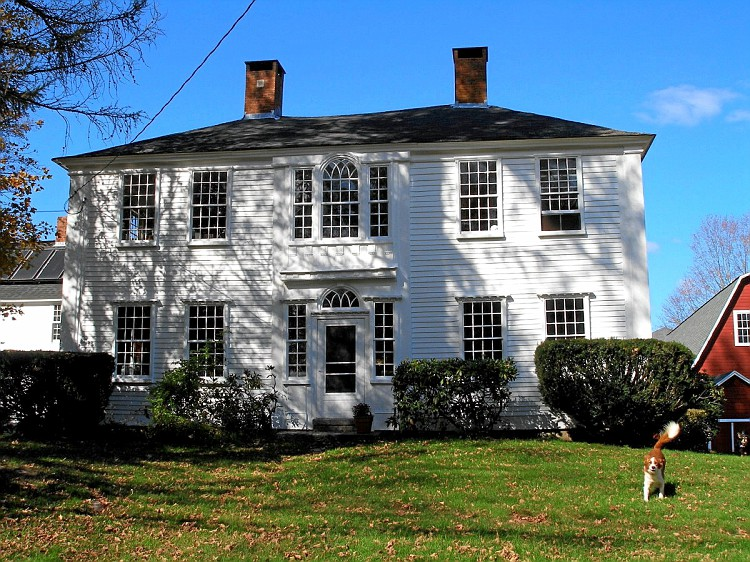

- Location within Connecticut Location within the United States
- Location: 333 Old Colony Road, Eastford, Connecticut
- Coordinates: 41°54′11″N 72°4′1″W
- Area: 27 acres (11 ha)
- Built: 1806
- Architect: Goodell, Vini
- Architectural style: Federal
- NRHP reference No.: 91001854
- Added to NRHP: December 26, 1991

The Sumner-Carpenter House is a historic house at 333 Old Colony Road in Eastford, Connecticut. Built about 1806, it is a well-preserved local example of a rural Federal period residence, augmented by a modest collection of Colonial Revival outbuildings. It was listed on the National Register of Historic Places in 1991.

== Description and history ==
The Sumner-Carpenter House is located in a rural area east of Eastford center, on the north side of Old Colony Road just west of its crossing of Bungee Brook. It is a 2 1/2-story wood-frame structure, consisting of a main block and a series of additions. The main block has a hipped roof, with a side gable-roofed ell, apparently built either with or not long after the main block, with a gable roof, and a c. 1900 two story gable-roofed wing to the rear. The main facade is five bays wide, with a center entrance flanked by wide sidelights, and topped by a rounded transom and corniced entablature. The window above the entrance is in the Palladian style, with a rounded center window flanked by narrower sashes. The interior retains a number of original features, as well as sensitive reproductions of parts that were seriously deteriorated.

The house was built c. 1806, probably by Vini Goodell who also built the Benjamin Bosworth House, for John Newton Sumner. It is a well-preserved local example of a rural Federal period residence, augmented by a modest collection of Colonial Revival outbuildings. The property was the centerpiece of a typically larger farm property that was one of the town's most successful. One late 19th-century owner, David Carpenter, was active in civic affairs, serving as town selectman and in the state legislature. The house underwent a historically sensitive restoration in the 1970s.

== See also ==
- National Register of Historic Places listings in Windham County, Connecticut
