= Natchaug Forest Lumber Shed =

- U.S. National Register of Historic Places
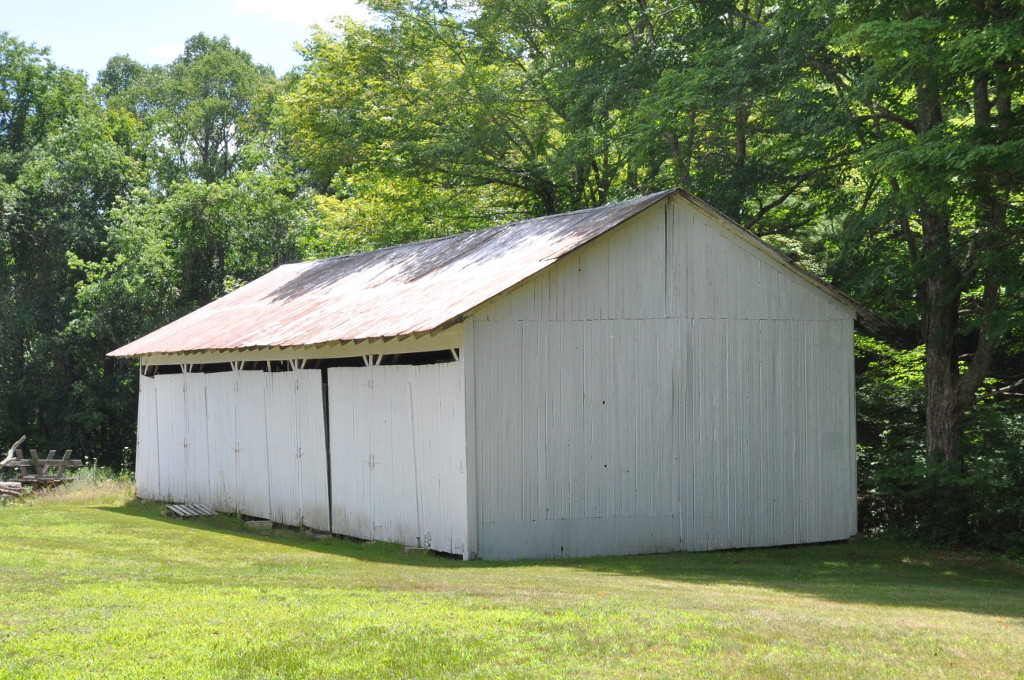

- Location within Connecticut Location within the United States
- Location: Kingsbury Road, Natchaug State Forest, Eastford, Connecticut
- Coordinates: 41°50′21″N 72°5′4″W
- Area: 0.7 acres (0.28 ha)
- Built: 1934
- Architect: Civilian Conservation Corps
- MPS: Connecticut State Park and Forest Depression-Era Federal Work Relief Programs Structures TR
- NRHP reference No.: 86001732
- Added to NRHP: September 04, 1986

The Natchaug Forest Lumber Shed is a historic utility building in Natchaug State Forest in Eastford, Connecticut, United States. It was built in the 1930s, and is one of the only surviving buildings (of a large number) built by the Civilian Conservation Corps in the forest. It was listed on the National Register of Historic Places in 1986.

== Description and history ==
The Natchaug Forest Lumber Shed is located in the maintenance yard of Natchaug State Forest, on Kingsbury Road near the geographic center of the forest. The yard is the former site of the CCC camp which operated in the forest in the 1930s and early 1940s. The shed is located at the southern end of the yard, on the east side of the road. It is a vernacular post-and-beam structure with vertical board siding. Its north-facing front has five equipment bays with double-leaf wooden doors.

Natchaug State Forest was established in 1919, and was over 12,000 acres (49 km^{2}) in size by the 1930s. Its facilities (roads, trails, and other infrastructure) were developed by a crew of the Civilian Conservation Corps which was based in the forest between 1933 and 1941. Buildings that crew is known to have built include a workshop, garage, oil house, barn, sawdust shed, and three lumber sheds. When this building was listed on the National Register, it was reported that three buildings survived, of which two had been extensively altered. This shed is the best-preserved of the three.

== See also ==
- National Register of Historic Places listings in Windham County, Connecticut
