= Natchaug School =

Natchaug Elementary School
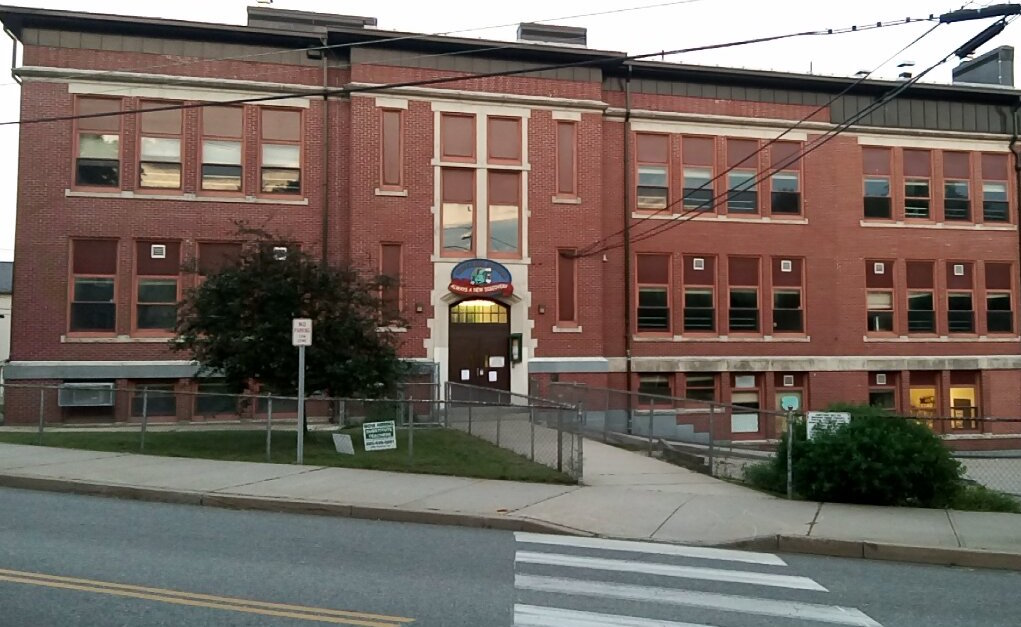
- Front entrance of the school

Location
- 123 Jackson Street; Willimantic, (Windham County), Connecticut 06226; United States; 41.713685°N 72.20667°W

Information
- Type: Public school
- Motto: "Always a New Discovery"
- Established: March, 1865
- School district: Windham School District
- Grades: K-5
- Enrollment: 278 (2021)
- Colors: Blue and Green
- Website: Natchaug School Homepage

Natchaug Elementary School is a public elementary school in Willimantic, Connecticut, United States. The school opened in 1865 at the junction of Milk Street and Jackson Street, in downtown Willimantic. It is part of the Windham Public School system and one of four elementary schools and a K-8 STEM magnet school. Natchaug is accredited by the New England Association of Schools and Colleges. The name Natchaug comes from the Nipmuc word meaning "land between the rivers." The school colors are bright green and blue.

Natchaug is a public school open to students from kindergarten through fifth grade, after which they move on to Windham Middle School. In the 2021–22 school year there were 278 enrolled students in grades K-5. With 26 classroom teachers, the school has a student-teacher ratio of about 11:1. Natchaug also has a Family Resource Center and before- and after-school programs for its students. Natchaug is a neighborhood school; most students walk to school, although a few school buses are provided.

== Academics and activities ==
Natchaug has offered bilingual education for Spanish-speakers for forty years, since the 1980s, in accordance with state legislation. Currently about half of Natchaug students are considered English Language Learners, in comparison to 9% of all public school students statewide. In the Windham School District overall, 31% of students are English Learners. The school district started dual-language programs in 2018–19, with the aim of promoting bilingualism among primarily Spanish-speaking children and primarily English-speaking children.

School assessments show lagging statewide test performance at Natchaug, compared to the overall performance of Connecticut elementary school students. However, such assessments may not accurately reflect the quality of education, because schools that have economically disadvantaged students, and many students learning English, tend to have lower scores on general assessments.

Natchaug has held an annual Field Day (día de campo) at the end of each school year for many decades. A more recent annual event, hosted by the Parent-Teacher Organization, is a family carnival with free games, face painting, a free bike raffle, and other activities, including a "Pie the Teacher" booth. Natchaug also celebrates Hispanic Heritage Month.

== Student and staff demographics ==
Natchaug's students numbered 278 in the 2021–22 school year, with about 40 per grade in K-3 and about 55 each in fourth and fifth. There were more boys than girls enrolled (53 to 47%). Most children are from Hispanic backgrounds (about three-fourths), while one-sixth are non-Hispanic white and smaller numbers are Asian, Black, American Indian, multiracial or of other backgrounds. Among educators at the school, most (81%) are non-Hispanic white, 16% Hispanic, and a small number of other ancestry.

Like students in the Windham area as a whole, many students live in household with low income, reflected in the fact that most (three in four) qualify for free or reduced-price lunch, where eligibility is based on their family's income. For comparison, the Connecticut public school average is 43% of students being enrolled in the lunch program.

== History ==
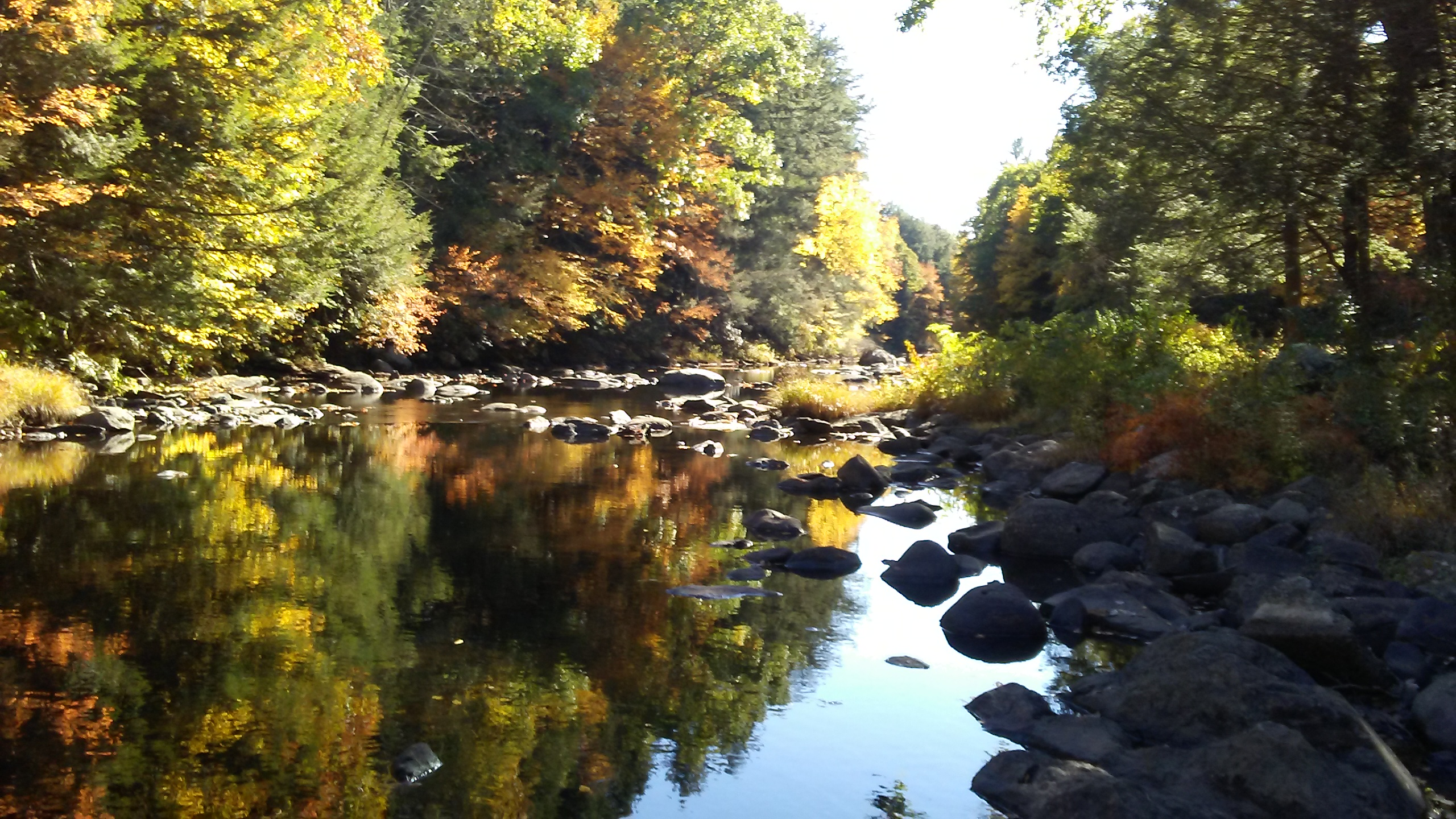
Natchaug River, view southward in Eastford, Connecticut

The city of Willimantic lies in an area that historically was home to several Native American groups, including the Nipmuc people, from whose language the name derives. 'Natchaug' is a geographical term for land between rivers, perhaps the Natchaug and the Willimantic. The name is shared with Natchaug State Forest, the Natchaug Trail, and a nearby hospital.

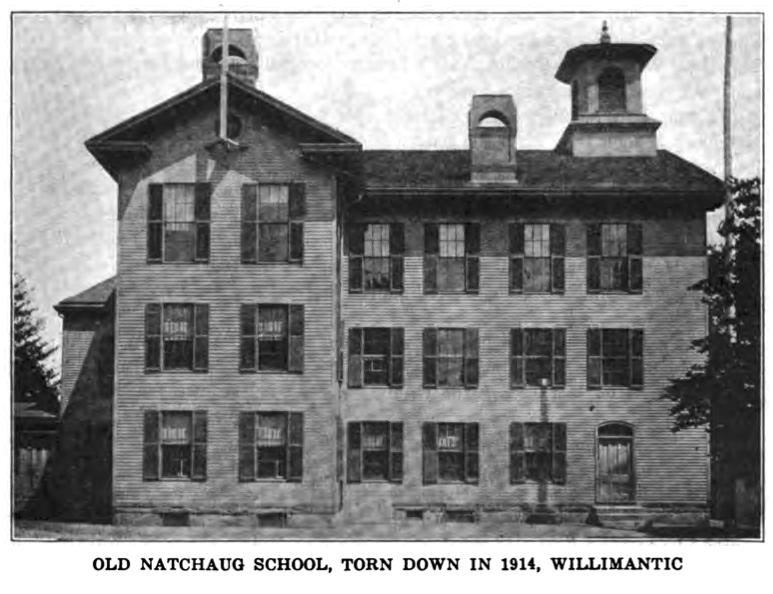
Old Natchaug School, c. 1910

Natchaug School was originally for students from elementary through high school. The school was initially a large three-story wooden building, completed in 1864 to replace the old stone schoolhouse that had served the students on the east side of Willimantic since 1831. The school was described admiringly in an 1889 history of Windham:

It was built in 1864, – and it has a seating capacity of about six hundred, with an average attendance of about five hundred. The building is in excellent repair and is in an ample yard, ornamented with shade trees. The furniture of the school buildings is nearly all modern and of an excellent model. ... The school libraries contain 1,000 or more volumes. Globes, maps and books are there in commendable numbers for the use of the primary and grammar grades.

The Qing dynasty sent several pupils from China to study at Natchaug in the late 1870s, as part of the educational mission of the dynasty's Self-Strengthening Movement. Visiting students included Chang Yau Kung, Won Bing Chung, and Sung Mun Wai.

Natchaug High School was a part of the school until 1897, when ninth through twelfth grade moved to a separate building known as Windham High School. In 1914, the original wooden school was torn down to make way for the current brick structure.

== Current events ==
Willimantic children have been educated at Natchaug almost continuously since 1865. The exception is an eighteen-month period when the school was closed due to roof damage in 2012–2014. During that period, students attended elementary school classes at Windham Middle School.

=== COVID-19 ===
At the height of the COVID-19 pandemic, classes in all Connecticut public schools, including Natchaug, were taught remotely. In response to the pandemic's impact on children's emotional well-being, Natchaug's teachers used a puppet-based model for helping students learn to recognize and manage feelings. The program is based on cognitive behavioral therapy principles. Natchaug staff have worked with the University of Connecticut's school of puppetry to develop lessons in short puppeteered films, and students received kits to make their own puppets.

=== Climate change impacts ===
Like many Connecticut schools, and especially schools located in poorer school districts, Natchaug lacks sufficient air conditioning for keeping the building at safe temperatures during heat waves, which are increasing in frequency due to global warming. In September 2023, a heat wave caused Natchaug and other schools across the state to close due to unsafe temperatures in the facilities. Earlier in 2023, due to the wildfires in Canada, poor air quality caused Natchaug to have to reschedule its annual Field Day.

=== Principals ===
- Jeannine Enamait (interim 2023)
- Eben Jones (2017–2023)
- Robert Kallajian (2016–2017)
- Melissa Mishriky Cyr (2015–2016)
- Jeff Wihbey (2010–2012)
- Joseph Janisaitis (2008–2010)
- Rose Bisson (2004–2008)
- Penny Hebert (interim)
- Maureen Bojka (2003–2004, interim)
- Kathleen Rosewall (2002–2003)
- Collette Trailor (c. 1999–2002)
- Susan Webb (1990s)

In earlier decades, principals included:

- Robert Perry (1950s)
- James L. Harroun (1892-c.1927)
- George Cadwell (1888–1892)
- William Burdick (1884–1888)
- Col. John B. Welch (1872–1884)
- Thomas H. Fuller (1868–1872)
- David P. Corbin (1866–1868)
- S. W. Powell (1865–1866)

== Notable alumni ==
- Wilbur Cross, literary critic and 71st governor of Connecticut
- William Sprague, Congregationalist clergyman
- Isaiah Oggins, American-born spy for the Soviet Union
- Sung Mun Wai (宋文翙), participant in the 1870s Chinese Educational Mission and Vice Admiral in the Chinese Navy
- George Ernest Waldo, U.S. Representative from New York (1905–09)
