= Witter House =

Historic house in Connecticut, United States

- U.S. National Register of Historic Places
- U.S. Historic district – Contributing property
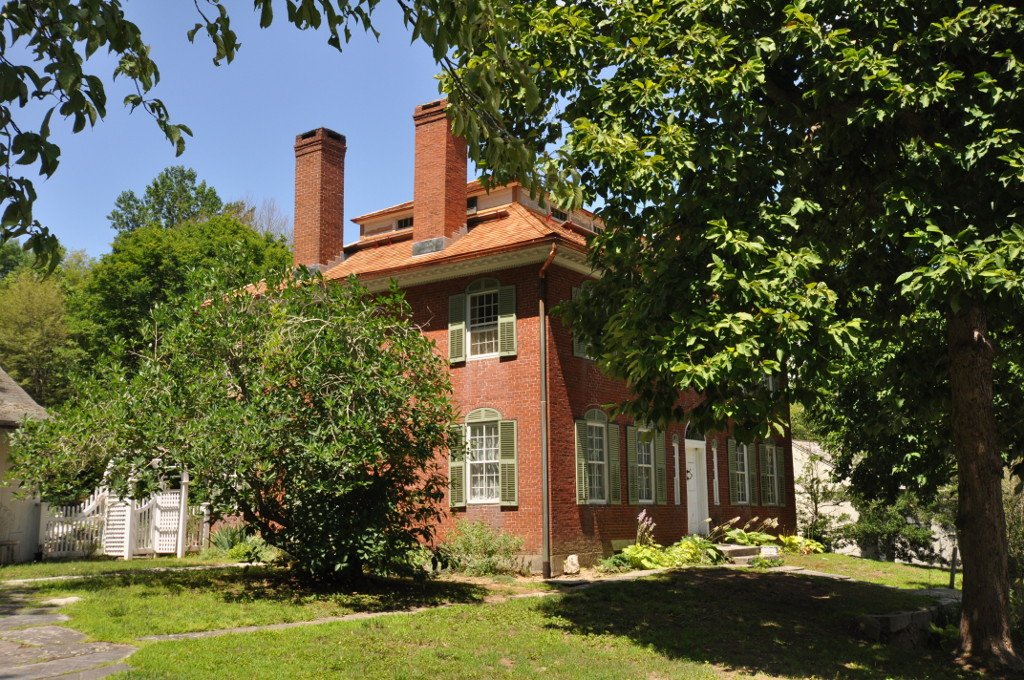

- Location within Connecticut Location within the United States
- Location: Chaplin Street, Chaplin, Connecticut
- Coordinates: 41°47′47″N 72°7′46″W
- Area: 1 acre (0.40 ha)
- Built: 1820
- Architectural style: Georgian
- Part of: Chaplin Historic District (ID78002856)
- NRHP reference No.: 70000704

Significant dates
- Added to NRHP: October 06, 1970
- Designated CP: October 11, 1978

The Witter House is a historic house on Chaplin Street in Chaplin, Connecticut. Built in 1820–21, it is a high-quality and little-altered example of Federal period architecture executed in brick. It was home to the town's first town clerk, remaining in the Witter family until 1960. It was listed on the National Register of Historic Places in 1970.

== Description and history ==
The Witter House is located in the roughly linear village of Chaplin, on the west side of Chaplin Street a short way south of its junction with Tower Hill Road. The 2 1/2-story brick structure is a late example of Georgian architecture. It is five bays wide, with paired chimneys at the ends of the hip roof. The centered entrance is flanked by arched sidelight windows and has a fanlight above. The fanlight detail is echoed by semi-elliptical fan louvers above each window. The roof has a monitor section at its center, an unusual feature not normally found in New England houses of the period. The interior retains many period features, including wide floorboards. There are seven fireplaces in the house, each with distinctively carved mantels. The two front parlors each feature a free-standing carved column.

The house was built in 1820-21 and owned by three generations of medical doctors all named Oren Witter. It was sold out of the family in 1960 to another medical doctor, F. Brae Rafferty. The first Oren Witter also served as the first town clerk for Chaplin, after it was incorporated in 1822.

== See also ==
- National Register of Historic Places listings in Windham County, Connecticut
