= Natchaug State Forest =

Forest in Connecticut, United States

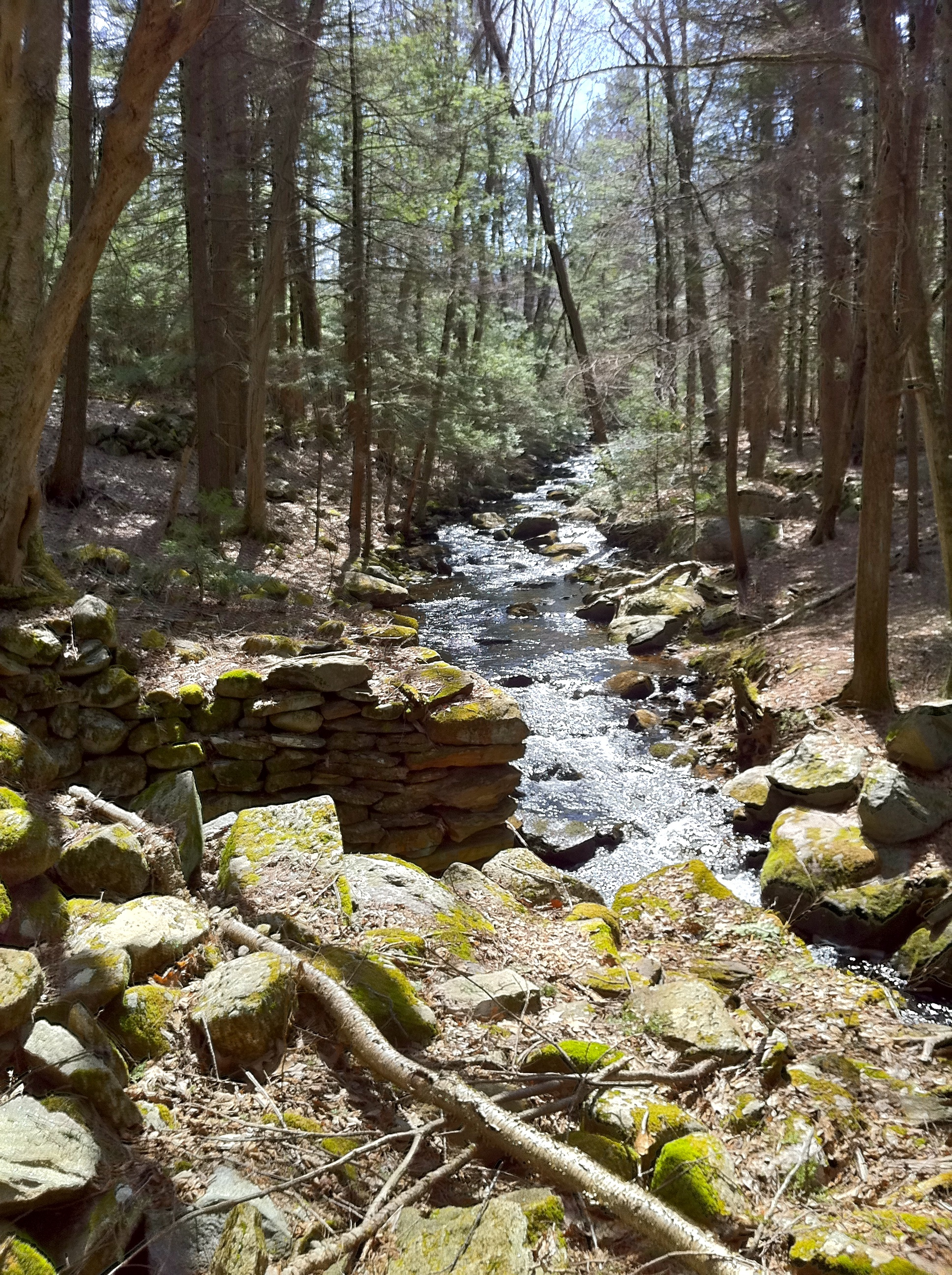

- Location within Connecticut Location within the United States
- Location: Ashford, Brooklyn, Chaplin, Eastford, Hampton, and Pomfret, Connecticut, United States
- Coordinates: 41°49′33″N 72°03′32″W
- Area: 13,438 acres (5,438 ha)
- Elevation: 591 ft (180 m)
- Established: 1917
- Administrator: Connecticut Department of Energy and Environmental Protection
- Website: Official website

Natchaug State Forest is a Connecticut state forest located in six towns including Ashford, Chaplin, and Eastford. The Natchaug River runs from north to south along (and in a few cases through) the western border of the main forest parcel. James L. Goodwin State Forest abuts Natchaug State Forest to the south. One of the forest units abuts Mashamoquet Brook State Park in Pomfret. The forest lies within the Last Green Valley National Heritage Corridor and Northeastern coastal forests ecoregion.

== Recreation ==
The forest's extensive trail system includes the Natchaug Trail and CCC Loop. Trails are used for hiking, horseback riding, mountain biking, cross-country skiing, and snowmobiling. Camping facilities are available for backpackers and equestrians. The forest is also the site of a small state park encompassing the birthplace of American Civil War brigadier general Nathaniel Lyon.
