= Union Society of Phoenixville House =

- U.S. National Register of Historic Places
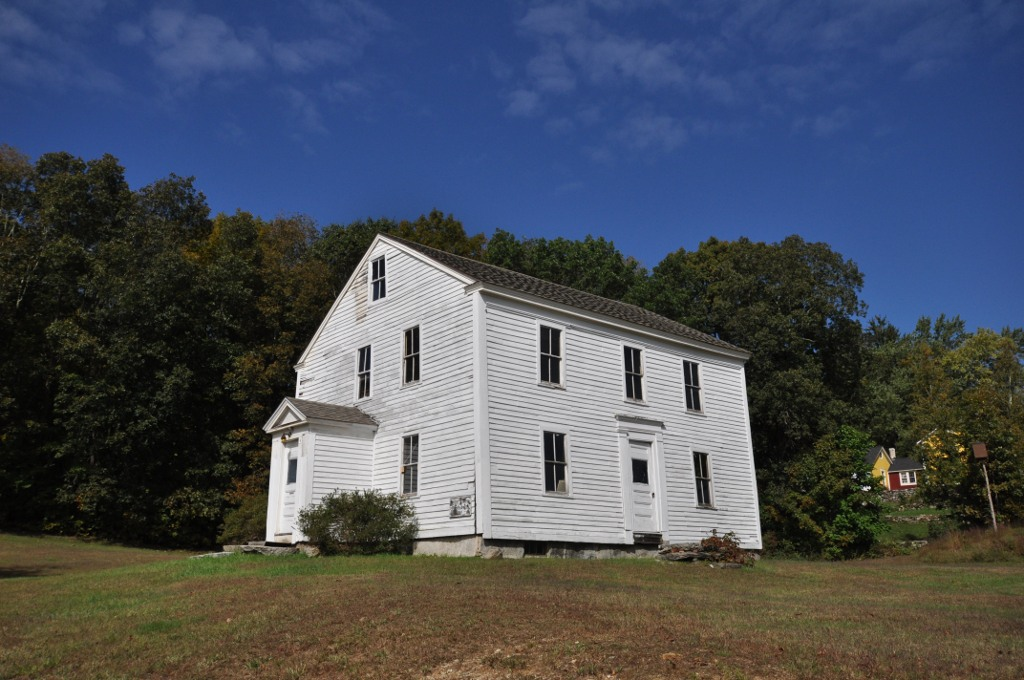

- Location within Connecticut Location within the United States
- Location: 4 Hartford Turnpike, Eastford, Connecticut
- Coordinates: 41°52′37″N 72°5′12″W
- Area: 1.2 acres (0.49 ha)
- Built: 1806
- Architectural style: Greek Revival
- NRHP reference No.: 07001247
- Added to NRHP: December 11, 2007

The Union Society of Phoenixville House (or Community House) is a historic community building at 4 Hartford Turnpike in Eastford, Connecticut.

The village of Phoenixville is within the town of Eastford, and the Union Society of Phoenixville House is located at the junction of State Highway 198 and U.S. Route 44. It is a rectangular wood-frame structure, three bays wide, with a side gable roof and a granite foundation. It has two entrances, one in the center bay of the east-facing facade, and another in the south facade, in a projecting gabled vestibule. It was built in 1806, but spent many years as a Sunday School and social meeting space. It was added to the National Register of Historic Places in 2007.

Mill owner Smith Snow built the house as a wedding gift for his wife. In the mid-1800s, a national Union Society movement swept the United States as an effort to teach children to read during Sunday School. At that time, many children worked 6 and 7 days a week and received no education. They were considered "lost souls." The Union Society of Phoenixville gathered on Sundays at various homes. The Union Society of Phoenixville House was one of the homes that welcomed everyone who wished to participate, regardless of age, gender, social status, spiritual beliefs, or ethnic origin. The formal Union Society of Phoenixville incorporated in 1906 with the mission of providing morally uplifting activities for children and families. In addition to the weekly Sunday School, many village gatherings happened in this building. These included pot luck suppers, wild game suppers, card games such as dominoes and whist, fundraising oyster suppers for the volunteer fire company, and holiday parties celebrating Easter, July 4, Halloween and Christmas. In 1918, 87 children received gifts at Christmas from the Union Society. The traditional gifts were an orange and a box of hard candy, but needy children often received a small piece of jewelry, a game or puzzle. Youngsters played croquet in a section of the yard surrounded by the foundation walls of a former barn. Starting in the late 1920s, the croquet court was lighted at night by electricity generated by a nearby mill that waw owned by John Smith, who, with wife Edith Wheaton Smith, lived in an adjacent house. Through the 1950s, children played croquet on the croquet court. When the Sunday School children reached the age of 12, they were urged to memorize the 10 Commandments, and when they could recite these Biblical laws, each child received a King James Bible. One of these Bibles has been donated by Mary Jezierski, who received her Bible in 1937. Mary was a resident of the adjacent town of Ashford, and was one of several children who were transported to the building for Sunday School. All were welcome. Activities continued at the property until the year 2000. In 2002, due to dwindling membership and maintenance challenges, the building was sold to the Town of Eastford. Currently it is undergoing renovations with the objective of reopening it for public use. The building is listed on the State and National Registers of Historic Places due to its contributions to the cultural heritage of the region. It is one of only two Union Society buildings still standing in Connecticut.

== See also ==
- National Register of Historic Places listings in Windham County, Connecticut
