= Natchaug Trail =

Hiking trail

Coordinates: 41.999°N 72.132°W

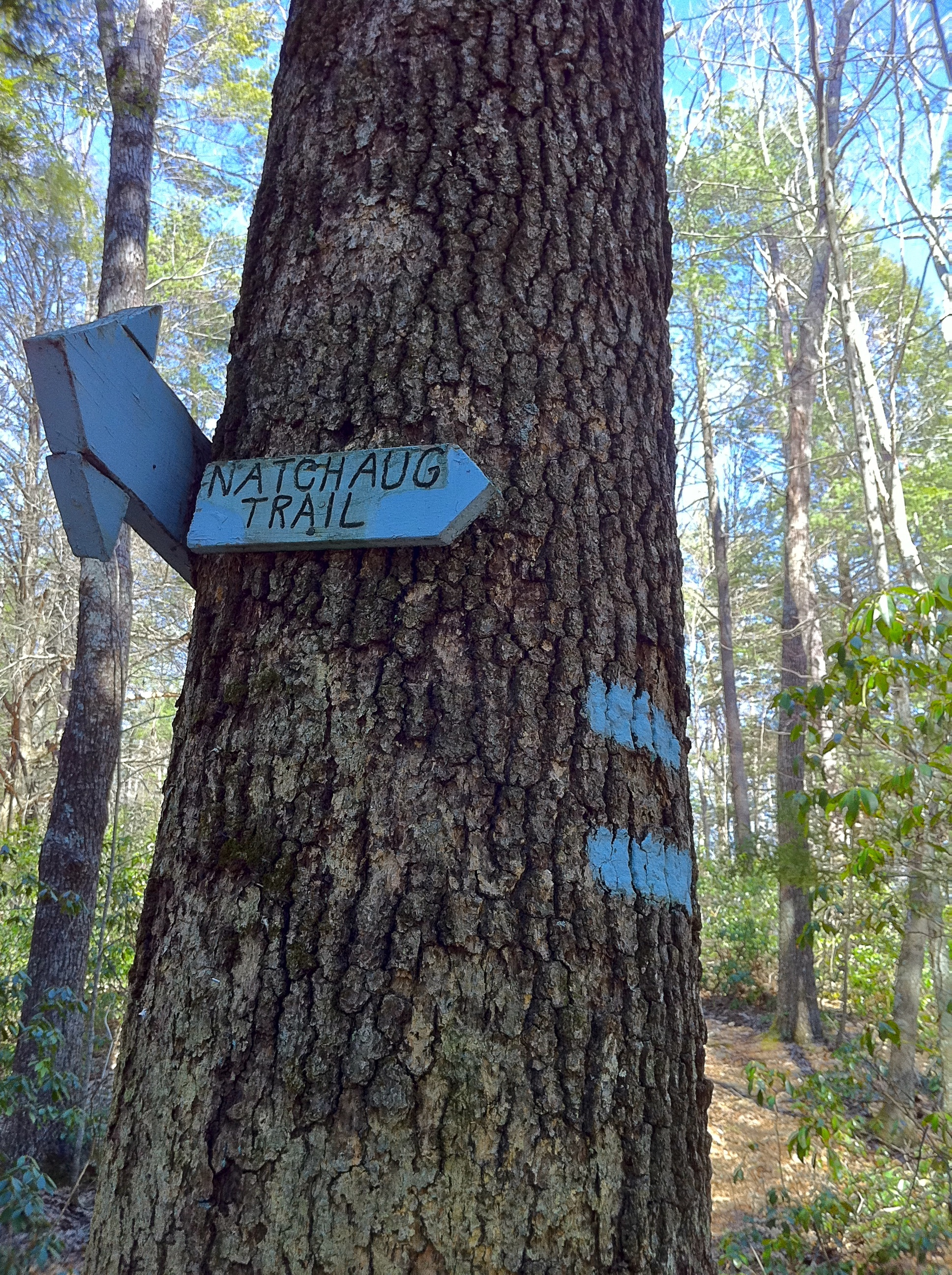
- Natchaug Trail northern trailhead at intersection with Nipmuck Trail in Ashford, CT
- Length: 19.5 miles (31.4 km)
- Location: Windham County, Connecticut, USA
- Designation: CFPA Blue-Blazed Trail
- Use: hiking, cross-country skiing, snowshoeing, fishing, geocaching, other
- Hazards: hunters, deer ticks, poison ivy

The Natchaug Trail is a Blue-Blazed hiking trail "system" which meanders through 19.5 miles (31.4 km) of forests in northeast Connecticut—primarily in Windham County. It is maintained by the Connecticut Forest and Park Association. Its southern trailhead begins in the James L. Goodwin State Forest in the towns of Chaplin, Connecticut and Hampton, Connecticut and the northern terminus is at its intersection with the Nipmuck Trail in Natchaug State Forest in Eastford, Connecticut.

For much of its length the Natchaug Trail travels through two Connecticut state forests—the James L. Goodwin State Forest and Natchaug State Forest as well as the much smaller Nathaniel Lyons Memorial Park. Camping permits may be obtained by backpackers for both state forests.

In addition to the Nipmuck Trail there are several smaller hiking trails which connect to the Natchaug Trail as well as several park and forest roads and the multi-use Airline State Park Linear Trail.

In Natchaug State Forest the CCC Trail is a historic loop trail which was built by the Civilian Conservation Corps during the Great Depression in the 1930s.

Two of the several trails inside the James L. Goodwin State Forest are connected to the Natchaug Trail have recently been blazed as official CFPA trails. According to signs at the James L. Goodwin State Forest the White Trail is being (or has been) re-blazed as a blue-white trail named the "Pine Acres Lake View Trail". A CFPA blue-orange blazed trail also intersects with the Natchaug Trail during the stretch between Pine Acres Lake and Black Spruce Pond.

== Description ==
The Natchaug Trail is primarily used for hiking, backpacking, picnicking, and in the winter, snowshoeing.

Portions of the trail are suitable for, and are used for, cross-country skiing and geocaching. Site-specific activities enjoyed along the route include bird watching, hunting (very limited), fishing, horseback riding, bouldering and rock climbing (limited).

=== Route ===
The northern end of the Natchaug Trail connects with the Nipmuck Trail 1200 feet south of Eastford Road in Ashford, Connecticut in northern Natchaug State Forest. After crossing the unpaved Moon Road, the northern third of the trail generally parallels Bigelow Brook until it merges with the Stones and Stills brooks to become the Natchaug River. For most of the southern two thirds of the trail's length it follows both Connecticut Route 198 and the Natchaug River through the Natchaug and James L. Goodwin State Forests to the southern end at the James L. Goodwin Conservation Center at the southern end of Pine Acres Lake.

=== Trail communities ===
The official Blue-Blazed Natchaug Trail passes through land located within the following municipalities, from south to north:

Hampton, Connecticut, Chaplin, Connecticut, Ashford, Connecticut, Eastford, Connecticut

== History and folklore ==
The Blue-Blazed Natchaug Trail was created by the Connecticut Forest and Park Association. As it did not appear in the 1969 version of the CFPA Connecticut Walk Book and it appears in the 1973 version it would appear to have been created during the 1969-1973 period.

=== Origin and name ===
Natchaug is a Nipmuc Native American word meaning "land between the rivers".

The name Natchaug is used as a geographical place name throughout Eastern Connecticut and particularly in Tolland and Windham counties in Northeastern Connecticut. It was not the name of a native American tribe or group, but of a particular area in Connecticut.

Today the name Natchaug appears as the name of a trail, road, river, elementary school, hospital and state forest.

=== Historic sites ===
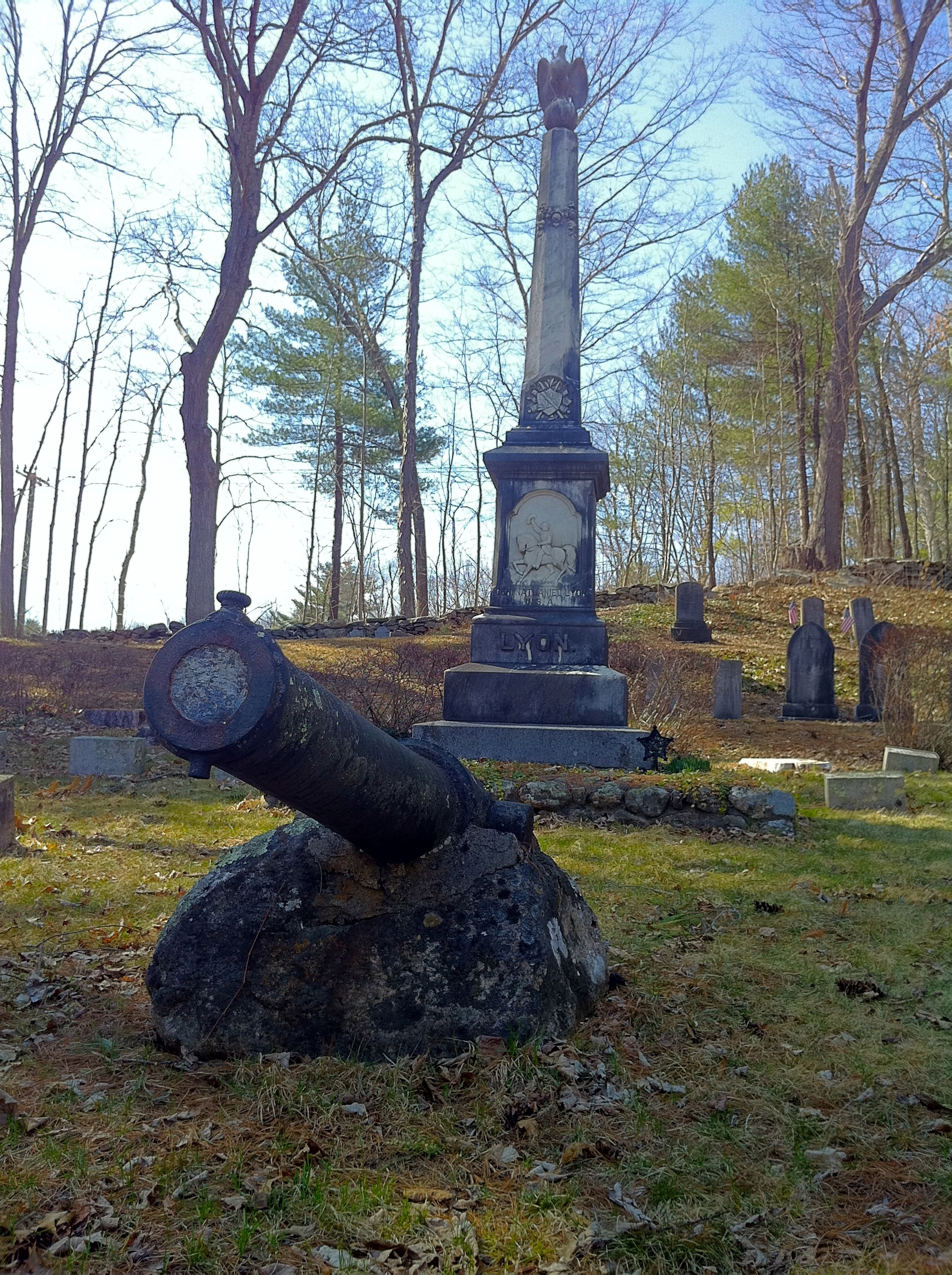
General Nathaniel Lyon gravesite with monument and cannon in Eastford, CT.

The Natchaug state forest occupies a portion of the former hunting grounds of the Wabbaquasset Indians between the Bigelow and Still Rivers.

The James L. Goodwin State Forest is named for, and occupies land donated by its namesake. James L. Goodwin was one of the first Yale University School of Forestry graduates and began using modern forest management practices in the northeastern part of Connecticut. He also created and donated the James L. Goodwin Conservation Center to the state to educate the people of Connecticut regarding "general, wildlife and forest conservation."

There are two memorials to Nathaniel Lyon, the first Union general to die in the US Civil War along the Natchaug Trail.

Nathaniel Lyon Memorial State Park contains the birthplace of General Lyon, although only the very large fireplace remains.

General Nathaniel Lyon Memorial in General Lyon Cemetery (established 1805) is located in the Phoenixville section of Eastford just north of the northern end of a portion of General Lyon Road overlaps with the Natchaug Trail.

=== Folklore ===
There are remains of foundations for stone houses, dams and cisterns along both the Natchaug Trail and CCC side trail.

There are several letterboxes cached along both trails including two official State of Connecticut Department of Environmental Protection (DEP) letterboxes. One is in Natchaug State Forest on the CCC Trail and the other is in the James L. Goodwin State Forest near Pine Acres Lake close by a three-sided cellar hole where the local legend says that the smell of wood smoke can often still be detected on cold January nights from a long gone chimney.

There is a trail register notebook in a can affixed to the northern end of a foot bridge over Stones Brook on the Natchaug Trail approximately 0.6 mile south of Connecticut Route 44.

== Hiking ==
The mainline trail is blazed with blue rectangles. Trail descriptions are available from a number of commercial and non-commercial sources, and a complete guidebook is published by the Connecticut Forest and Park Association

It is regularly maintained, and is considered easy hiking, with very few sections of rugged and moderately difficult hiking.

Much of the trail is close to public roads. There are camping facilities along the trail in the two state forests. Otherwise camping is generally prohibited in the other areas along the trail. There are nearby commercial camping accommodations available on Connecticut Route 198, in particular the Charlie Brown Campground in Eastford and the Nickerson Park Family Campground in Chaplin (visible on the western bank of the Natchaug River from the CCC side trail).

Weather along the route is typical of Connecticut. Conditions on exposed ridge tops and summits may be harsher during cold or stormy weather. Lightning is a hazard on exposed summits and ledges during thunderstorms. Snow is common in the winter and may necessitate the use of snowshoes. Ice can form on exposed ledges and summits, making hiking dangerous without special equipment.

Biting insects can be bothersome during warm weather. Parasitic deer ticks (which are known to carry Lyme disease) are a potential hazard.

Almost all of the trail is adjacent to, or is on lands where hunting and the use of firearms are permitted. Wearing bright orange clothing during the hunting season (Fall through December) is recommended.

== Image gallery ==
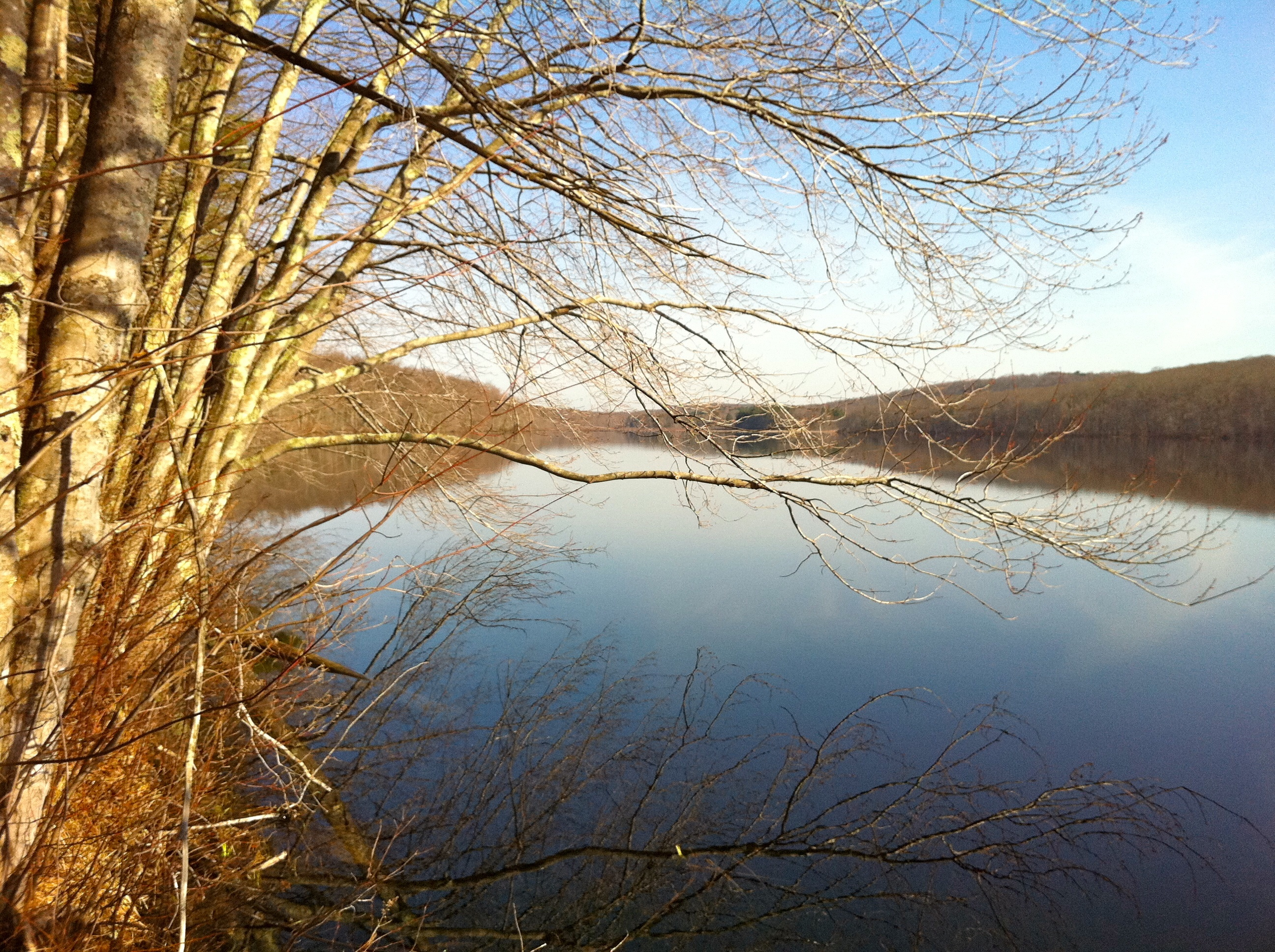
View of Pine Acres Lake looking north from close to the southern start of the Natchaug Trail

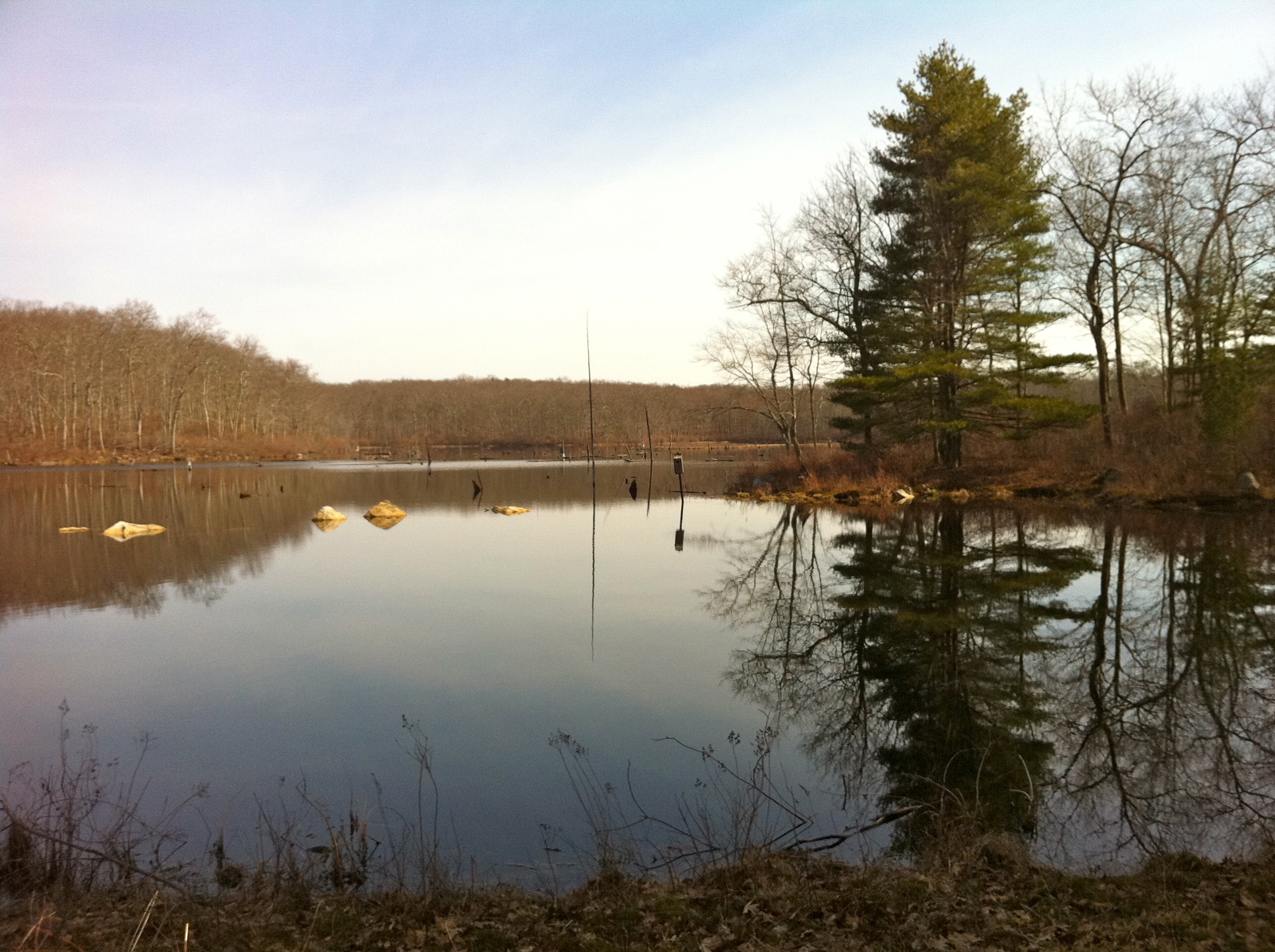
View from the southern end of Black Spruce Pond off the Natchaug Trail.

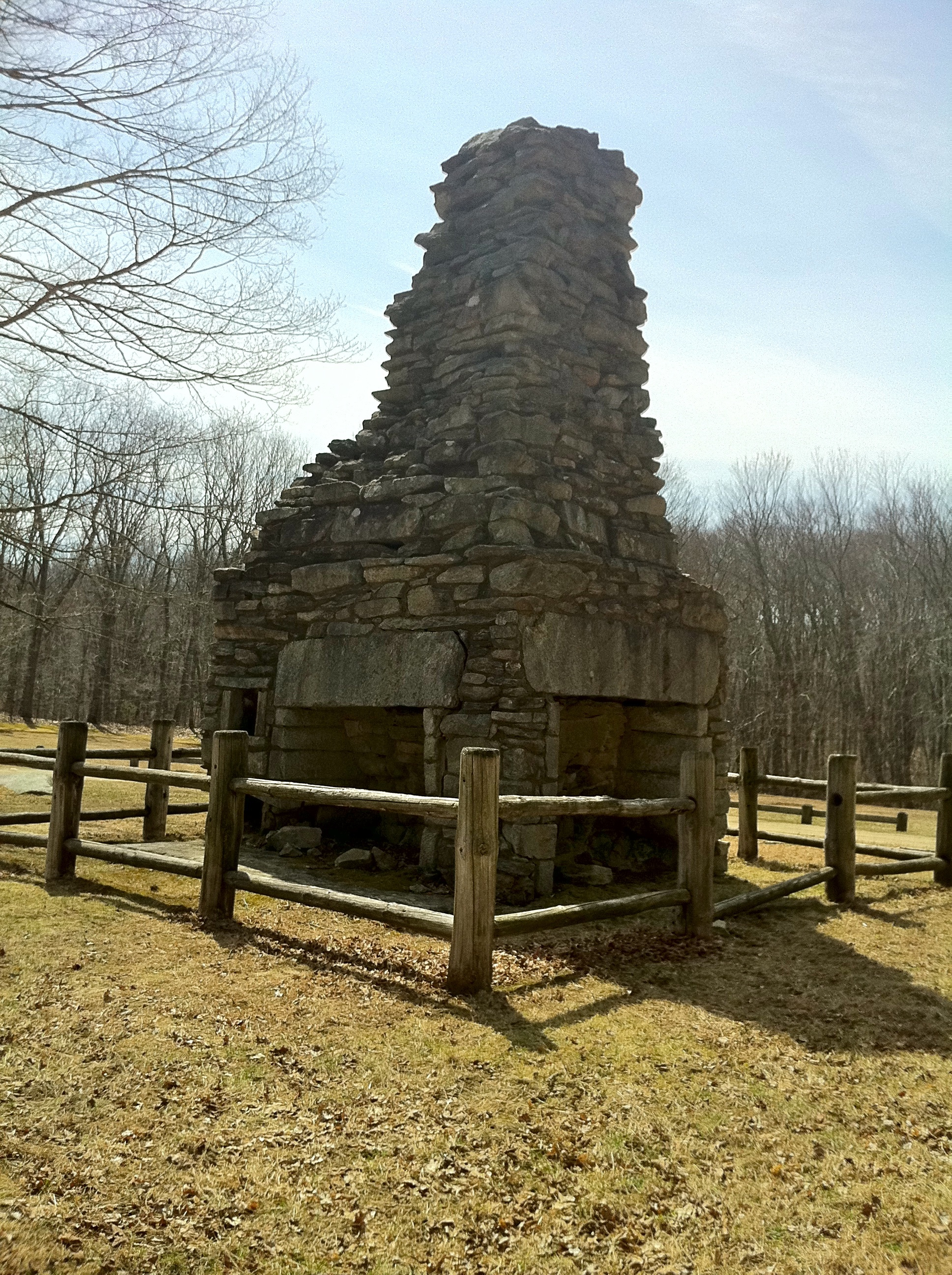
Great 4-fireplace chimney is all that is left of General Nathaniel Lyon's birthplace homestead at Nathaniel Lyon Memorial State Park.

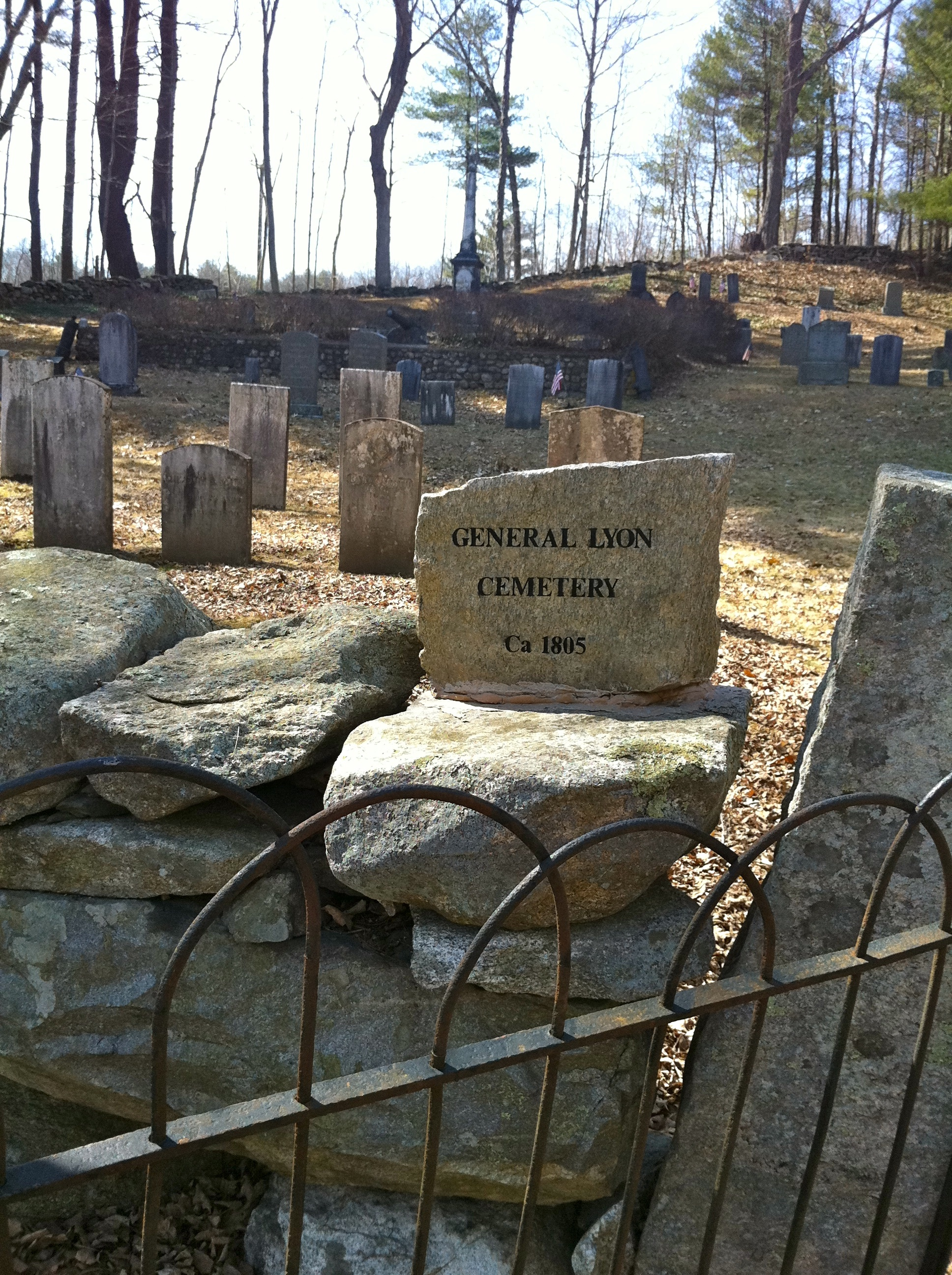
General Lyon Cemetery in Eastford, Connecticut. Established circa 1805. Contains the grave and monument for General Nathaniel Lyon (first Union general to die in the US Civil War.) as well as many mid to late 19th century and Civil War casualty gravestones.

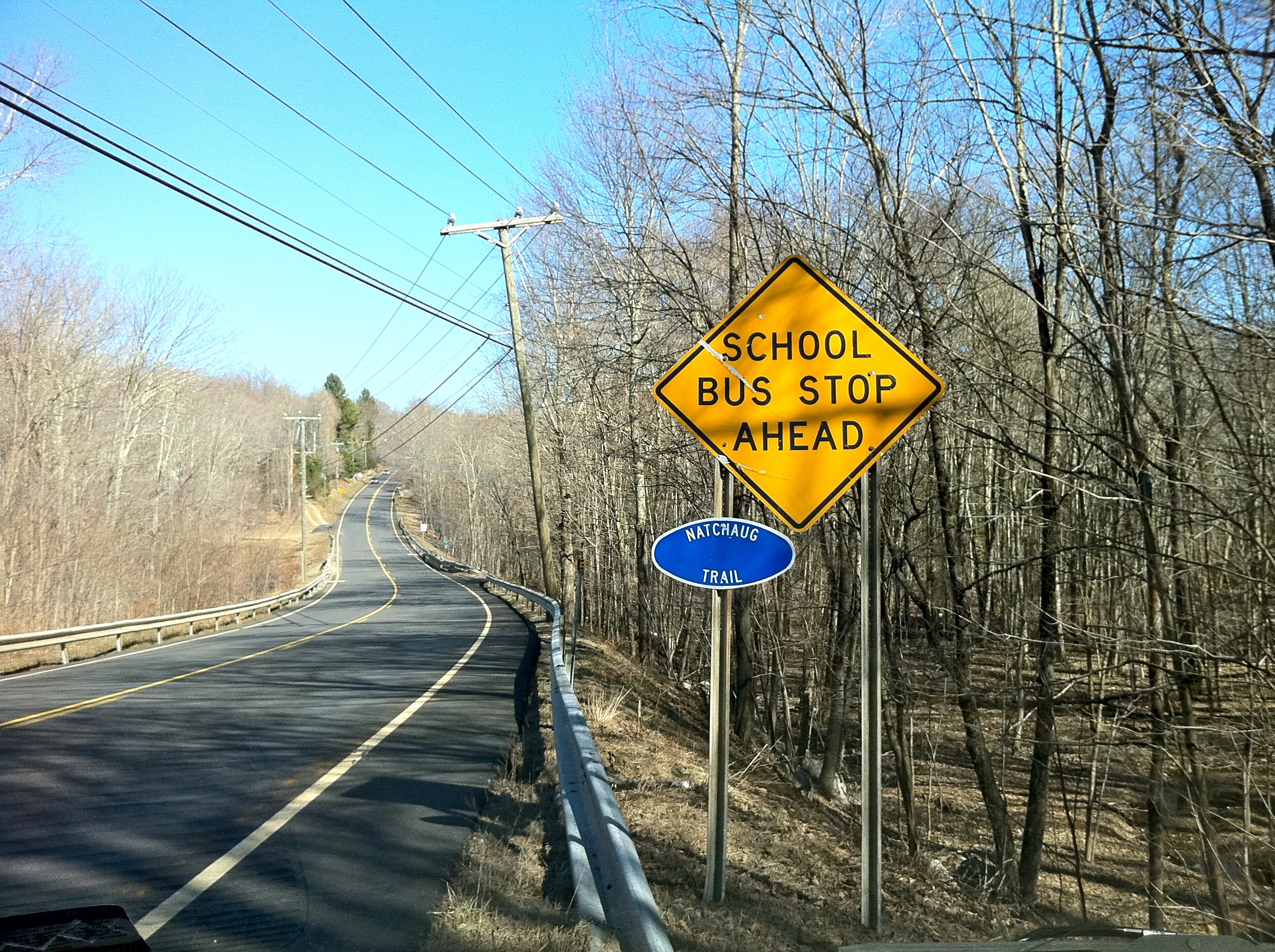
Natchaug Trail sign on Connecticut Route 44. Entrance south to middle sections.

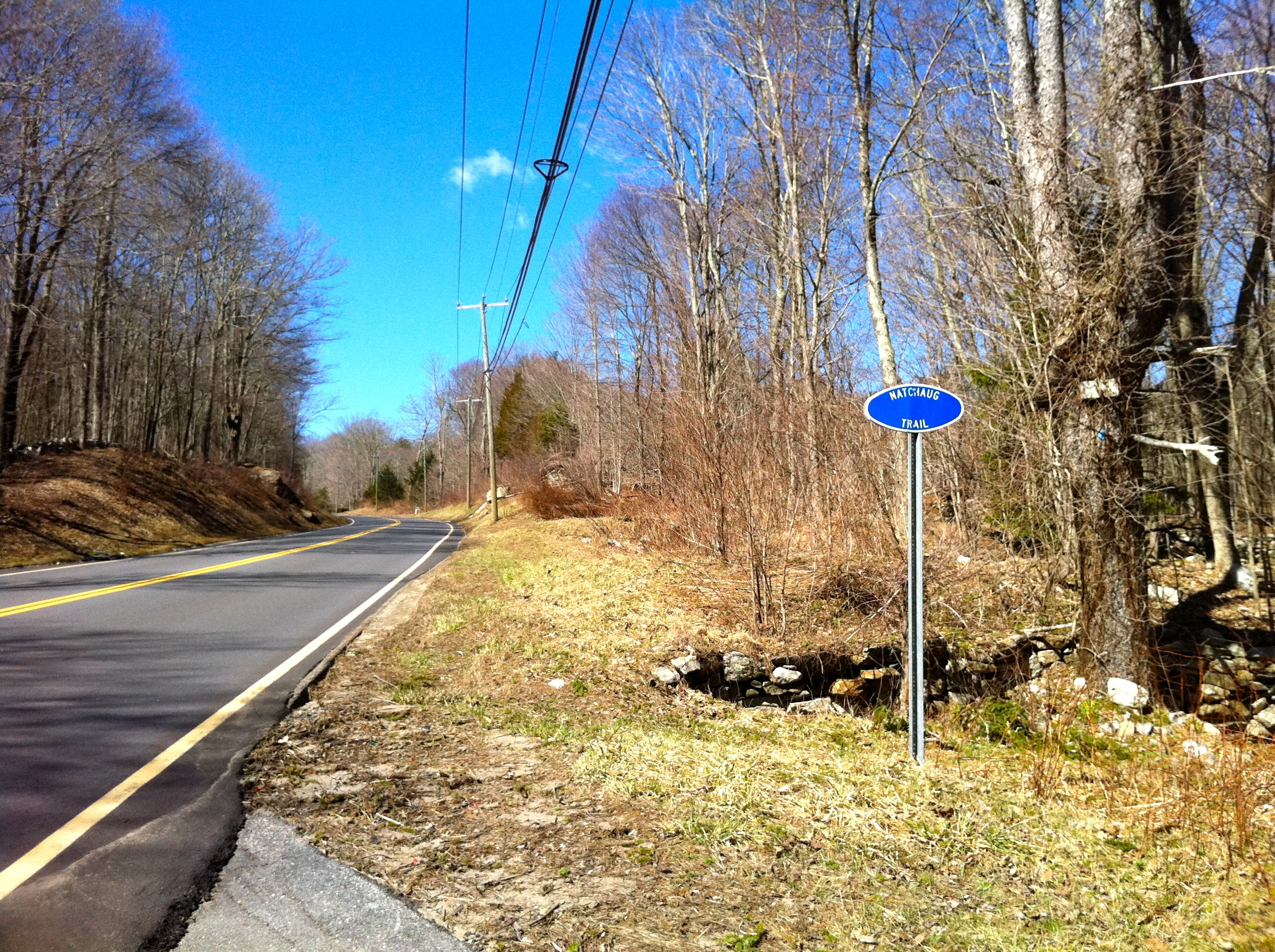
Natchaug Trail sign on Connecticut Route 44. Entrance to northern sections.

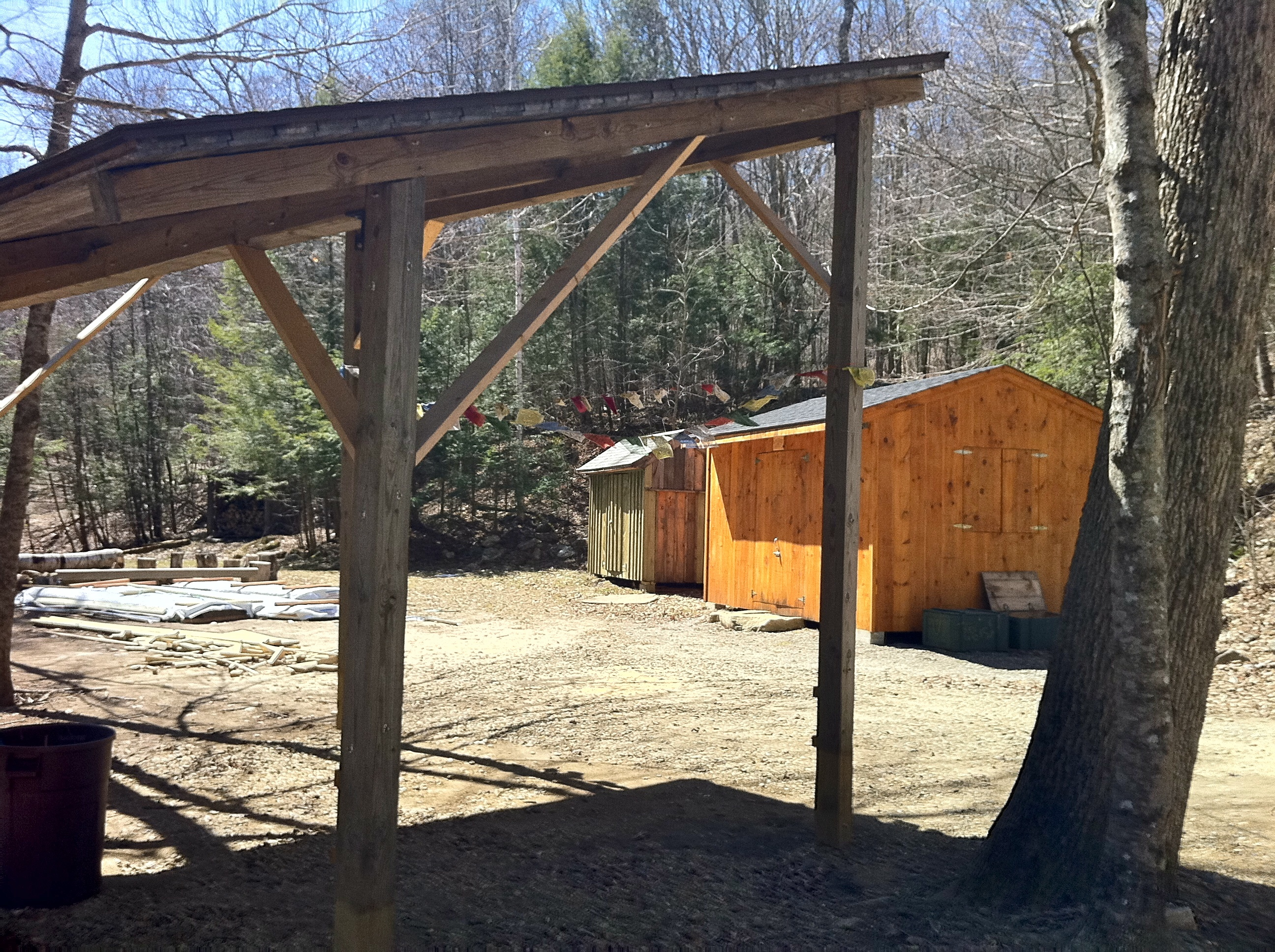
Paul Newman's Own Hole In The Wall Gang Camp campsite off Natchaug Trail

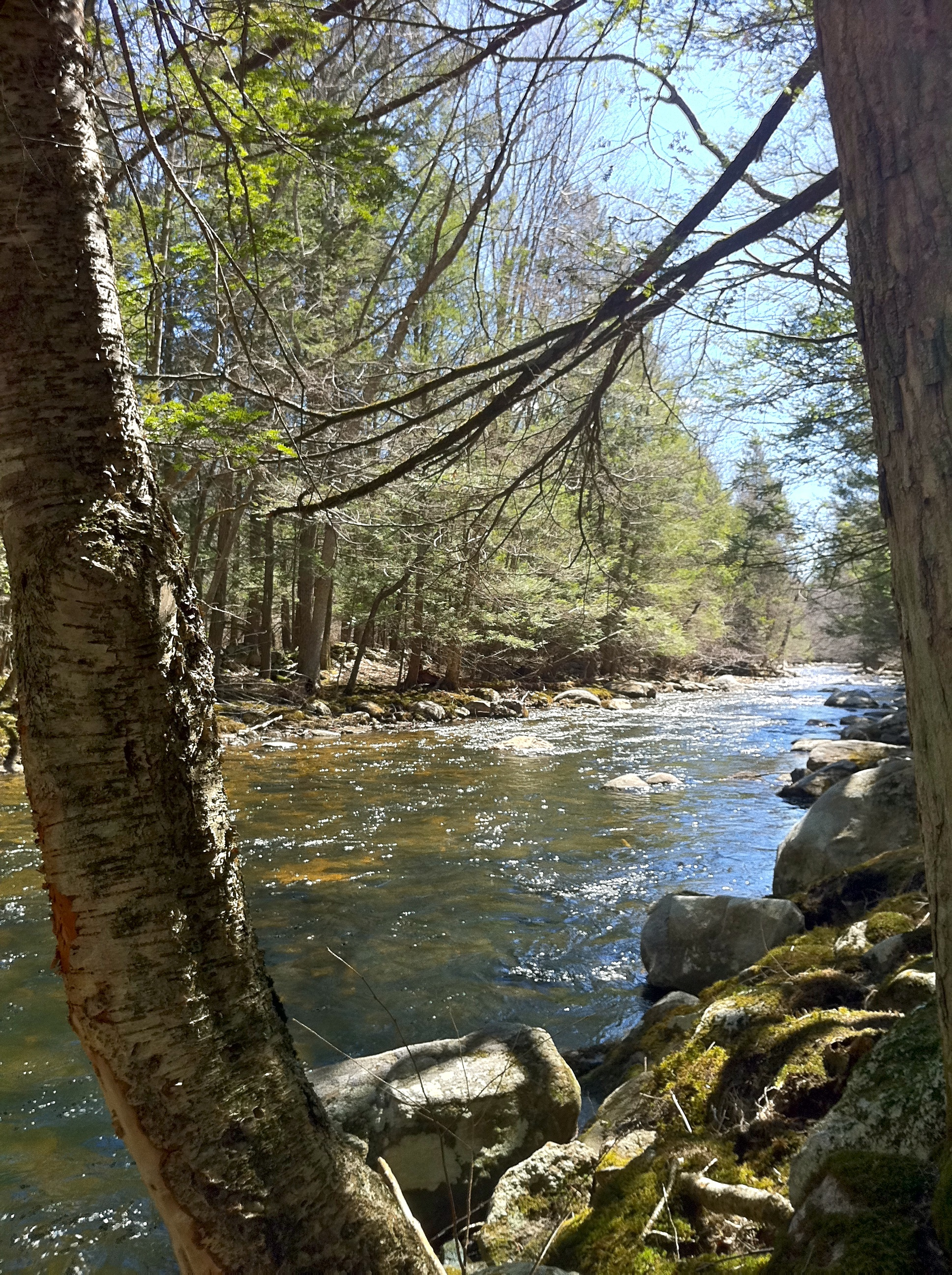
Bigelow Brook in Eastford, CT along Natchaug Trail. Looking South.

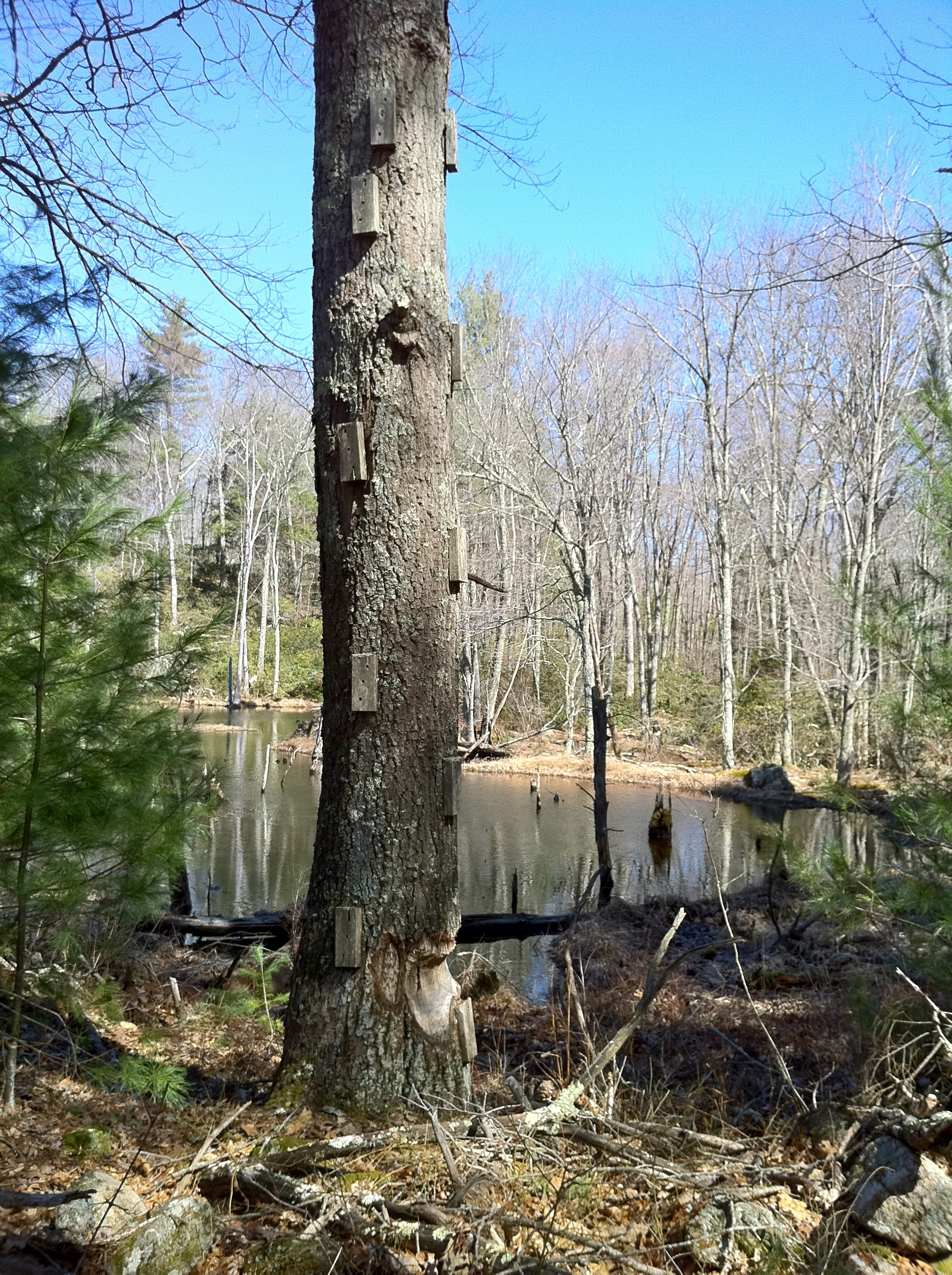
Tree with wood block foot and hand holds at a small pond.

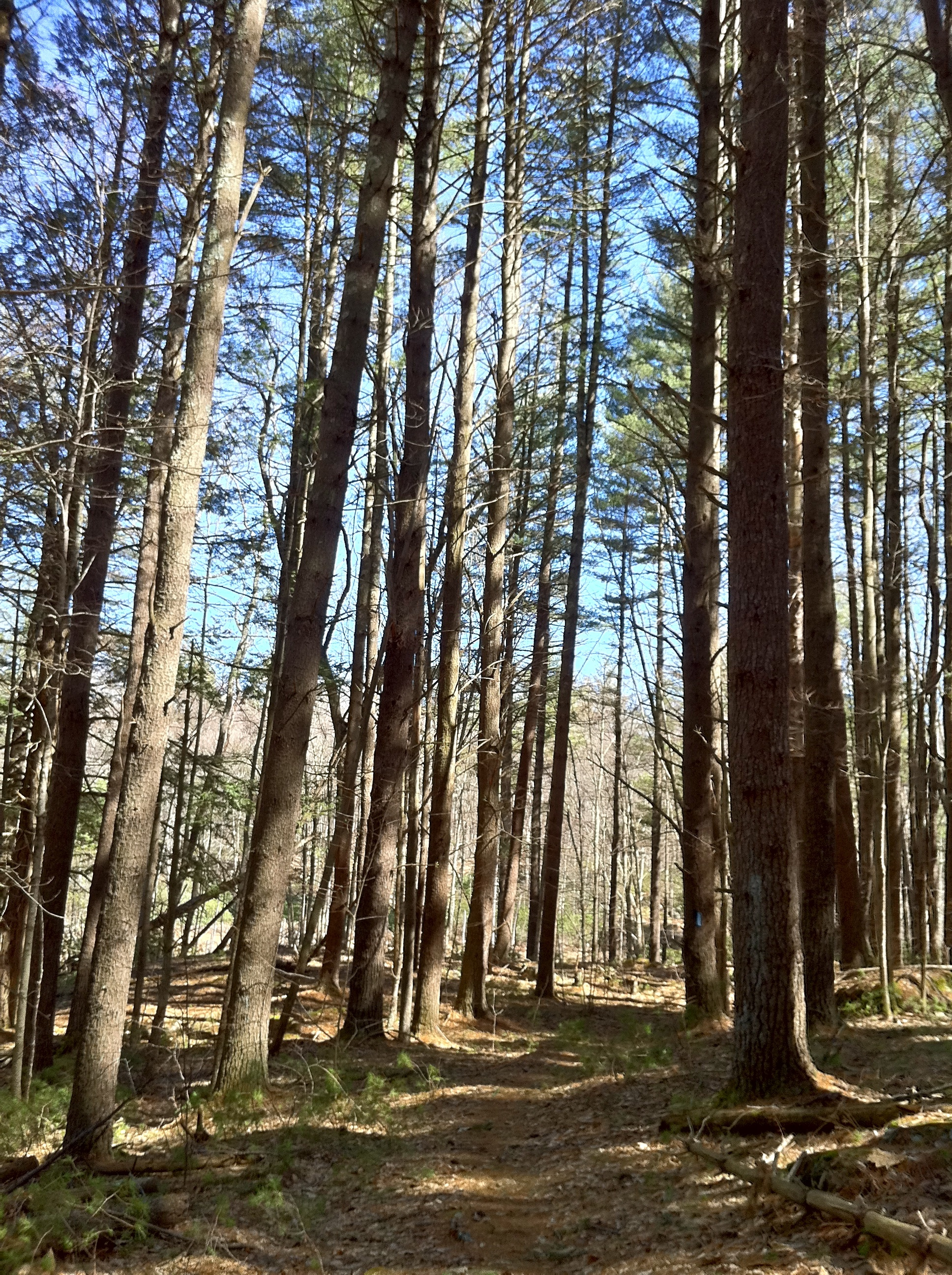
Tall Conifers on both sides of northernmost Natchaug Trail.

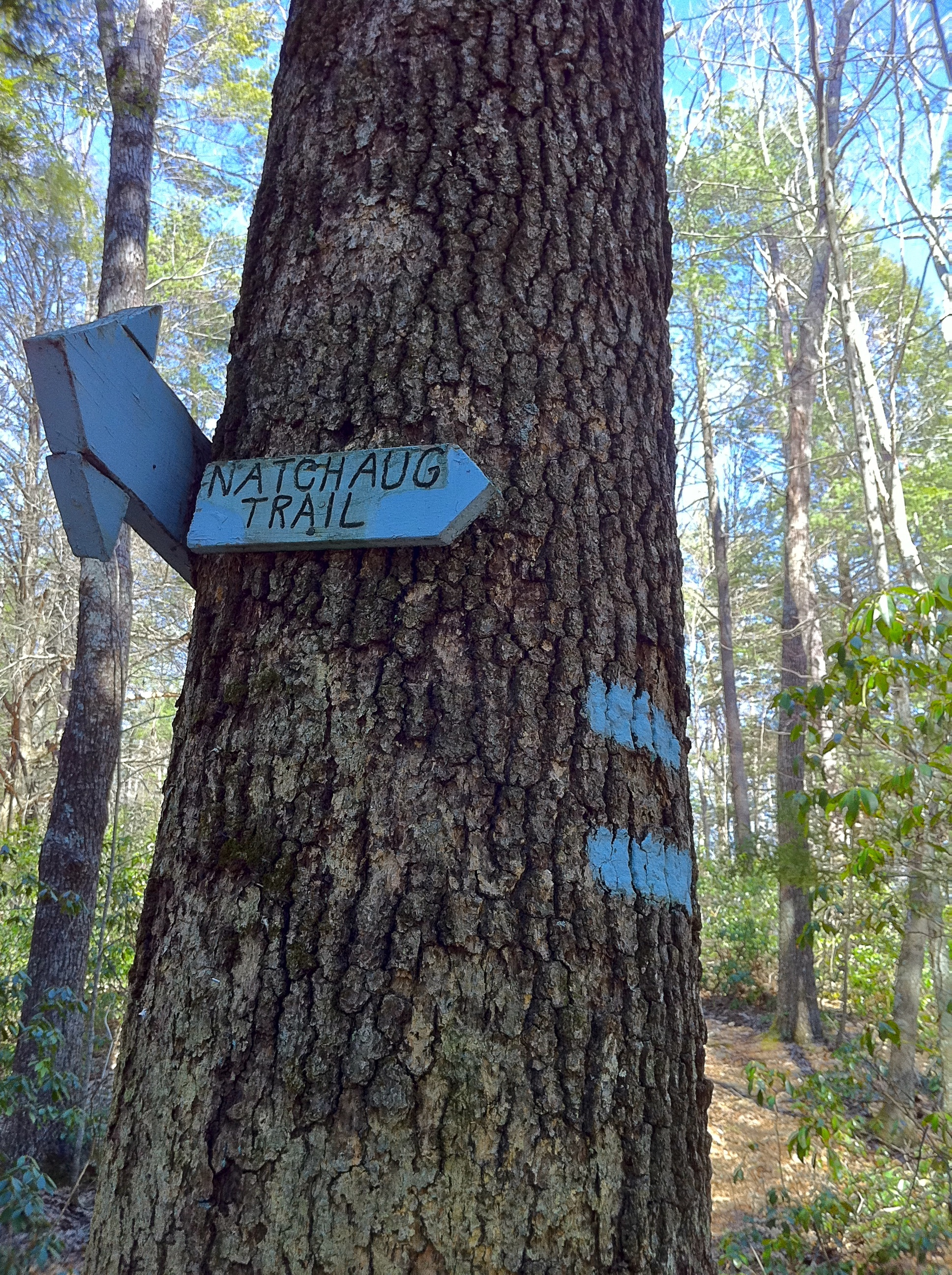
Natchaug Trail northern trailhead at intersection with Nipmuck Trail in Ashford, CT.

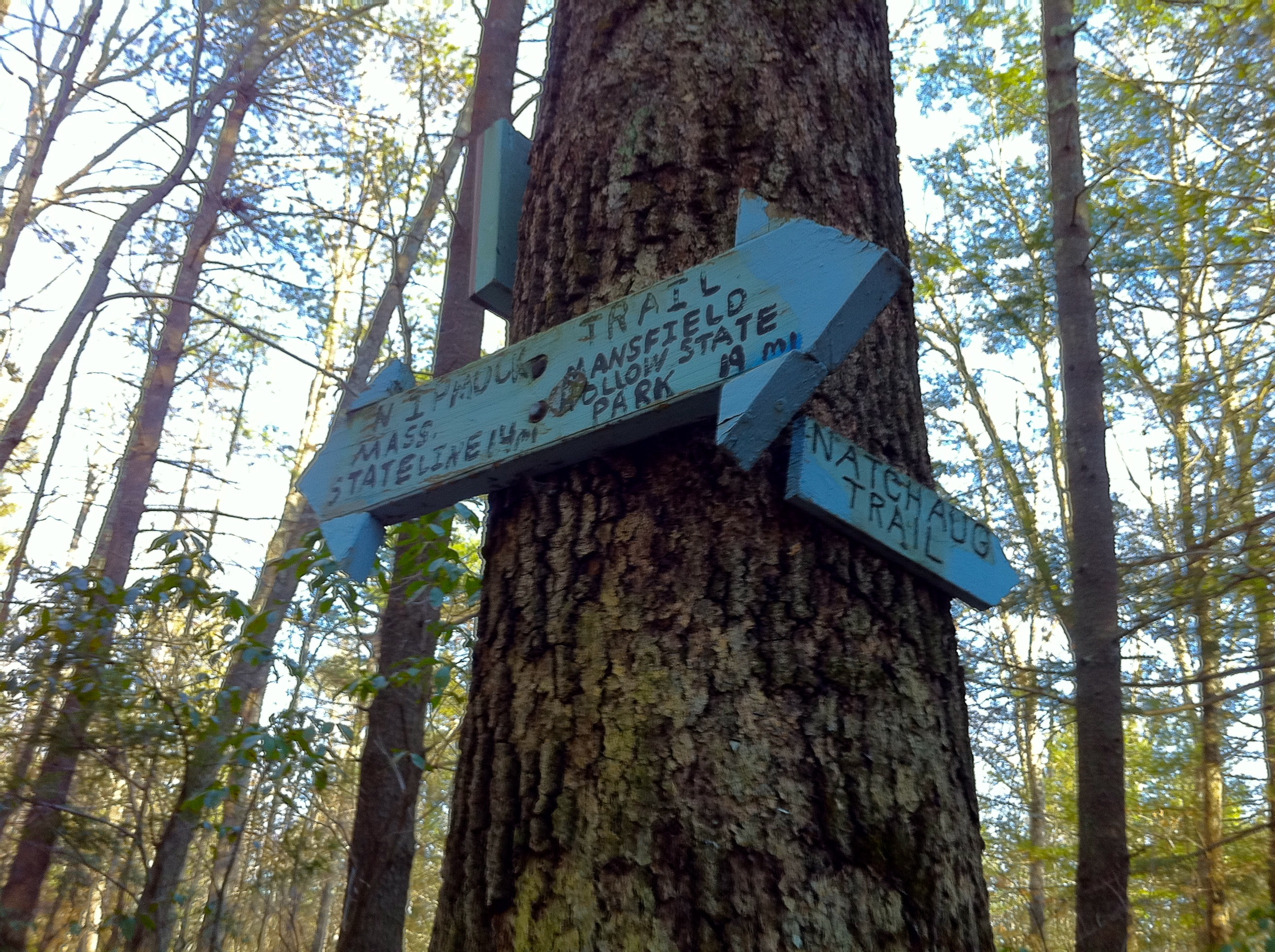
Natchaug Trail northern trailhead at intersection with Nipmuck Trail in Ashford, CT.

== See also ==
- Blue-Blazed Trails
- Connecticut Route 198
- Nipmuck Trail
- Natchaug River
- Natchaug State Forest
- James L. Goodwin State Forest
- List of place names in New England of aboriginal origin
