= Chaplin Historic District =

Historic district in Connecticut, United States

- U.S. National Register of Historic Places
- U.S. Historic district
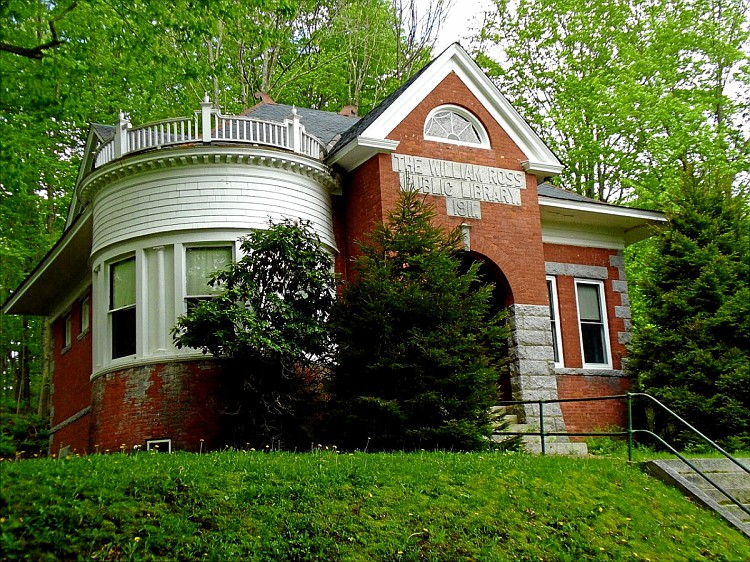
- The former William Ross Public Library building

- Location within Connecticut Location within the United States
- Location: Chaplin Street, Chaplin, Connecticut
- Coordinates: 41°47′38″N 72°7′40″W
- Area: 40 acres (16 ha)
- Built: 1815
- Architectural style: Greek Revival, Federal
- NRHP reference No.: 78002856
- Added to NRHP: October 11, 1978

The Chaplin Historic District in Chaplin, Connecticut is a historic district that was listed on the National Register of Historic Places (NRHP) in 1978. The district encompasses the historic village center of Chaplin, which extends for 0.8 miles (1.3 km) along Chaplin Street, and was most heavily developed in the early 19th century. The focal center of the district is the 1812-15 Congregational Church, which stands on a knoll overlooking the street. Most of the district's buildings are wood-frame houses, although the Witter House (separately listed on the National Register) is a notable brick structure. Stylistically most of the houses are either Federal or Greek Revival in style. In addition to the church, other public buildings include the 1840 former town hall, the 1911 Colonial Revival Ross Memorial Library building, and Eaton's Store, built in 1850.

The area that is now Chaplin was settled in the 18th century, its area divided between the towns of Mansfield, Windham, and Hampton. The impetus to separate the community occurred due to the difficulty of area residents in reaching the churches in those town centers. Benjamin Chaplin, who died in 1795, bequeathed funds for the establishment of a church near his (now no longer standing) home. A village center developed around the church, and the town was incorporated in 1822. The village is unusual in Connecticut for its relatively late development, and thus survives as a good example of early 19th-century town planning. Because the center is not near usable water power, and was bypassed by railroads, it was not affected by later industrialization, and was further preserved when Connecticut Route 198 was routed past it in the 20th century.

== See also ==
- National Register of Historic Places in Windham County, Connecticut
