= James L. Goodwin State Forest =

State forest in Connecticut, US

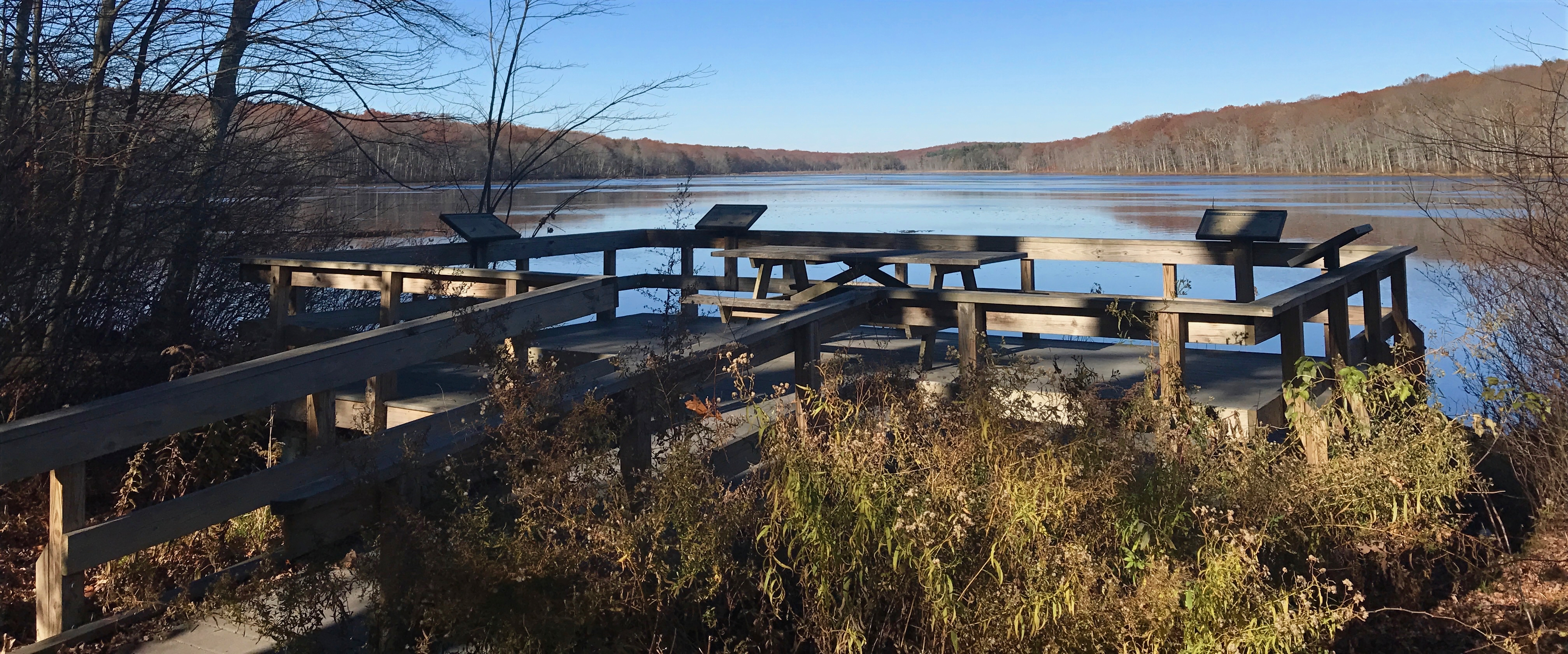
- Observation deck on Pine Acres Lake

- Location within Connecticut Location within the United States
- Location: Chaplin and Hampton, Connecticut, United States
- Coordinates: 41°48′15″N 72°05′43″W
- Area: 2,003 acres (811 ha)
- Elevation: 646 ft (197 m)
- Established: 1964
- Administrator: Connecticut Department of Energy and Environmental Protection
- Website: Official website

James L. Goodwin State Forest is a Connecticut state forest covering approximately 2,000 acres (810 ha) in the towns of Chaplin and Hampton. The lands became public property when James L. Goodwin donated the personal forest he had been developing since 1913 to the state in 1964.

== Features ==
Ponds and trails

The forest encompasses 189-acre (76 ha) Pine Acres Lake and two smaller ponds, 18-acre (7.3 ha) Black Spruce Pond and 14-acre (5.7 ha) Brown Hill Pond, that are used for fishing and canoeing. The forest has 14 miles (23 km) of trails for hiking, cross-country skiing, and horseback riding. Trails include sections of the blue-blazed Natchaug Trail and the Air Line State Park Trail.

Education center

The Goodwin Forest Conservation Education Center is an environmental education facility operated by the Connecticut Department of Energy and Environmental Protection in partnership with the Connecticut Forest and Park Association. Programs are offered for schools, the public, and educators. Forest management programs are also offered for landowners, foresters, loggers, and municipal-land-use commissioners. The site includes a wildlife garden, a small nature museum, the southern shore of Pine Acres Pond, and a youth group campsite.
