= Benjamin Bosworth House =

Historic house in Connecticut, United States

- U.S. National Register of Historic Places
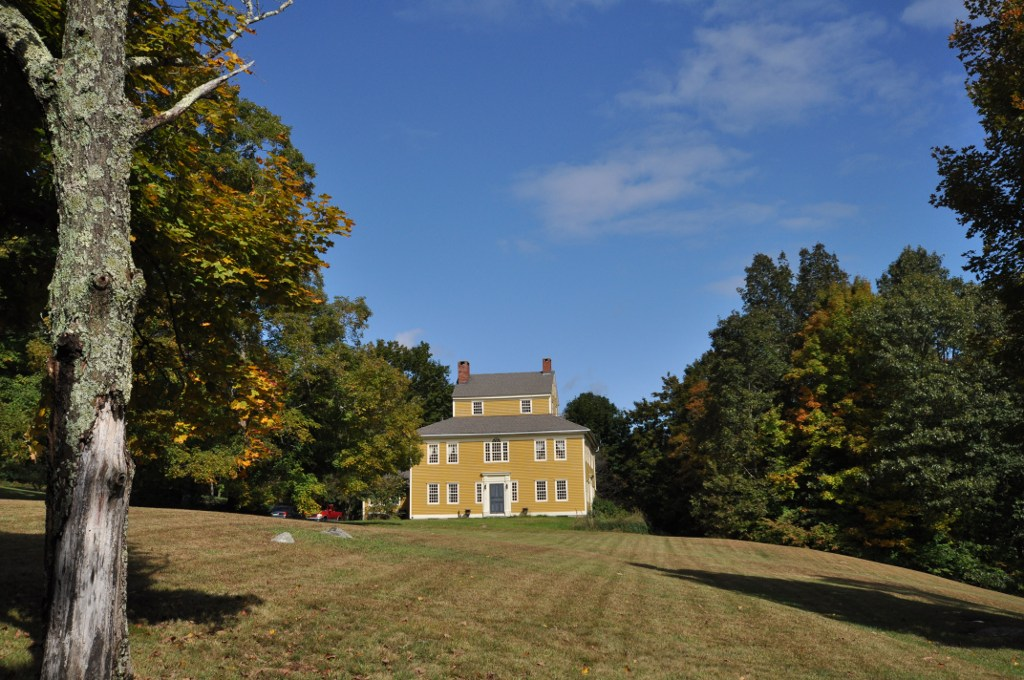

- Location within Connecticut Location within the United States
- Location: John Perry Road, Eastford, Connecticut
- Coordinates: 41°53′59″N 72°5′3″W
- Area: 3.5 acres (1.4 ha)
- Built: 1791
- Architect: Goodell, Vini
- Architectural style: Federal
- NRHP reference No.: 78002857
- Added to NRHP: February 17, 1978

The Benjamin Bosworth House is a historic house on John Perry Road in Eastford, Connecticut. Built between 1791 and 1801, it is an imposing local example of Federal period architecture. It was listed on the National Register of Historic Places in 1978.

== Description and history ==
The Benjamin Bosworth House is located southwest of Eastford's village center, on the west side of John Perry Road north of its junction with Church Road. It is a three-story wood-frame structure, with a two-story main block topped by a hip roof from which a full-height monitor section projects. Eleven fireplaces, five bedrooms, five bathrooms, one (former) Masonic Lodge, one living room, one dining room, two great halls, a front parlor, office, workshop, kitchen, pantry, and laundry room are contained in the home. A precariously placed barn is also located on the property.

Benjamin Bosworth was a bachelor who owned several local farms. He hired area craftsman and architect Vinni Goodell to construct the home. The third floor of the single-family residence was a Masonic Lodge, where two fireplaces and built-in benches remain intact. The house is also unusual for its monitor roof, a rarity in Federal period construction. The current owners are the fourth family to occupy the home.

The original curved staircase in the south-facing entry was removed and auctioned off shortly after the Great Depression. Hard-carved wood paneling in the Front Parlor was allegedly solicited by the Henry Ford museum for removal but remains intact to date. Recent owners have been carefully renovating the building since 2002 and emulating the original conditions based on archival research and examined findings within the home.

== See also ==
- National Register of Historic Places listings in Windham County, Connecticut
