= Chaplin, Connecticut =

- Town
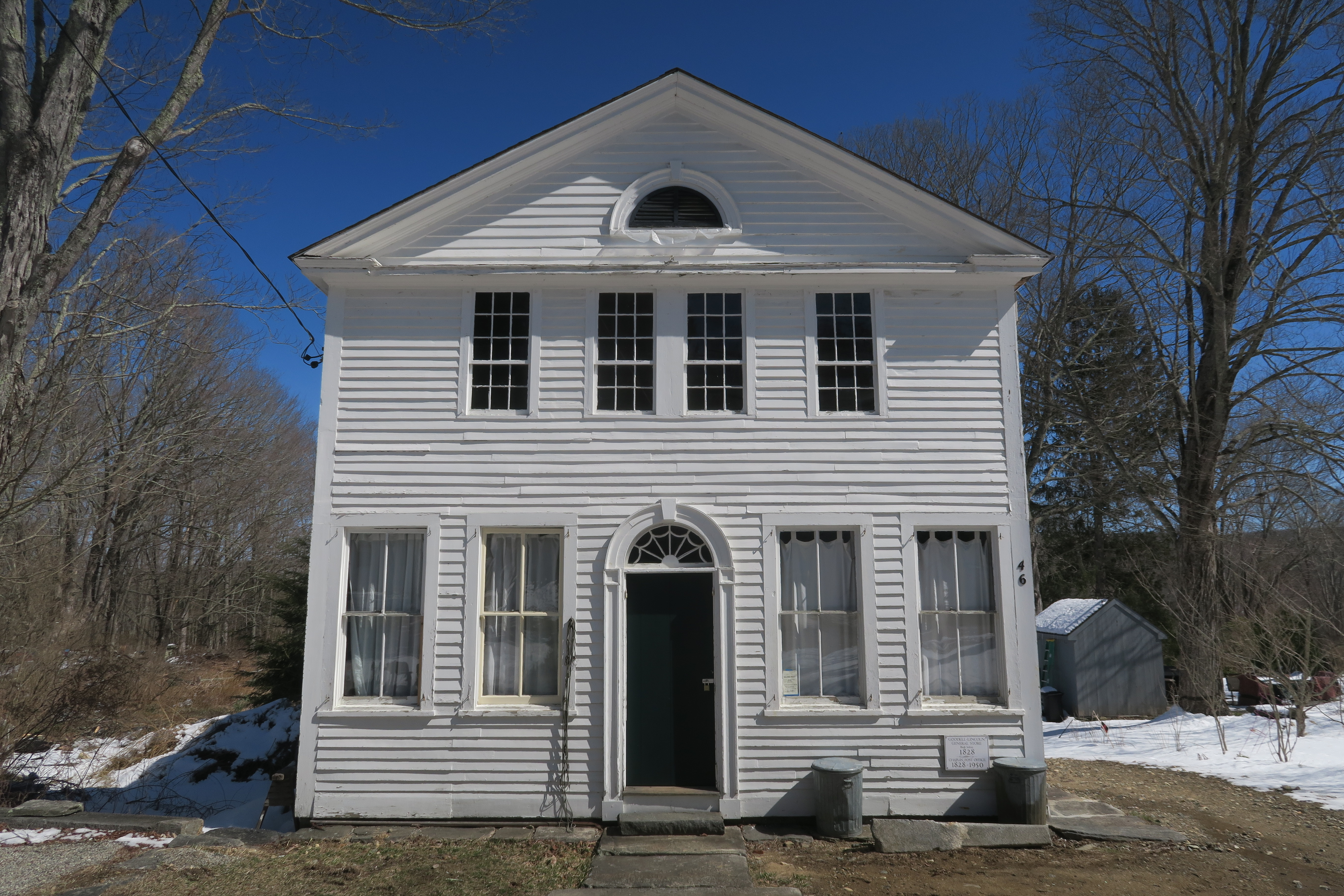
- Goodell Lincoln General Store

- Seal
- Interactive map of Chaplin, Connecticut
- Coordinates: 41°48′N 72°8′W
- Country: United States
- U.S. state: Connecticut
- County: Windham
- Region: Northeastern CT
- Incorporated: 1822

Government
  - Type: Selectman-town meeting
  - First selectman: Juan Roman III (R)
  - Selectman: Kenneth Fortier (R)
  - Selectman: Joe Pinto (D)

Area
  - Total: 19.6 sq mi (50.8 km^{2})
  - Land: 19.4 sq mi (50.3 km^{2})
  - Water: 0.12 sq mi (0.3 km^{2})
- Elevation: 390 ft (119 m)

Population
  - Total: 2,151
  - Density: 111/sq mi (42.8/km^{2})
- Time zone: UTC-5 (EST)
  - Summer (DST): UTC-4 (EDT)
- ZIP code: 06235
- Area codes: 860/959
- FIPS code: 09-13810
- GNIS feature ID: 0213405
- Website: chaplinct.org

Chaplin is a town in Windham County, Connecticut, United States. The town is part of the Northeastern Connecticut Planning Region. The town was named for Deacon Benjamin Chaplin, an early settler. The population was 2,151 at the 2020 census.

== Points of interest ==
- The Chaplin Museum is a local historical museum.
- Diana's Pool is located in the town, on the Natchaug River.
- The town has two sites on the National Register of Historic Places:
  - Chaplin Historic District on Chaplin Street (added November 11, 1978)
  - Witter House on Chaplin Street (added November 6, 1970)

== Geography ==
According to the United States Census Bureau, the town has a total area of 19.6 square miles (51 km^{2}), of which 19.4 square miles (50 km^{2}) is land and 0.1 square miles (0.26 km^{2}) (0.66%) is water.

=== Principal communities ===
- Chaplin Center
- South Chaplin

== Demographics ==
Historical population
| Census | Pop. | Note | %± |
|---|---|---|---|
| 1850 | 796 | | — |
| 1860 | 781 | | −1.9% |
| 1870 | 704 | | −9.9% |
| 1880 | 627 | | −10.9% |
| 1890 | 542 | | −13.6% |
| 1900 | 529 | | −2.4% |
| 1910 | 435 | | −17.8% |
| 1920 | 385 | | −11.5% |
| 1930 | 414 | | 7.5% |
| 1940 | 489 | | 18.1% |
| 1950 | 712 | | 45.6% |
| 1960 | 1,230 | | 72.8% |
| 1970 | 1,621 | | 31.8% |
| 1980 | 1,793 | | 10.6% |
| 1990 | 2,048 | | 14.2% |
| 2000 | 2,250 | | 9.9% |
| 2010 | 2,305 | | 2.4% |
| 2020 | 2,151 | | −6.7% |
U.S. Decennial Census

At the 2000 census there were 2,250 people, 858 households, and 614 families living in the town. The population density was 115.8 inhabitants per square mile (44.7/km^{2}). There were 897 housing units at an average density of 46.2 per square mile (17.8/km^{2}). The racial makeup of the town was 97.29% White, 0.71% African American, 0.27% Native American, 0.36% Asian, 0.31% from other races, and 1.07% from two or more races. Hispanic or Latino people of any race were 1.96%.

Of the 858 households 33.6% had children under the age of 18 living with them, 58.6% were married couples living together, 9.1% had a female householder with no husband present, and 28.4% were non-families. 20.4% of households were one person and 5.7% were one person aged 65 or older. The average household size was 2.62 and the average family size was 3.03.

The age distribution was 24.6% under the age of 18, 7.6% from 18 to 24, 34.5% from 25 to 44, 25.1% from 45 to 64, and 8.1% 65 or older. The median age was 37 years. For every 100 females, there were 102.3 males. For every 100 females age 18 and over, there were 99.8 males.

The median household income was $51,602 and the median family income was $55,263. Males had a median income of $39,300 versus $30,430 for females. The per capita income for the town was $22,101. About 2.9% of families and 2.9% of the population were below the poverty line, including 0.9% of those under age 18 and 11.0% of those age 65 or over.

Voter registration and party enrollment as of October 29, 2019
| Party | Active voters | Inactive voters | Total voters | Percentage |
|---|---|---|---|---|
| Republican | 487 | 6 | 493 | 30.91% |
| Democratic | 439 | 12 | 451 | 28.28% |
| Unaffiliated | 612 | 19 | 631 | 39.56% |
| Minor parties | 20 | 0 | 20 | 1.25% |
| Total | 1,558 | 37 | 1,595 | 100% |

Presidential election results
| Year | Democratic | Republican | Third parties |
|---|---|---|---|
| 2020 | 46.4% 598 | 51.3% 662 | 2.3% 30 |
| 2016 | 37.8% 434 | 54.4% 624 | 7.8% 89 |
| 2012 | 54.4% 584 | 43.4% 466 | 2.2% 24 |
| 2008 | 59.0% 663 | 39.2% 440 | 1.8% 20 |
| 2004 | 52.0% 590 | 44.5% 505 | 3.5% 30 |
| 2000 | 49.8% 516 | 38.9% 403 | 11.3% 118 |
| 1996 | 45.5% 418 | 30.0% 276 | 24.5% 225 |
| 1992 | 39.2% 417 | 25.9% 276 | 34.9% 371 |
| 1988 | 49.7% 420 | 49.1% 315 | 1.2% 10 |
| 1984 | 37.7% 294 | 62.1% 484 | 0.2% 1 |
| 1980 | 33.9% 261 | 49.0% 378 | 17.1% 132 |
| 1976 | 47.2% 334 | 52.3% 370 | 0.5% 3 |
| 1972 | 45.4% 339 | 54.2% 404 | 0.4% 3 |
| 1968 | 46.9% 305 | 48.8% 317 | 4.3% 28 |
| 1964 | 69.5% 460 | 30.5% 202 | 0.00% 0 |
| 1960 | 41.1% 289 | 58.9% 366 | 0.00% 0 |
| 1956 | 28.8% 142 | 71.2% 365 | 0.00% 0 |

== Notable people ==
- Charles H. Backus (1856–1929), Illinois state representative and businessman
