= Eastford, Connecticut =

- Town
- Town of Eastford
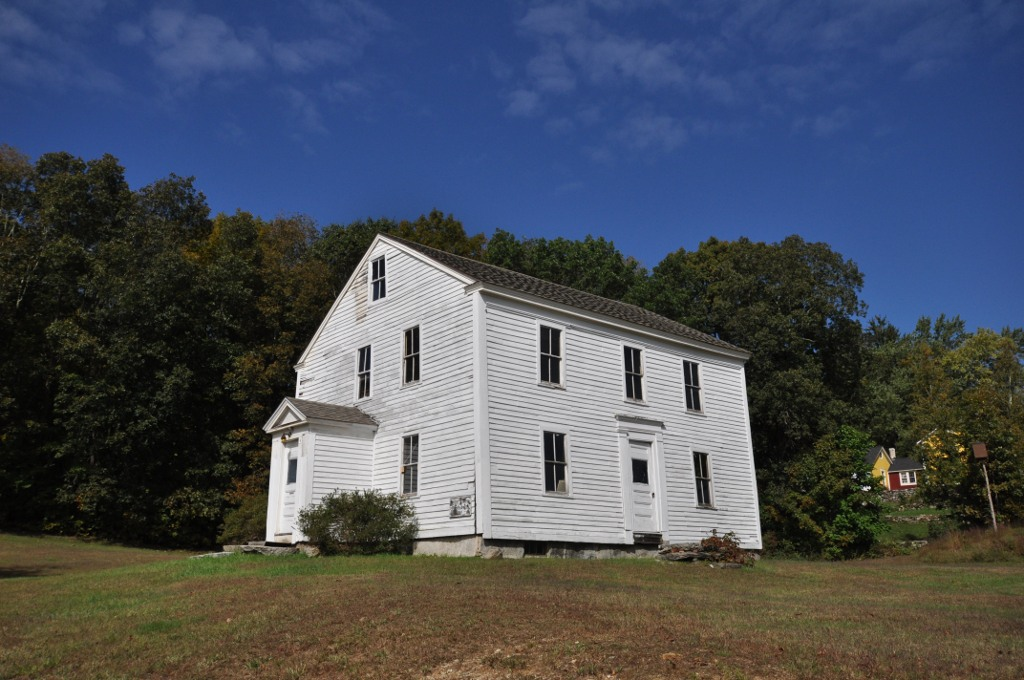
- The Union Society of Phoenixville House

- Seal Logo
- Interactive map of Eastford, Connecticut
- Coordinates: 41°53′37″N 72°05′49″W
- Country: United States
- U.S. state: Connecticut
- County: Windham
- Region: Northeastern CT
- Incorporated: 1847

Government
  - Type: Selectman-town meeting
  - First selectman: Deborah Richards (R)
  - State Senator: Jeff Gordon (R-35th District)
  - State Rep.: Pat Boyd (D-50th District)

Area
  - Total: 29.2 sq mi (75.6 km^{2})
  - Land: 28.9 sq mi (74.8 km^{2})
  - Water: 0.35 sq mi (0.9 km^{2})
- Elevation: 653 ft (199 m)

Population (2020)
  - Total: 1,649
  - Density: 57.1/sq mi (22.0/km^{2})
- Time zone: UTC-5 (Eastern)
  - Summer (DST): UTC-4 (Eastern)
- ZIP code: 06242
- Area codes: 860/959
- FIPS code: 09-21860
- GNIS feature ID: 213420
- Website: eastfordct.gov

Eastford is a town in Windham County, Connecticut, United States. The town is part of the Northeastern Connecticut Planning Region. The population was 1,649 at the 2020 census.

== History ==
Eastford was formed in 1847 when it separated from Ashford, Connecticut. The name "Eastford" is locational, for the town is east of Ashford.

== Geography ==
According to the United States Census Bureau, the town has a total area of 29.2 square miles (76 km^{2}), of which 28.9 square miles (75 km^{2}) is land and 0.3 square miles (0.78 km^{2}) (1.20%) is water.

=== Principal communities ===
- Phoenixville—A 1930s book describes it as "a small crossroads hamlet on Still River, which grew up around a twine mill (1831), now abandoned."
- East Phoenixville
- North Ashford

== On the National Register of Historic Places ==
- Benjamin Bosworth House – John Perry Road (added 1978)
- Natchaug Forest Lumber Shed – Kingsbury Road, Natchaug State Forest (added 1986)
- Sumner-Carpenter House – 333 Old Colony Road (added 1991)
- Union Society of Phoenixville House – 4 Hartford Turnpike (added 2007)

== Demographics ==
Historical population
Census	Pop.	Note	%±
1850	1,127		—
1860	1,005		−10.8%
1870	984		−2.1%
1880	855		−13.1%
1890	561		−34.4%
1900	523		−6.8%
1910	513		−1.9%
1920	496		−3.3%
1930	529		6.7%
1940	496		−6.2%
1950	598		20.6%
1960	746		24.7%
1970	922		23.6%
1980	1,028		11.5%
1990	1,314		27.8%
2000	1,618		23.1%
2010	1,749		8.1%
2020	1,649		−5.7%
U.S. Decennial Census

At the 2000 census there were 1,618 people, 618 households, and 451 families living in the town. The population density was 56.0 inhabitants per square mile (21.6/km^{2}). There were 705 housing units at an average density of 24.4 per square mile (9.4/km^{2}). The racial makeup of the town was 97.78% White, 0.43% African American, 0.19% Native American, 0.37% Asian, 0.31% from other races, and 0.93% from two or more races. Hispanic or Latino of any race were 1.36%.

There were 618 households, out of which 100 have children under the age of 18 living with them, 63.1% were married couples living together, 6.1% had a female householder with no husband present, and 27.0% were non-families. 21.8% of households were one person, and 9.1% were one person aged 65 or older. The average household size was 2.62 and the average family size was 3.06.

The age distribution was 26.3% under the age of 18, 5.6% from 18 to 24, 29.2% from 25 to 44, 25.4% from 45 to 64, and 13.4% 65 or older. The median age was 39 years. For every 100 females, there were 103.0 males. For every 100 females age 18 and over, there were 101.0 males.

The median household income was $57,159 and the median family income was $62,031. Males had a median income of $45,000 versus $31,964 for females. The per capita income for the town was $25,364. About 4.4% of families and 6.0% of the population were below the poverty line, including 10.0% of those under age 18 and 3.7% of those age 65 or over.

Eastford is a strongly Republican town. The town has voted for the Republican candidate every time since the 1856 election and since its founding in 1847 has never voted for a Democrat for president, the only town in Connecticut with this distinction. Even during President Lyndon B. Johnson's landslide in 1964, Eastford voters still preferred Barry Goldwater, the Republican candidate, by a comfortable 11.2% margin. Since 1992, however, the Democratic candidate has been more competitive. President Barack Obama only lost to Mitt Romney by 1 vote in 2012.

Presidential election results
Year	Democratic	Republican	Third Parties
2020	43.5% 464	53.6% 572	2.9% 31
2016	38.6% 367	54.0% 513	7.4% 69
2012	49.0% 464	49.1% 465	1.9% 18
2008	48.9% 485	49.2% 488	1.9% 18
2004	44.0% 416	54.3% 513	1.7% 16
2000	44.3% 375	49.7% 421	6.0% 50
1996	38.1% 301	41.7% 329	20.2% 159
1992	32.7% 285	39.5% 344	27.8% 242
1988	34.9% 253	63.8% 463	1.3% 9
1984	26.2% 172	73.1% 479	0.7% 4
1980	29.1% 183	55.7% 350	15.2% 95
1976	36.0% 204	63.4% 359	0.6% 3
1972	29.6% 152	69.9% 359	0.5% 2
1968	24.4% 103	72.4% 305	3.2% 13
1964	44.4% 188	55.6% 236	0.00% 0
1960	21.0% 82	79.0% 309	0.00% 0
1956	15.6% 62	84.4% 335	0.00% 0

== Education ==
Residents are zoned to the Eastford School District for grades Preschool through 8. The only school in the district is Eastford Elementary School. Most high schoolers attend Woodstock Academy. The town is near five alternative high schools: Ellis Vocational Technical School, Windham Technical School, Killingly Vocational Agricultural High School, ACT High School, and Quinebaug Middle College.

== Notable people ==
- Andrew T. Judson (1784–1853), United States federal judge and US Congressman
- Nathaniel Lyon (1818–1861), the first Union General to be killed in the Civil War, buried here in his family plot

== Trivia ==
There was once another Eastford in the state, which was renamed East Windsor shortly after its separation from Windsor.

Eastford is the site of Frog Rock, a rest stop and roadside attraction on U.S. Route 44.
