= Charles F. Wilcox =

American architect

Charles Field Wilcox
- Born: January 8, 1845; Georgia
- Died: July 12, 1905; Providence, Rhode Island
- Occupation: Architect
- Practice: Hartshorn & Wilcox, C. F. Wilcox, Wilcox & Congdon
- Buildings: Congdon Street Baptist Church, Union Baptist Church, Burrows Block, Conant Memorial Church

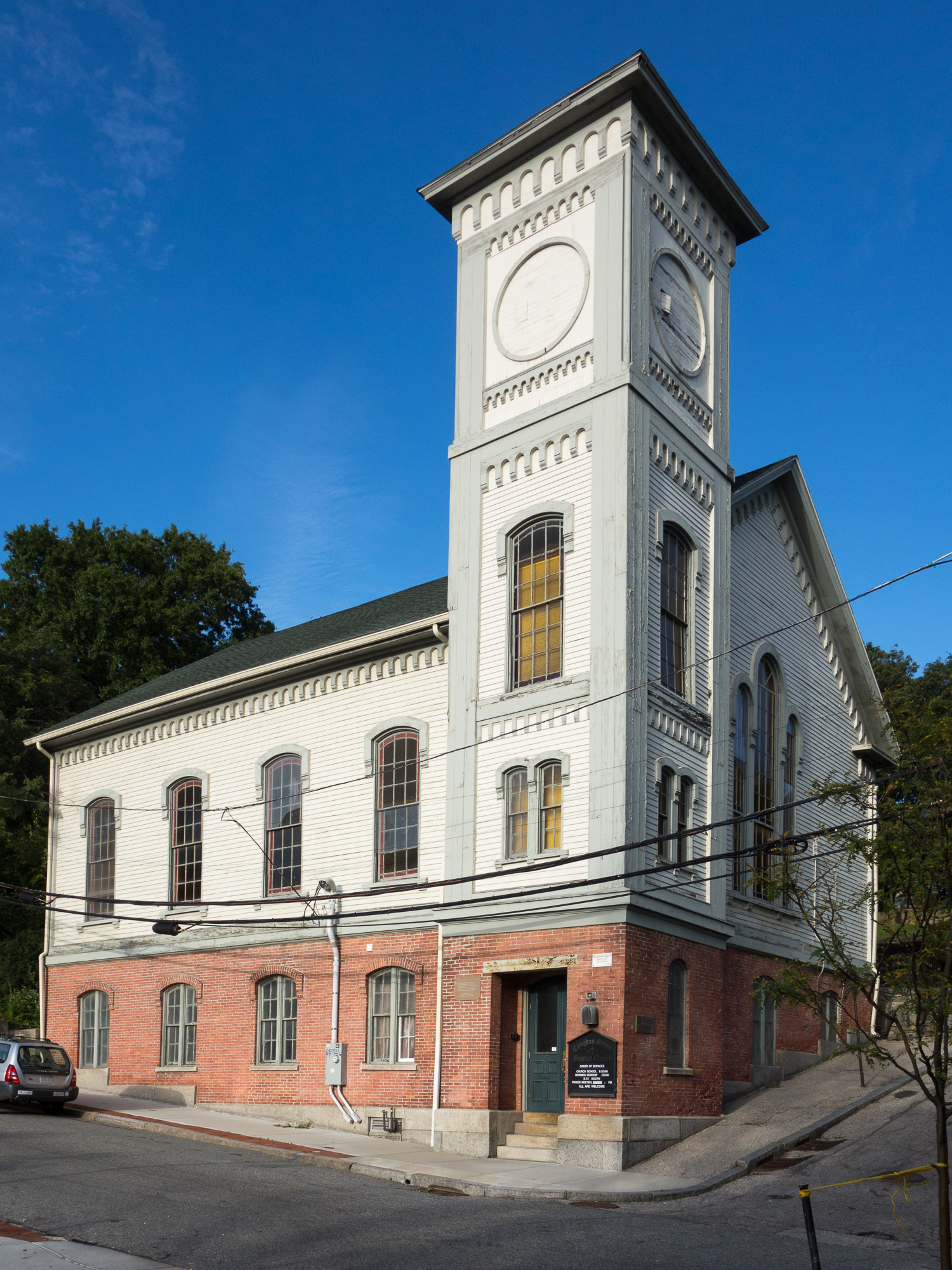
Congdon Street Church, Providence, 1874.

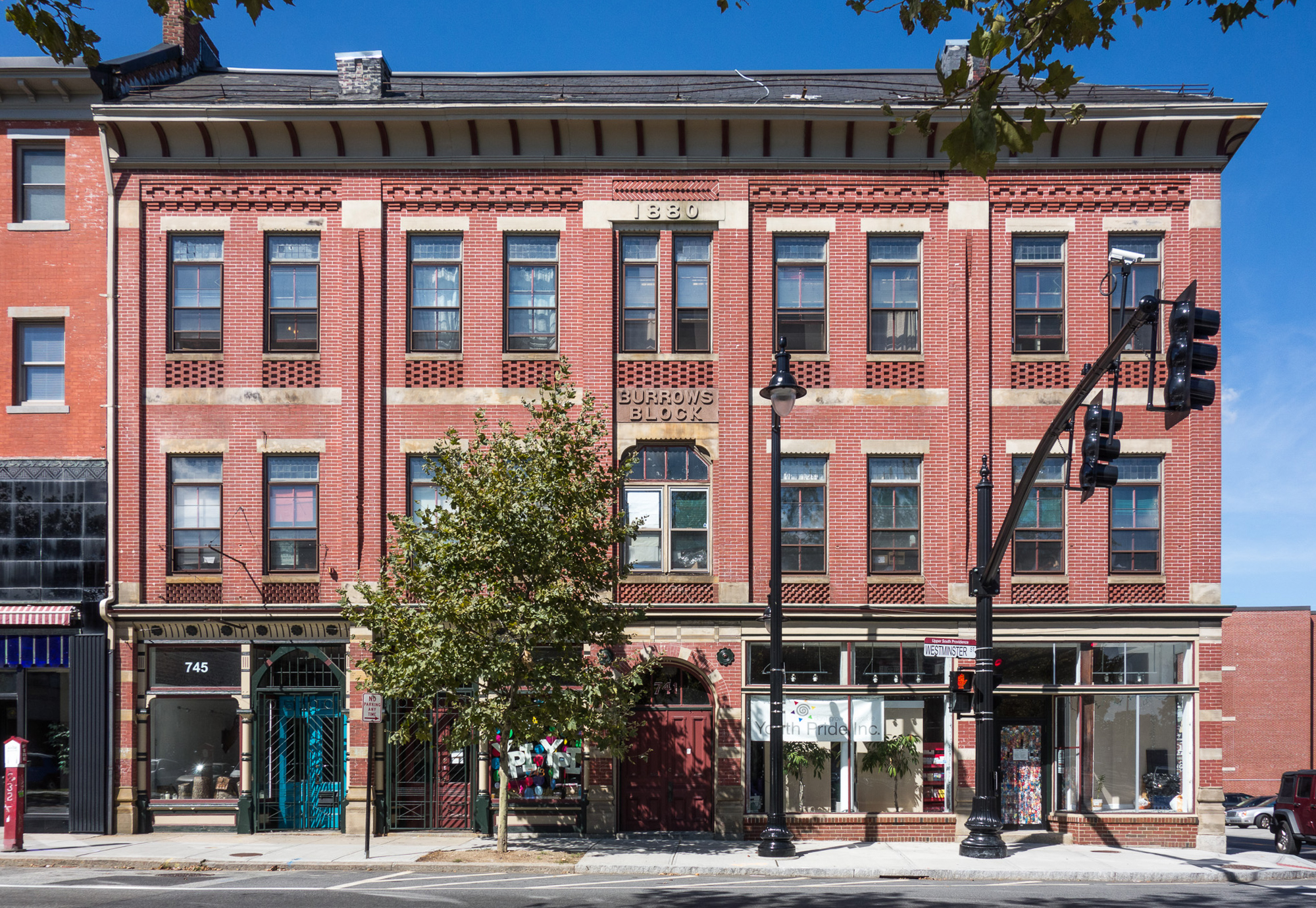
Burrows Block, Providence, 1880.

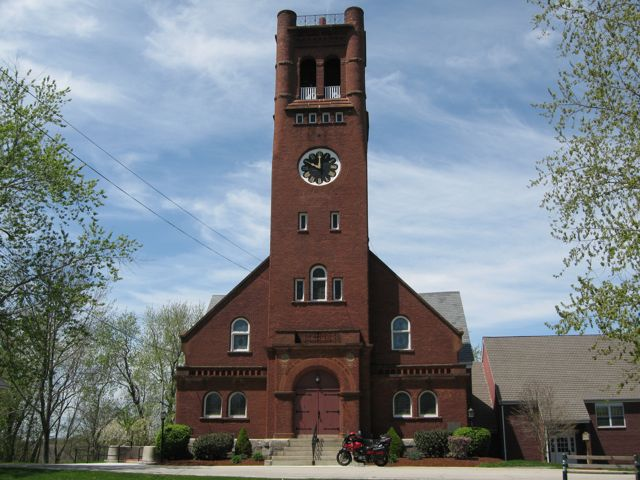
Conant Memorial Church, Dudley, 1890.

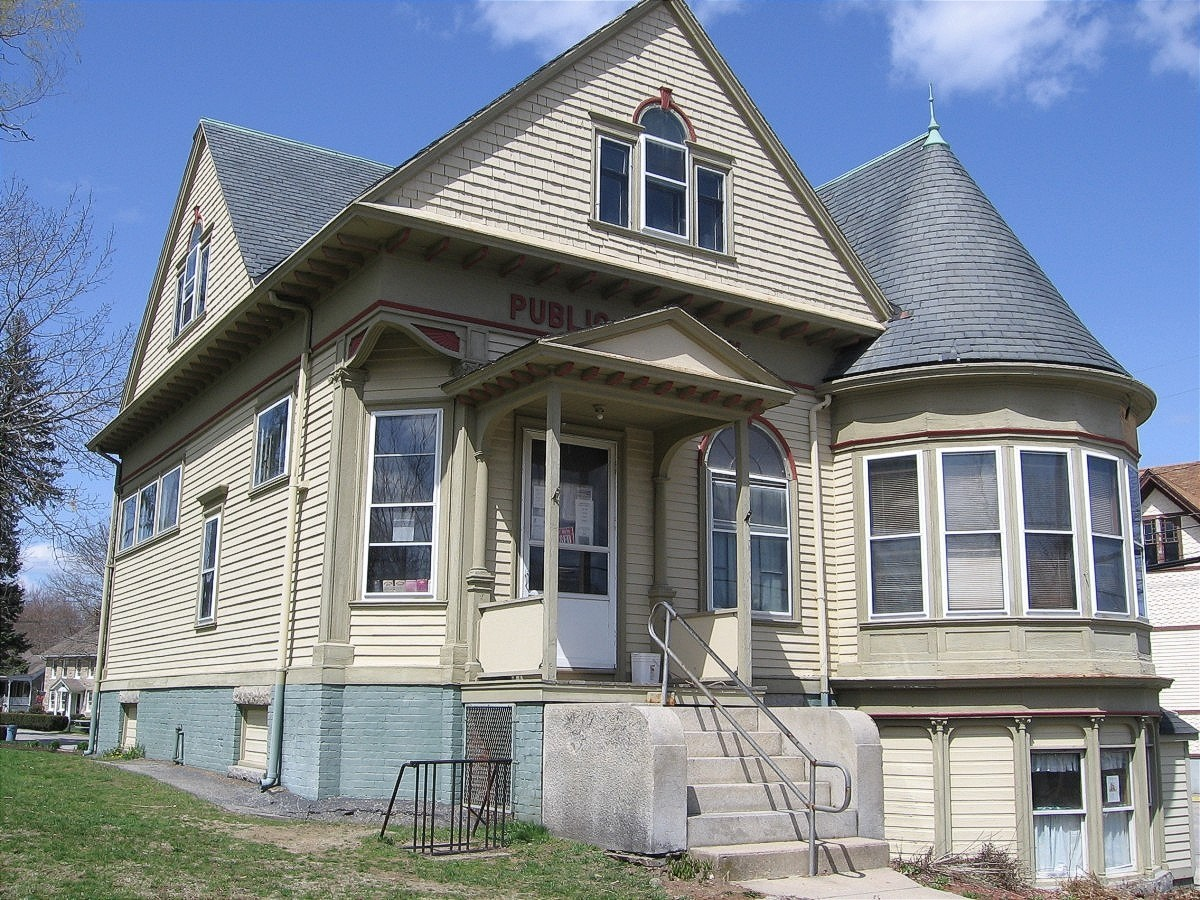
Aldrich Free Public Library, Moosup, 1894.

Charles F. Wilcox (1845–1905) was an American architect practicing in Providence, Rhode Island.

== Life ==
Wilcox was born in 1845 in Georgia, to a family that relocated to Providence in his infancy. He trained with local architect Charles P. Hartshorn, becoming his partner in 1873. Their firm, Hartshorn & Wilcox, lasted until the end of 1879, briefly before Hartshorn's death in 1880. Wilcox continued practicing alone until 1895, when he made draftsman Gideon Gardner Congdon partner in Wilcox & Congdon. This firm was dissolved in 1899 and Wilcox again continued alone. He died in Providence in 1905.

== Architectural works ==
=== Hartshorn & Wilcox, 1873-1879 ===
- 1874 - Congdon Street Baptist Church, 15 Congdon St, Providence, Rhode Island
- 1874 - Wayland Building, 128 N Main St, Providence, Rhode Island
  - Also home to the offices of church architect James Murphy
- 1875 - Fourth Baptist Church (Remodeling), Howell St, Providence, Rhode Island
  - Demolished
- 1876 - Union Baptist Church, 10 East St, Providence, Rhode Island
  - Commissioned by the Third Baptist Church
- 1877 - Charles Ackerman Duplex, 61-63 Chapin Ave, Providence, Rhode Island

=== C. F. Wilcox, 1880-1895 ===
- 1880 - Burrows Block, 741 Westminster St, Providence, Rhode Island
- 1883 - First Baptist Church, 30 Peirce St, East Greenwich, Rhode Island
- 1883 - South Baptist Church, 185-187 Ocean St, Providence, Rhode Island
  - Demolished
- 1884 - Charles Matteson House, 112 Prospect St, Providence, Rhode Island
- 1886 - Cyrus E. Lapham House, 64 Harrison St, Pawtucket, Rhode Island
- 1890 - Conant Memorial Church, 135 Center Rd, Dudley, Massachusetts
- 1893 - Dudley Hill School, Center Rd, Dudley, Massachusetts
  - Now owned by Nichols College
- 1895 - Aldrich Free Public Library, 299 Main St, Moosup, Connecticut

=== Wilcox & Congdon, 1895-1899 ===
- 1896 - George M. Snow House, 24 Alumni Ave, Providence, Rhode Island

=== C. F. Wilcox, 1899-1905 ===
- 1902 - Narragansett Baptist Church (Old), 20 Ferry Rd, Saunderstown, Rhode Island
  - Now serves as the local post office
