= Charles P. Hartshorn =

American architect

Charles Payton Hartshorn
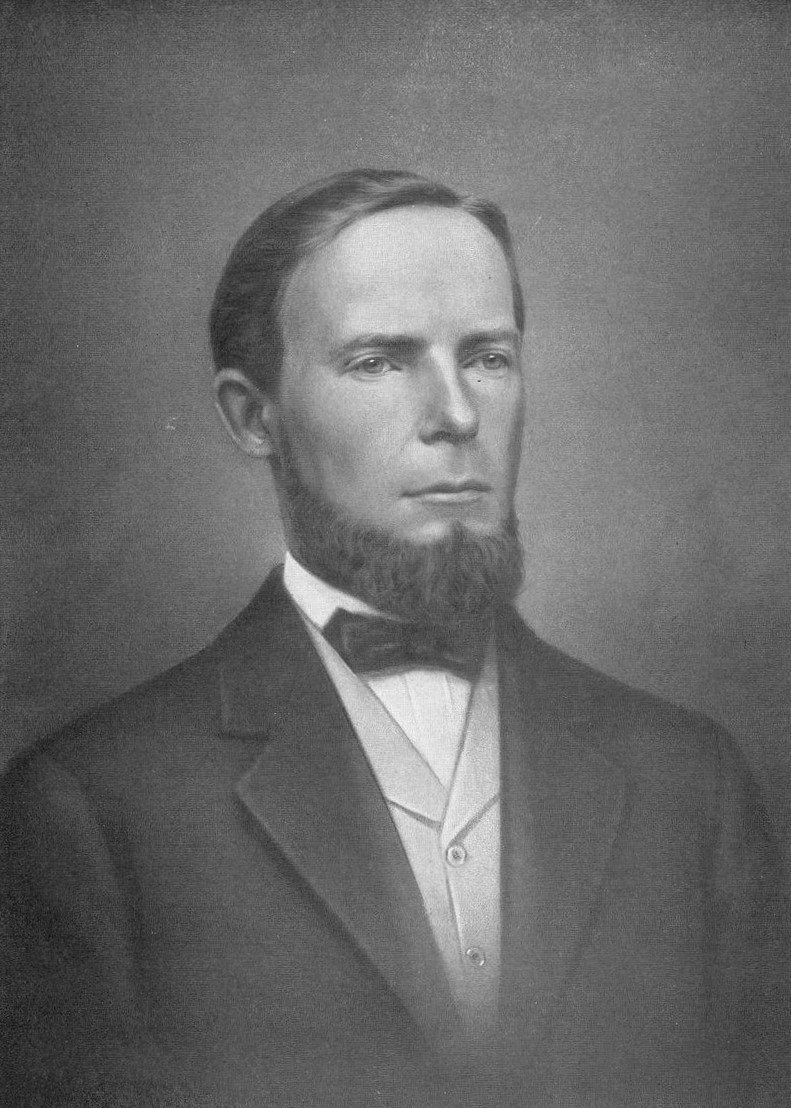
- Born: July 31, 1833; Norfolk, Virginia
- Died: August 13, 1880 (aged 47); Providence, Rhode Island
- Occupation: Architect

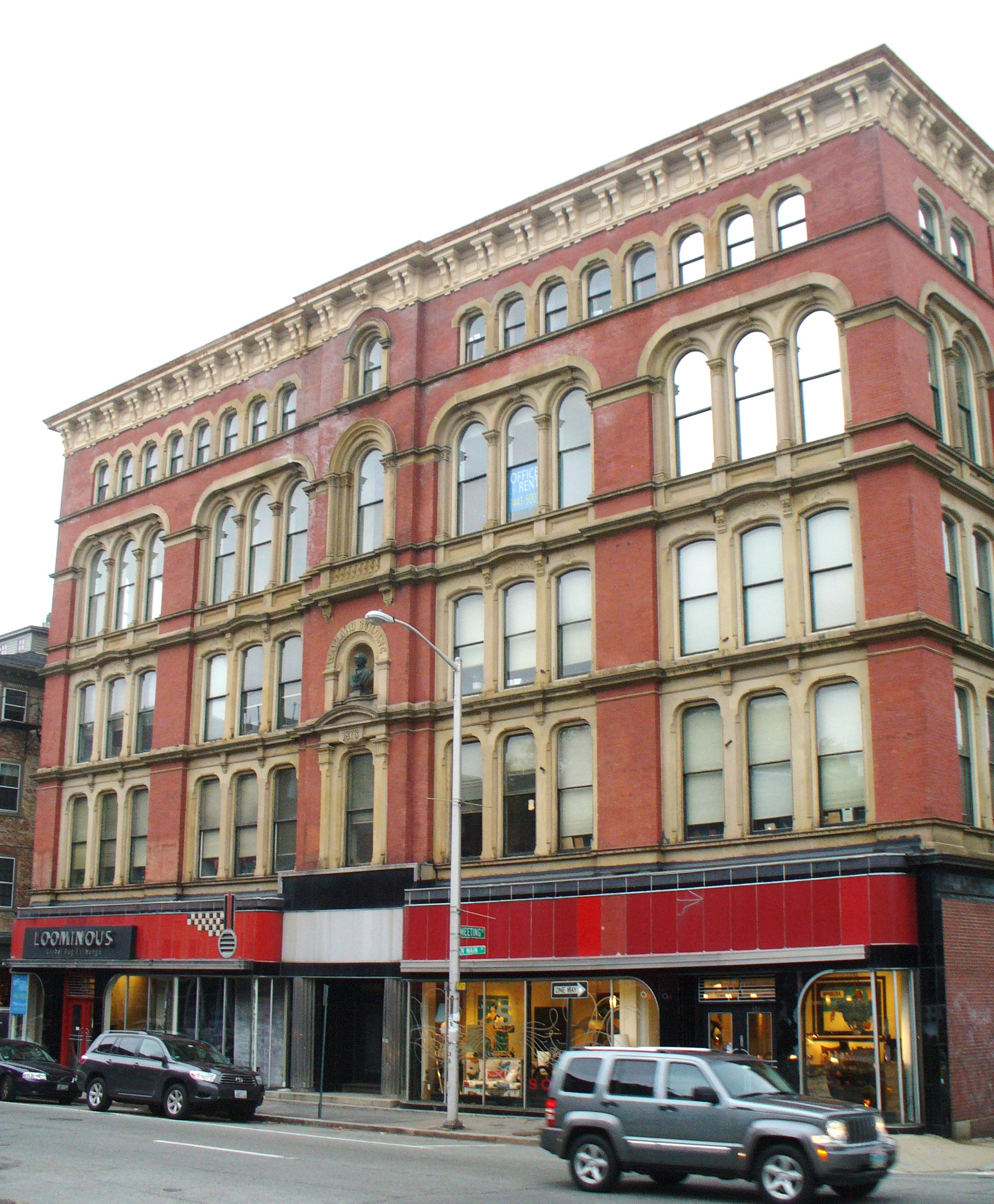
The Wayland Building in Providence, Rhode Island, designed by Hartshorn and built in 1874.

Charles P. Hartshorn FAIA (1833 – 1880) was an American architect practicing in Providence, Rhode Island. He was a popular designer there in the decade immediately following the Civil War.

== Life and career ==
Charles Payton Hartshorn was born July 31, 1833, in Norfolk, Virginia, to Samuel Weldt Hartshorn and Amelia Payton (Dana) Hartshorn, both natives of Providence. His parents returned to Providence when he was young, and he was educated in the Providence public schools. At a young age he decided to pursue architecture as a profession, and as a teenager entered the office of Tallman & Bucklin, then Providence's leading architects. When the firm's chief designer, Thomas A. Tefft, left to open his own office in 1851, Hartshorn went with him. Hartshorn was Tefft's primary assistant until Tefft left for a Grand Tour of Europe in 1856 and managed the office in his absence, anticipating his return. Tefft died unexpectedly in Florence in 1859, after which Hartshorn practiced under his own name.

Hartshorn practiced alone until about c. 1873, when he formed a partnership with Charles F. Wilcox. The resulting firm of Hartshorn & Wilcox lasted until his death, though works designed during this time are frequently assigned to one architect or the other.

Hartshorn joined the American Institute of Architects in 1875 as a Fellow, and was one of the founding members of the Rhode Island chapter the same year. He was chapter secretary until his death.

== Personal life ==
In 1865 he was married to Helen Almira Snow of Providence, and they had one daughter, Stella Josephine. He died August 13, 1880, followed by his wife on March 11, 1897.

Hartshorn was a Unitarian and a long-time member of the First Unitarian Church of Providence.

== Legacy ==
At least one of Hartshorn's works, designed in association with Wilcox, has been listed on the United States National Register of Historic Places. Others contribute to listed historic districts.

At least two Providence architects trained in Hartshorn's office: Wilmarth H. Colwell, who later formed a partnership with Thomas J. Gould, and Edward L. Angell, in practice in New York City after 1883.

== Architectural works ==
- Teste Block, (Note: A contributing property to the Downtown Providence Historic District, listed on the National Register of Historic Places in 1985.) 88 Dorance St, Providence, Rhode Island (1860)
- Providence Home for Aged Women (former), (Note: A contributing property to the College Hill Historic District, listed on the National Register of Historic Places in 1970.) 75 East St, Providence, Rhode Island (1863–64)
- Ray Hall, Butler Hospital, Providence, Rhode Island (1864)
- Houses for Henry B. Gladding and Royal P. Gladding, (Note: A contributing property to the Broadway–Armory Historic District, listed on the National Register of Historic Places in 1974.) 258 and 260 Broadway, Providence, Rhode Island (1867–68)
- House for George T. Mitchell, 7 Barnes St, Providence, Rhode Island (1867–69)
- House for George B. Calder, 408-410 Broadway, Providence, Rhode Island (1868)
- Olney Street Congregational (Unitarian) Church, (Note: Occupied from 1901 until its demolition in 1959 by the Olney Street Baptist Church, a prominent local Black congregation.) 30 Olney St, Providence, Rhode Island (1870, demolished 1959)
- House for Joseph Davol, (Note: A contributing property to the Parkis–Comstock Historic District, listed on the National Register of Historic Places in 1980.) 48 Parkis Ave, Providence, Rhode Island (1872)
- Congdon Street Baptist Church, 15 Congdon St, Providence, Rhode Island (1874, NRHP 1971)
- Wayland Building, 128 N Main St, Providence, Rhode Island (1874)
- Fourth Baptist Church remodeling, Howell St, Providence, Rhode Island (1875, demolished)
- Union Baptist Church, 10 East St, Providence, Rhode Island (1876)
- House for Charles Ackerman, 61-63 Chapin Ave, Providence, Rhode Island (1877)

== Gallery of works ==
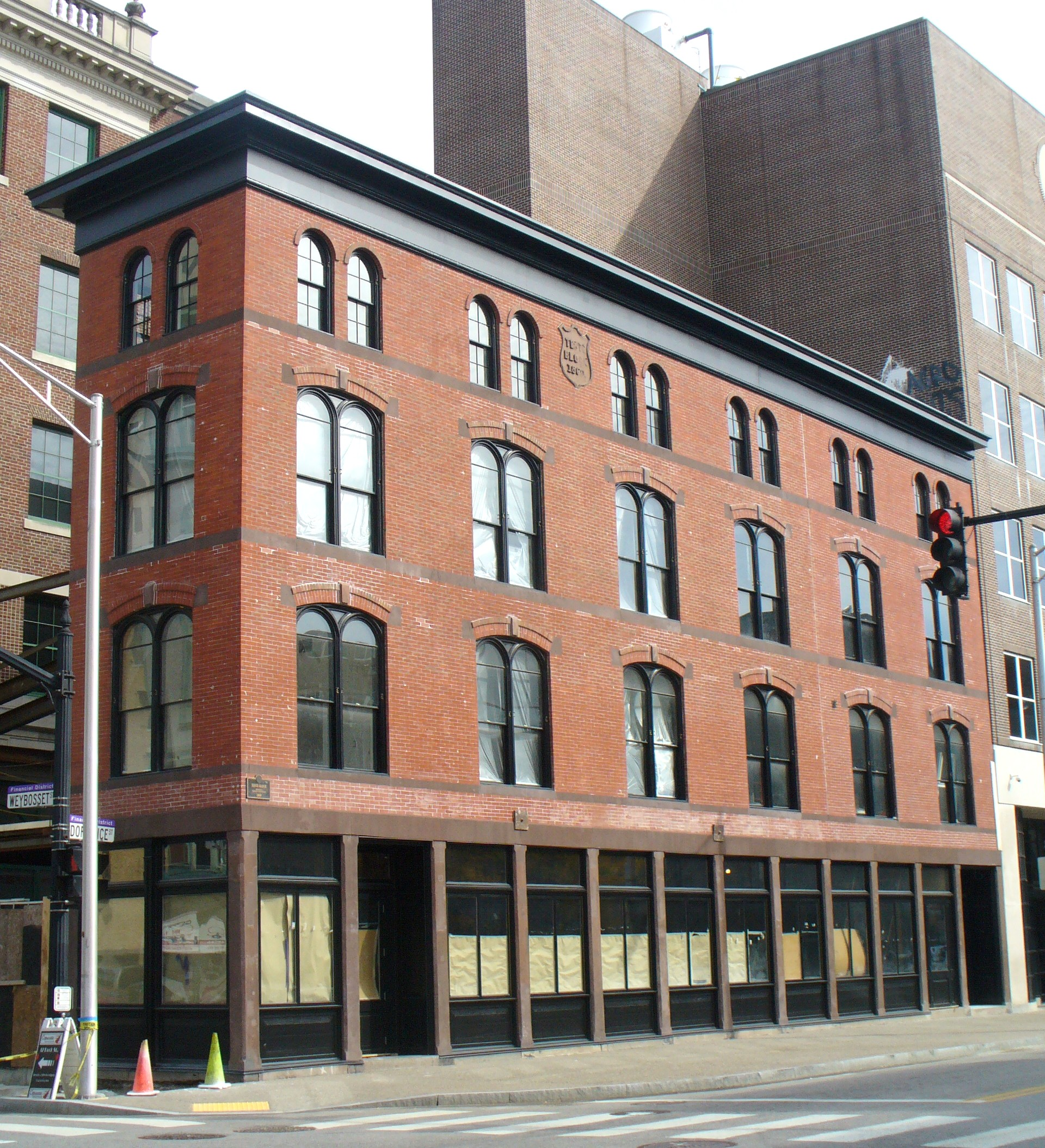
Teste Block, Providence, Rhode Island, 1860.

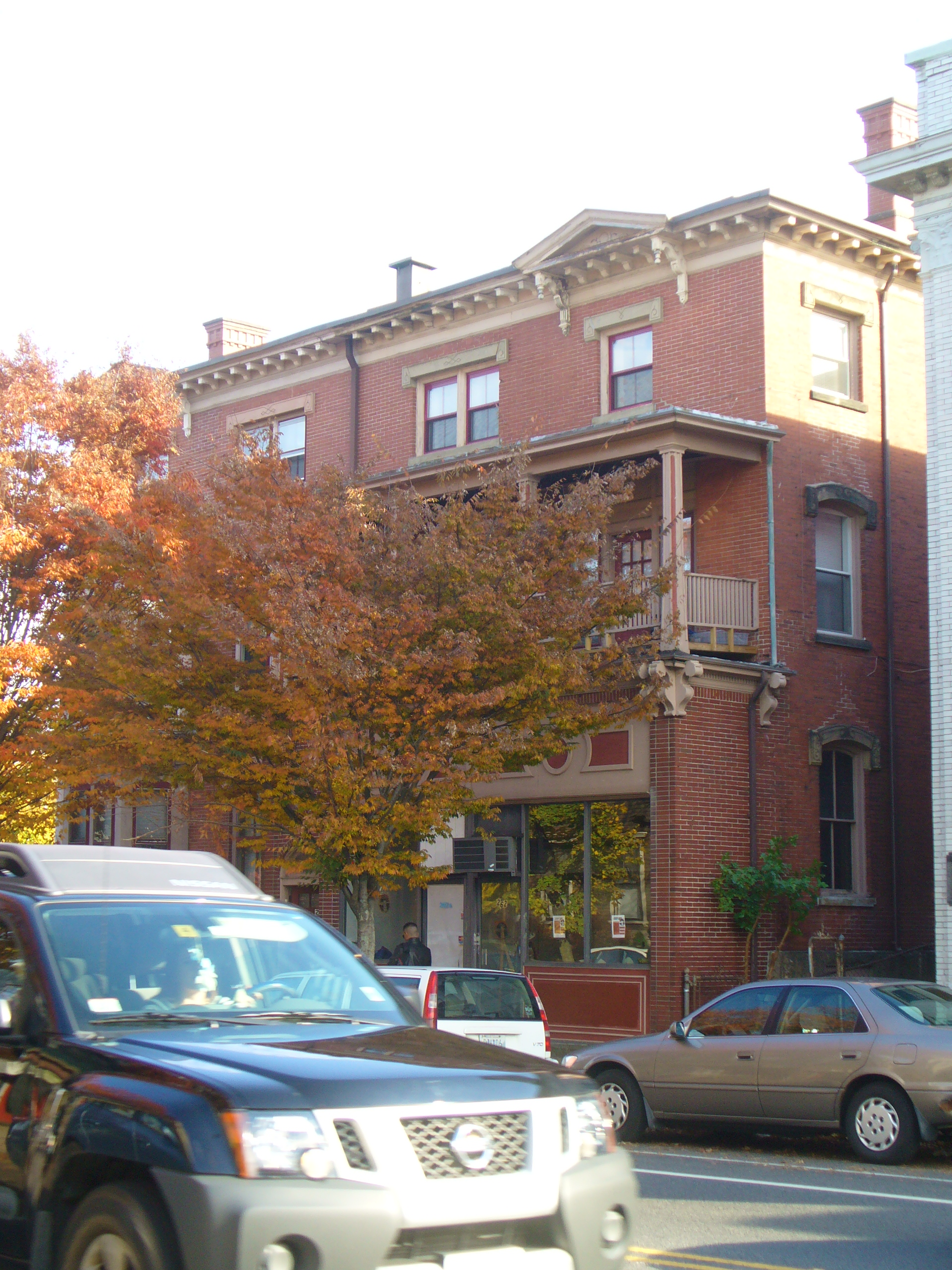
Houses for Henry B. Gladding and Royal P. Gladding, Providence, Rhode Island, 1867-68.

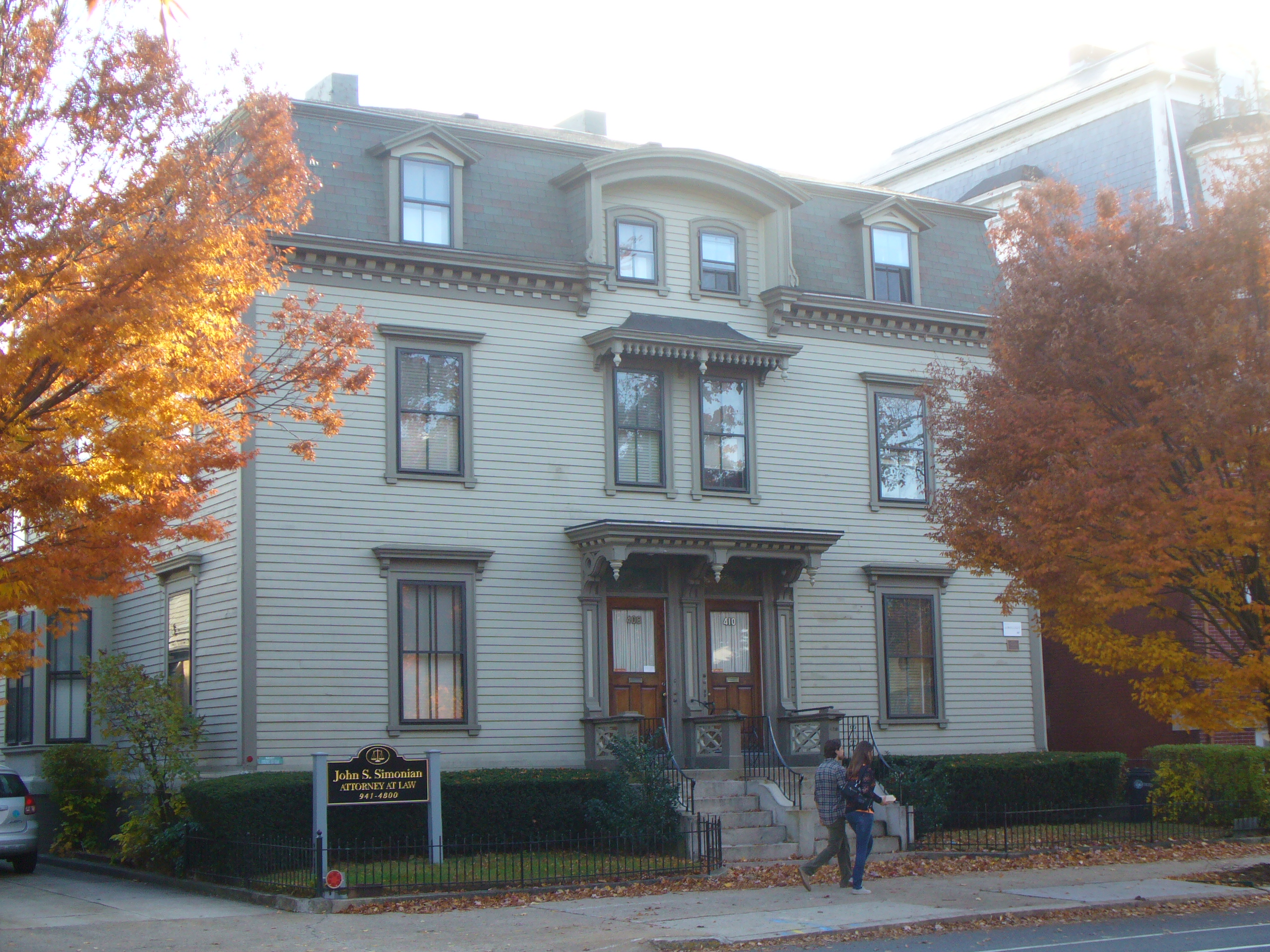
House for George B. Calder, Providence, Rhode Island, 1868.

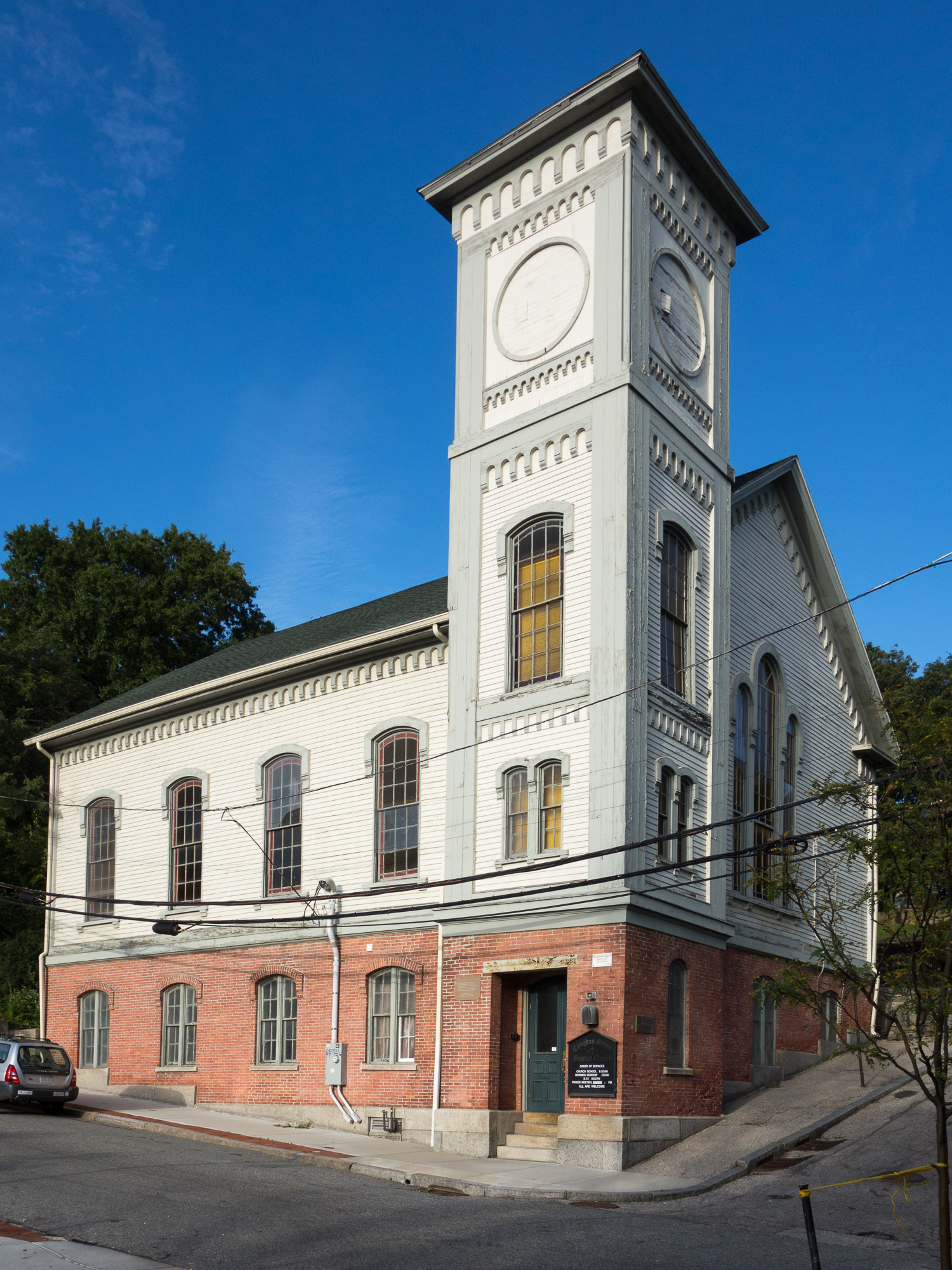
Congdon Street Baptist Church, Providence, Rhode Island, 1874.
