= Grove Street =

Grove Street may refer to:

- Grove Street (Camden County, New Jersey)
- Grove Street (Hudson County, New Jersey)
- Grove Street Cemetery
- Grove Street Elementary School
- "Grove St. Party", a 2011 song by Waka Flocka Flame
- Magpie Lane, Oxford, a lane in England's historic university town of Oxford; known as "Grove Street" from the late 19th century until the late 1920s
- A historic street in New York City's West Village, part of the larger Greenwich Village
- A fictional street and neighborhood in Los Santos (Grand Theft Auto) in the Grand Theft Auto video game series

== See also ==
- Grove Street station (disambiguation)
