= Aldrich Free Public Library =

- U.S. National Register of Historic Places
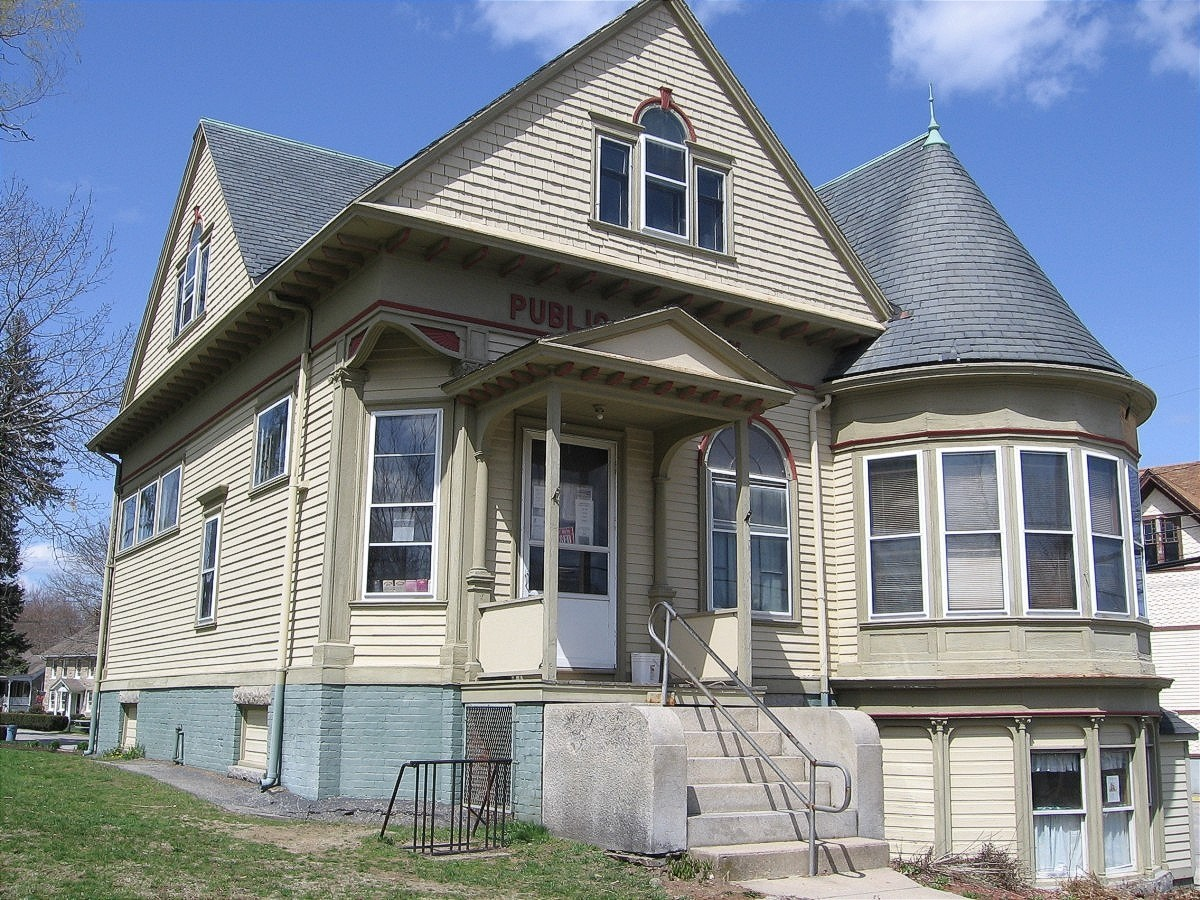
- Location: 299 Main Street, Plainfield, Connecticut
- Coordinates: 41°43′8″N 71°52′32″W
- Area: 0.3 acres (0.12 ha)
- Built: 1895
- Architect: Charles F. Wilcox
- Architectural style: Queen Anne
- NRHP reference No.: 94000768
- Added to NRHP: July 27, 1994

Aldrich Free Public Library is the public library of the Moosup section of Plainfield, Connecticut. It is located at 299 Main Street, in an architecturally significant Queen Anne building constructed in 1895 with funds given by the library's major benefactors, David L. Aldrich and Edwin Milner. The building was listed on the National Register of Historic Places in 1994.

== Architecture and history ==
The Aldrich Free Public Library stands in the village center of Moosup, at the northwest corner of Main and High Streets. It is a 1 1/2-story wood-frame structure, with a slate roof and exterior finished mostly in wooden clapboards. It has an asymmetrical plan, with a cross-gabled roof configuration that includes side gables, a front gable over the entrance, and a turret-like rounded projecting to its right. The gable ends are finished in wooden shingles, with keystoned Palladian windows at their centers. The rounded turret-like roof end is crowned by a finial, with a band of sash windows below. The interior retains many original features, include oak bookcases, furnitures, flooring, and trim.

The library was built in 1895 to a design by Charles F. Wilcox of Providence, Rhode Island, and is a prominent local example of Queen Anne Victorian architecture. It was funded in part by a bequest of David Aldrich, a local mill owner, and his business partner, Edwin Milner. Aldrich died in 1889, and the remainder of the library's cost was covered by fundraising within the community. Milner donated the land on which it stands, and covered enough of the building construction cost so that the locally raised funds could be used for books and furnishings.

== See also ==
- National Register of Historic Places listings in Windham County, Connecticut
