= Grove Street station =

Grove Street station may refer to:

- Grove Street station (NJ Transit), a former railway station in East Orange, New Jersey
- Grove Street station (Newark Light Rail), a light rail station in Bloomfield, New Jersey
- Grove Street station (PATH), a rapid transit station in Jersey City, New Jersey

== See also ==
- Grove Street (disambiguation)
