= Edward L. Angell =

American architect

Edward Lewis Angell
- Born: March 11, 1847; Providence, Rhode Island
- Died: October 1, 1923 (aged 76); Jersey City, New Jersey
- Occupation: Architect

Edward L. Angell (1847 – 1923) was an American architect who worked in Providence, Rhode Island, and New York City.

== Life and career ==
Edward Lewis Angell was born March 11, 1847, in Providence, Rhode Island, to Tristram Harris Angell and Caroline Mason (Lewis) Angell. He was educated by private tutors and in architecture in the office of Charles P. Hartshorn. In 1874 he was appointed advisory architect to the committee that had charge of the design and construction of the new Providence City Hall. Following a competition, Angell, along with architect Alpheus C. Morse and builder David Childs, recommended the design of Samuel J. F. Thayer, which was built. Over the next few years Angell designed several schools in Providence and the Grove Street Elementary School in Woonsocket. In 1878 City Hall was finished, and Angell went west, working for a number of architects on public buildings in the Midwest. In 1883 he returned east and established a practice in New York City, where he would remain for the rest of his career.

He worked in various popular styles during his career. He designed Queen Anne, Romanesque, neo-Grec and Renaissance Revival works, mainly in Greenwich Village and on the Upper West Side. His earliest known commissions were 44 and 46 West 85th Street (1886–87) 241-49 Central Park West (1887–88, altered), 170 West 75th Street (1888–89), 340-48 West End Avenue, 262-68 West 77th Street (both 1889-90), and the Endicott Hotel (1890–91), at Columbus Avenue and 82nd Street. All are extant and located in historic districts on the Upper West Side.

He designed a row of 11 Queen Anne and Romanesque Revival row houses from 101 to 121 Manhattan Ave (between West 104th and West 105th) for Joseph Turner. Construction of the row commenced in August 1889, and was completed in May 1890, at a recorded cost of $10,000 per house. These homes are in the Manhattan Avenue Historic District.

He died of diabetes October 1, 1923, in Jersey City, New Jersey.
