= Burrows Block =

- U.S. National Register of Historic Places
- U.S. Historic district – Contributing property
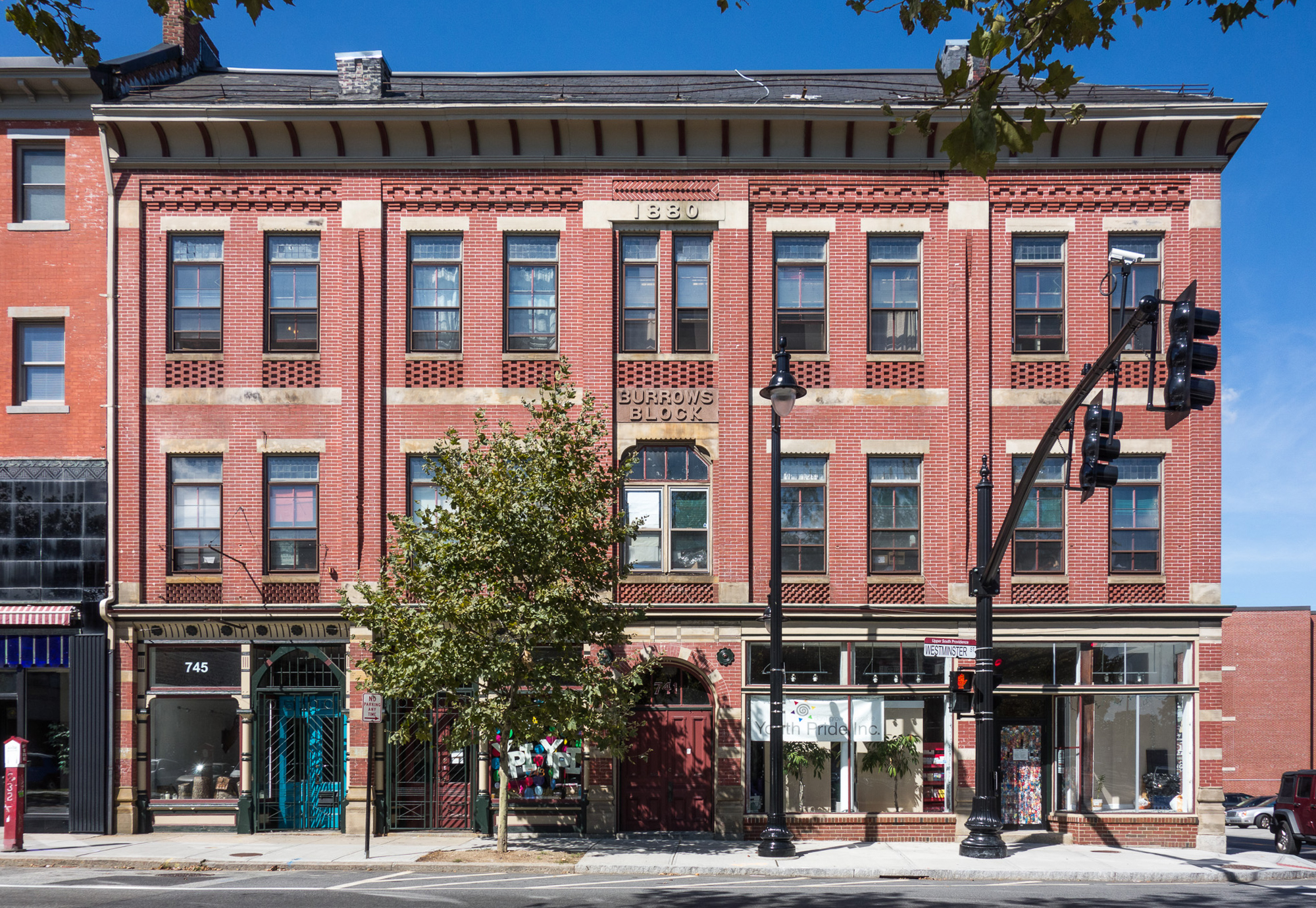

- Location within Rhode Island Location within the United States
- Location: Providence, Rhode Island
- Coordinates: 41°49′5″N 71°25′15″W
- Built: 1880
- Architect: Charles F. Wilcox
- Architectural style: Gothic
- Part of: Westminster Street Historic District (ID03000494)
- NRHP reference No.: 90001347

Significant dates
- Added to NRHP: September 5, 1990
- Designated CP: May 30, 2003

The Burrows Block is an historic commercial building at 735-745 Westminster Street in Providence, Rhode Island. It is a three-story brick building with Gothic Revival styling. It was built in 1880 by Caleb Burrows to provide office space for his hardware business, with retail spaces on the ground floor. Although the hardware business declined in the 20th century, the building has seen a variety of commercial and retail tenants, and was purchased by the city in 2002.

It was designed by local architect Charles F. Wilcox.

The building was listed on the National Register of Historic Places in 1990, and is located near the center of the Westminster Street Historic District, listed in 2003.

== See also ==
- National Register of Historic Places listings in Providence, Rhode Island
