= Endicott Hotel =

Luxury hotel in Manhattan, New York

The Endicott
- Interactive map of the The Endicott area

General information
- Location: 101 West 81st Street
- Coordinates: 40°47′1.5″N 73°58′28.5″W
- Construction started: 1889
- Opened: 1890
- Renovated: 1981

Technical details
- Floor count: 7

Design and construction
- Architect: Edward Angell

Other information
- Number of units: 144
- Public transit access: Subway: 81st Street–Museum of Natural History station Bus: M7, M11, M79

The Endicott Hotel is a former luxury hotel which now serves as a co-op. The building sits between 81st and 82nd St. on Columbus Avenue on the Upper West Side of Manhattan in New York City, diagonal from the American Museum of Natural History.

== Development ==
The original hotel was built by Charles A. Fuller and designed by Edward Angell, who also designed several other prominent buildings on the Upper West Side. The hotel was originally intended to be an Apartment house, the Endicott. The original plans filed in April 1889 called for two buildings, each with 44 families and seven stories high. But the initial plans were not approved by the Building Department. After several changes to the plans, the Endicott began construction in 1889 at a cost of over $1,500,000. The first building, opening on 81st Street for 52 families was finished in 1890; the second building on 82nd Street for 72 families opened in 1891.

When the hotel opened, it was described as "in all respects, the finest and best appointed in this part of the city." The hotel was built of Roman brick and terra cotta and boasted many modern marvels of its day including steam heat, lighting by its own electric plant, and good ventilation. The original decor was elaborate, sporting marble tile and onyx wainscoting.

The original hotel included a glass-roofed Palm Room where today in its place is the restaurant The Milling Room. There was a dining room on the second floor which could seat upwards of 500 to 600 people, as well as a cafe, barber shop and newsstand on the ground floor.

Outside, the platforms of the Ninth Avenue El's 81st Street station ran by the hotel's third floor windows.

== Hotel operation ==
=== 1890s ===
From its earliest days, the hotel often played host to meetings of the elite of society and often served as the meeting place for the city's Republican Party. The cost of a suite at that time was $65 a month or upward furnished, or $50 a month unfurnished.

The hotel also faced issues with race relations early on. In 1893, soon after opening, the hotel's chambermaids and pantry girls threatened a strike when a non-union "colored waiter" took the place of a union striker. The manager made an agreement with the strikers to pay them $32 a month and discharge the non-union (colored) waiter.

In 1897, there was an explosion at the hotel when Charles E. Tripler, a chemist and inventor, was exhibiting a "secret fluid compound" made of nitrogen and oxygen to some friends. Tripler poured the liquid on bread, whiskey and pure alcohol, freezing them. One of the spectators touched a lighted match to the alcohol, shattering the glass and injuring several onlookers.

The hotel seemed to run into hard financial times almost from the beginning. The Hotel Endicott changed hands several times during the period, from Charles Fuller to Cyrus C. Marble and Benjamin Gates to Cyrus Marble and Isaac Anstatt.

=== 1900s ===
Throughout the 1900s, the hotel was frequently mentioned in the society pages. By then, according to an article in the Brooklyn Eagle, a room at the Endicott cost $3 on the American plan (including room and meals) and $1 for the European plan (room only).

The hotel was home to several disasters and scandals during the first decade of the century. In 1900, the hotel was the site of a grisly murder when Mrs. Mary Hayes was shot in the left temple by Dr. Franklin Caldwell, who then shot himself. Dr. Caldwell was an assistant to Mrs. Hayes' husband, Dr. E.P. Hayes, a dentist at the Siegel Cooper Company. Caldwell allegedly had an infatuation with his employer's wife.

The year 1904 was particularly tough for the hotel. In May, a "mentally unbalanced" forty-year-old woman dropped from one of the hotel's sixth story rooms and died shortly afterward. A month later, a former state senator was assaulted in the lobby of the hotel. Then in September, Don Carlos Frederico von Bauditz, the 26-year-old head of a wealthy Venezuelan family, shot himself in the head after a shattered romance.

In 1909, the hotel witnessed one of the stranger events in its storied history. One of the chambermaids of the hotel had fallen in love with the superintendent of a nearby building on W. 83rd St. According to the Joseph Freal, the object of her affections, he had avoided the woman who appeared to be stalking him. Out of desperation, the chambermaid showed up to his apartment, drank carbolic acid, then knocked on the door of Freal's apartment. She died soon after.

There were two major fires in the Endicott during the 1900s. In 1902, a fire broke out in the hotel when chemicals used by a chamber maid blazed up in some unexplained manner and set fire to the hangings. Then in 1905, another fire broke out due to a faulty flue in the kitchen. The fire ate its way through the flooring of the second floor dining room.

The hotel continued to change hands throughout the period. In 1901, the Hotel Endicott property, was sold by Isaac Anstatt and Cyrus C. Marble to the Hotel Endicott Company for $499,500 plus the assumption of all liens on the property.

=== 1910s and 1920s ===
From 1910 to 1929, the Endicott continued to play an important role in the social life of New York. It was the site of several major society weddings and hosted several political and scientific conferences over the years.

But the property's financial misfortunes continued. In late 1911, the executors of the Marshall O. Roberts estate brought suit against the hotels owners, who at the time included John D Rockefeller, to secure two mortgages made to Charles Fuller for $650,000. In August, after considerable legislation, the property was sold under foreclosure and transferred to the trustees of the estate, for an expressed consideration of $750,000. Later in October that year, the property was leased by the trustees for $1 million for 21 years to William and J. Manger, bankers of 10 Wall Street, who at the time also owned the Plaza Hotel in Chicago.

=== Depression and decline ===
When the depression hit in 1929, the neighborhood began to spiral downward and the hotel gradually fell into disrepair. In 1932, the building was auctioned to Diederich A. Christoffers, on a bid of $10,000 above a mortgage of $500,000.

Throughout the 1930s, the building became a center for organized crime. The infamous gangster Dutch Schultz maintained a residence in the building. It also likely served as the headquarters for the Moe and Shim Syndicate, an alleged liquor ring during the age of prohibition that distributed more than 650,000 gallons of alcohol.

By the late 1940s and 1950s, the hotel had gone downhill. According to one mafia drug pusher, "Uncle Sonny," it was a venue where he could fill his packets with money from addicts, "some rich and famous, and some down and out losers who apparently had money." According to Sonny, jazz singer Billie Holiday had a room there and by then had become a hardened heroin user.

In 1951, the hotel was leased by Milner Hotels, owner of the Eagle Hotels chain. It was to be completely remodeled and renamed the New Endicott Hotel. Yet the hotel continued its decline.

By the 1960s, the hotel had been branded one of the worst welfare hotels in the city. A person could get a room there for $3 a night or, as most of its residents did, from $13.95 a week. Described by one neighbor as "a scene from Calcutta," scores of desperate people could be seen drinking, fighting, and screaming with prostitutes roaming up and down the metal stairways selling themselves. In 1964, a 33-year-old man was arrested for shooting off a rifle on the roof of the hotel.

By the early 1970s, the Endicott had become very dangerous. At the time, about 40–50% of its tenants were receiving welfare. Management tried to evict "undesirable elements" from the premises but was unsuccessful. A violent crime wave struck the building. In 1972, there was a slaying of four women in the hotel. In 1973, a 63-year-old welfare recipient was found murdered and the body set afire. Then in 1974, a man was stabbed to death in the elevator.

The sole highlight was that it played host to the American rock band, the New York Dolls' first public performance around Christmastime 1971. Workers at the hotel were organizing a party for the residents; they heard the Dolls jamming across the street and asked if they'd play in exchange for free food.

== Gentrification and conversion to co-ops ==
By the late 1970s, the neighborhood had begun to recover and gentrification hit several upper west side buildings including the Endicott Hotel. In 1979, Robert Quinlan embarked on an $8.2 million project to convert the Endicott hotel into Museum Park Apartments, featuring 146 co-op apartments and several commercial condominiums. Stephen B. Jacobs, who led several other condominium conversion projects at the time, was the architect for the ambitious project. The 144 apartments were put on the market in March 1981. They had nearly all sold by June, at prices ranging from $67,000 to $205,000. Peter Salwen in his book Upper West Side Story wrote that "By 1983, even the Endicott Hotel had been emptied, fumigated and converted to expensive co-ops."

The newly revived building included ground floor shops with wood facades including the Penny Whistle Toys Shop, Salou (a custom florist), and Endicott Book Sellers. In November 1982, movie mogul Dino De Laurentiis turned the restored Palm Court into DDL Foodshow, a specialty food shop. On a 34-foot marble counter, De Laurentiis served countless varieties of cheeses, breads, salads, even a suckling pig or two. By April 1984, DDL Foodshow had succumbed, along with many neighbors, to what the Times then called "one of the biggest retailing busts in recent memory." After several other unsuccessful attempts, the space became what is now the Milling Room, with Executive Chef Scott Bryan (formerly of Veritas). Olde Good Things, New York City's architectural salvage company, had a shop in this building from about 2010 to 2014.

== See also ==
- List of former hotels in Manhattan
