= Mill Ridge Manor =

Human settlement in Connecticut, United States of America

Coordinates: 41.72°N 71.9042°W

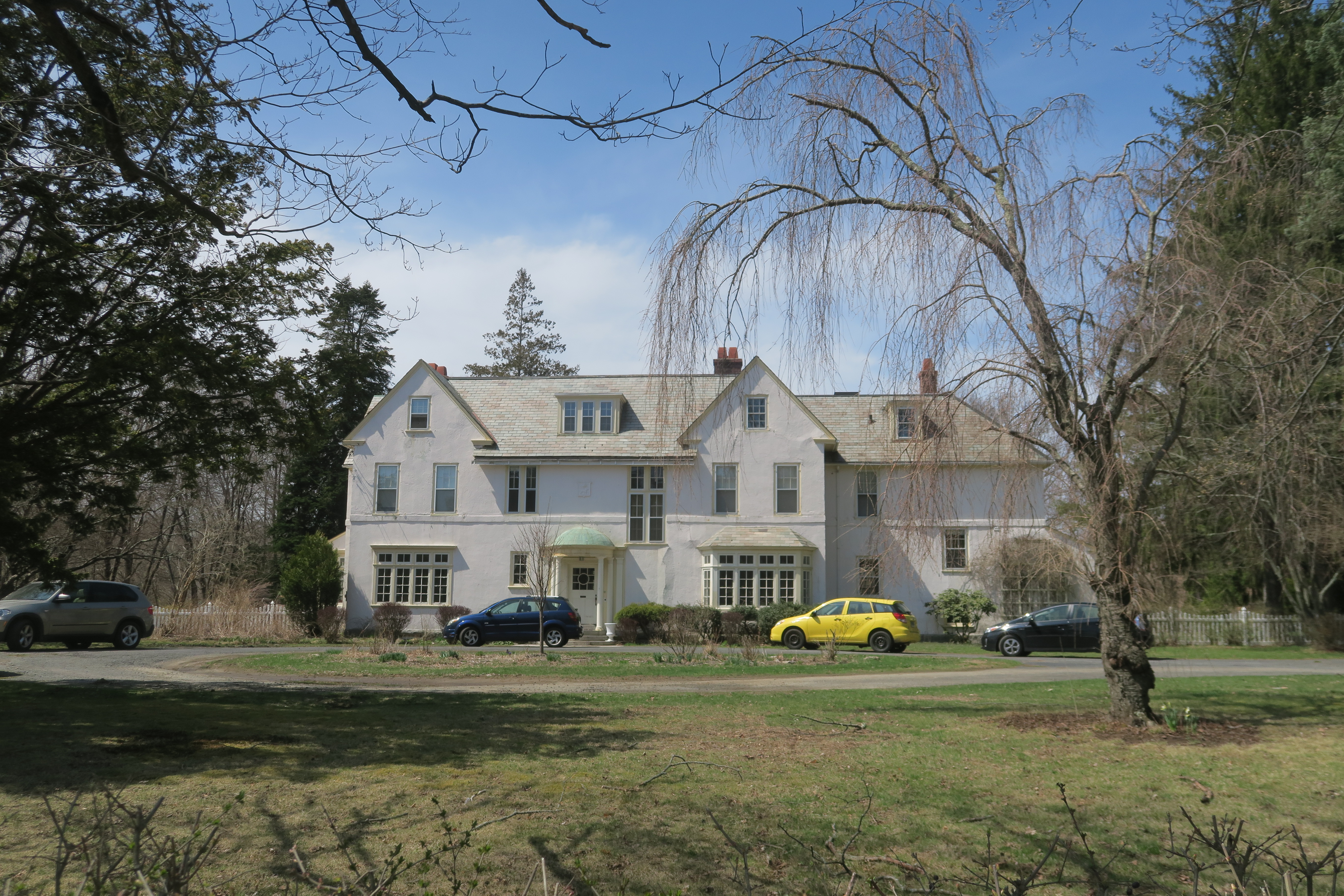
Mill Ridge Manor

The Millridge Manor is a historic 22-room mansion located at Moosup, Connecticut that has recently been renovated and restored to its former 1920s appearance. The mansion was built in 1880 for textile mogul and financier Floyd Cranska and rebuilt and remodeled to a French Chateau by his son Lucius B. Cranska in 1927. The Millrige Manor is now operated as an elegant Wedding and event venue. Hosting many events in the historic gardens.

== Notes ==
Millridge Manor is on the State of Connecticut register of historic places.

The home displays period architecture of the Victorian and the Jazz Age.

Some of the plantings in the garden are over a century old.
