= Parkis–Comstock Historic District =

Historic district in Rhode Island, United States

- U.S. National Register of Historic Places
- U.S. Historic district
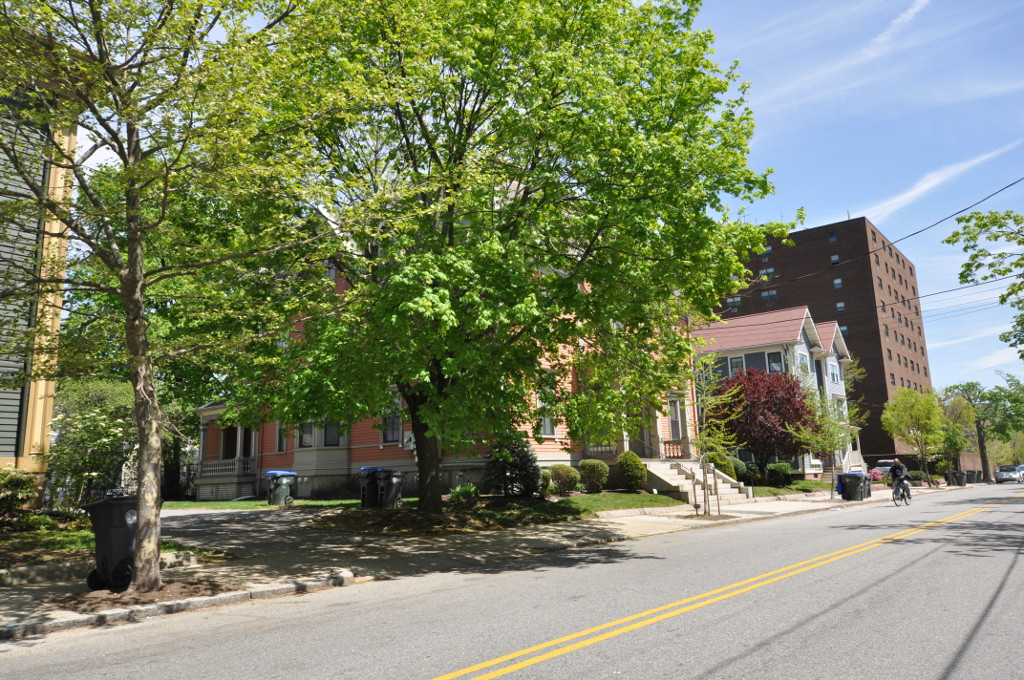

- Location within Rhode Island Location within the United States
- Location: Providence, Rhode Island
- Coordinates: 41°48′33″N 71°25′15″W
- Area: 10 acres (4.0 ha)
- Architectural style: Late 19th and 20th Century Revivals, Late Victorian
- MPS: Elmwood MRA
- NRHP reference No.: 80000005 (original); 88000512 (increase)

Significant dates
- Added to NRHP: January 7, 1980
- Boundary increase: May 5, 1988

The Parkis–Comstock Historic District is a residential historic district in the Elmwood neighborhood of Providence, Rhode Island. It includes all of the properties on Parkis Avenue and a number of properties on the western end of Comstock Street and Harvard Avenue, just across Broad Street from Parkis. The houses are set on relatively uniform large lots, generally set close to the street, and represent a fine collection of Late Victorian upper-class housing. Most of the houses were built between the 1860s and the 1910s. The first house to be built on Parkis Avenue was the c. 1869 Louis Comstock House at number 47; it has fine Second Empire styling, with corner quoining and a bracketed mansard roof.

The district was listed on the National Register of Historic Places in 1980, and expanded slightly in 1988.

== See also ==
- National Register of Historic Places listings in Providence, Rhode Island
