= Grove Street Elementary School =

- U.S. National Register of Historic Places
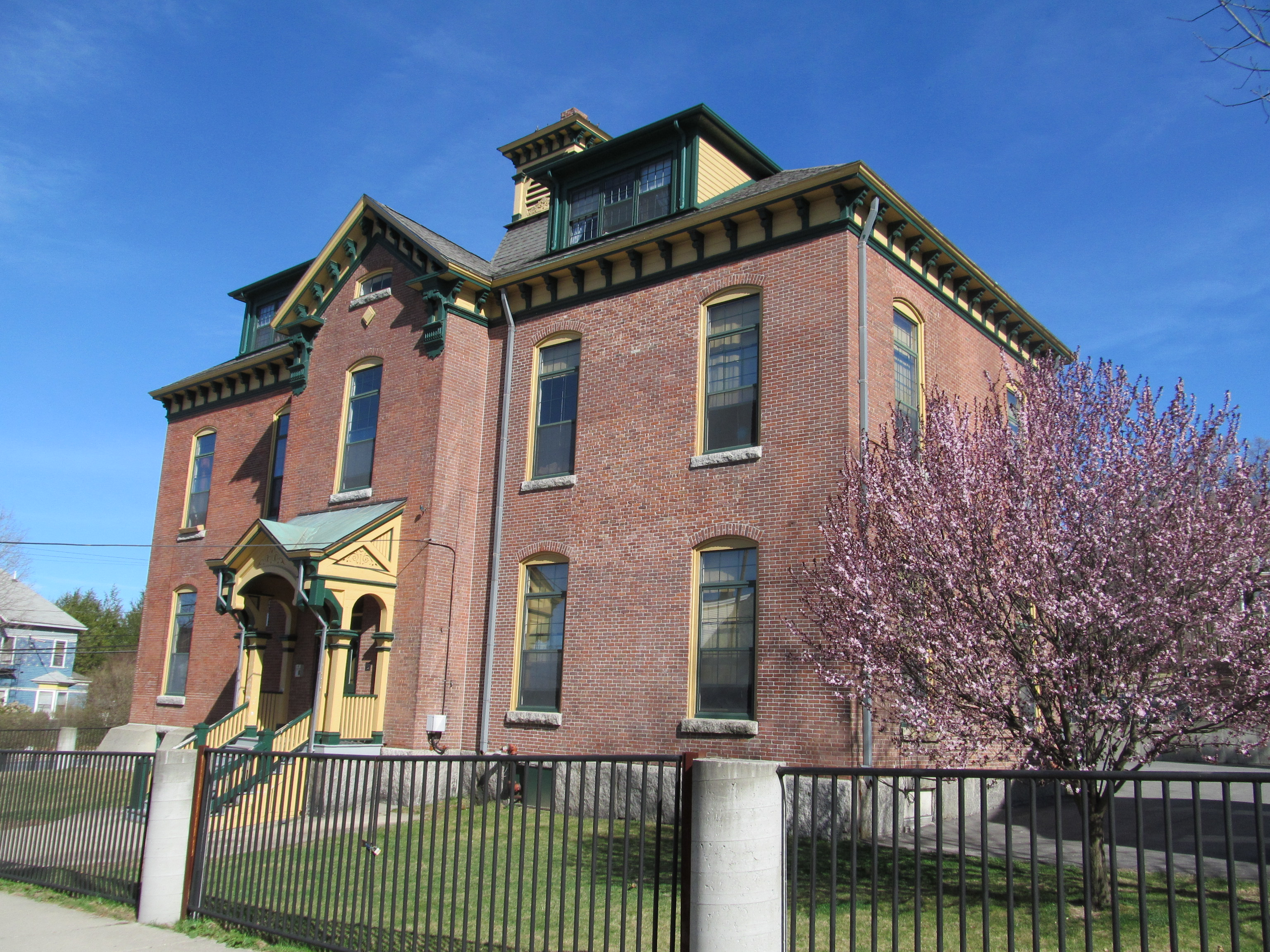
- Grove Street Elementary School

- Location within Rhode Island Location within the United States
- Location: Woonsocket, Rhode Island
- Coordinates: 41°59′55″N 71°30′32″W
- Built: 1876
- Built by: William Weicker
- Architect: Edward L. Angell
- Architectural style: Stick/Eastlake
- MPS: Woonsocket MRA
- NRHP reference No.: 82000138
- Added to NRHP: November 24, 1982

The Grove Street Elementary School is a historic school in Woonsocket, Rhode Island. The two-story brick Stick/Eastlake style school was designed by Edward L. Angell of Providence and built in 1876. In c. 1885 it was enlarged by adding a matching addition to its rear, joined by a small hyphen. This addition is more Queen Anne in its styling.

The building, a well-preserved example of modern schools of the 1870s, was listed on the National Register of Historic Places in 1982.

== See also ==
- National Register of Historic Places listings in Providence County, Rhode Island
