= Congdon Street Baptist Church =

Historic church in Rhode Island, United States

- U.S. National Register of Historic Places
- U.S. National Historic Landmark District – Contributing property
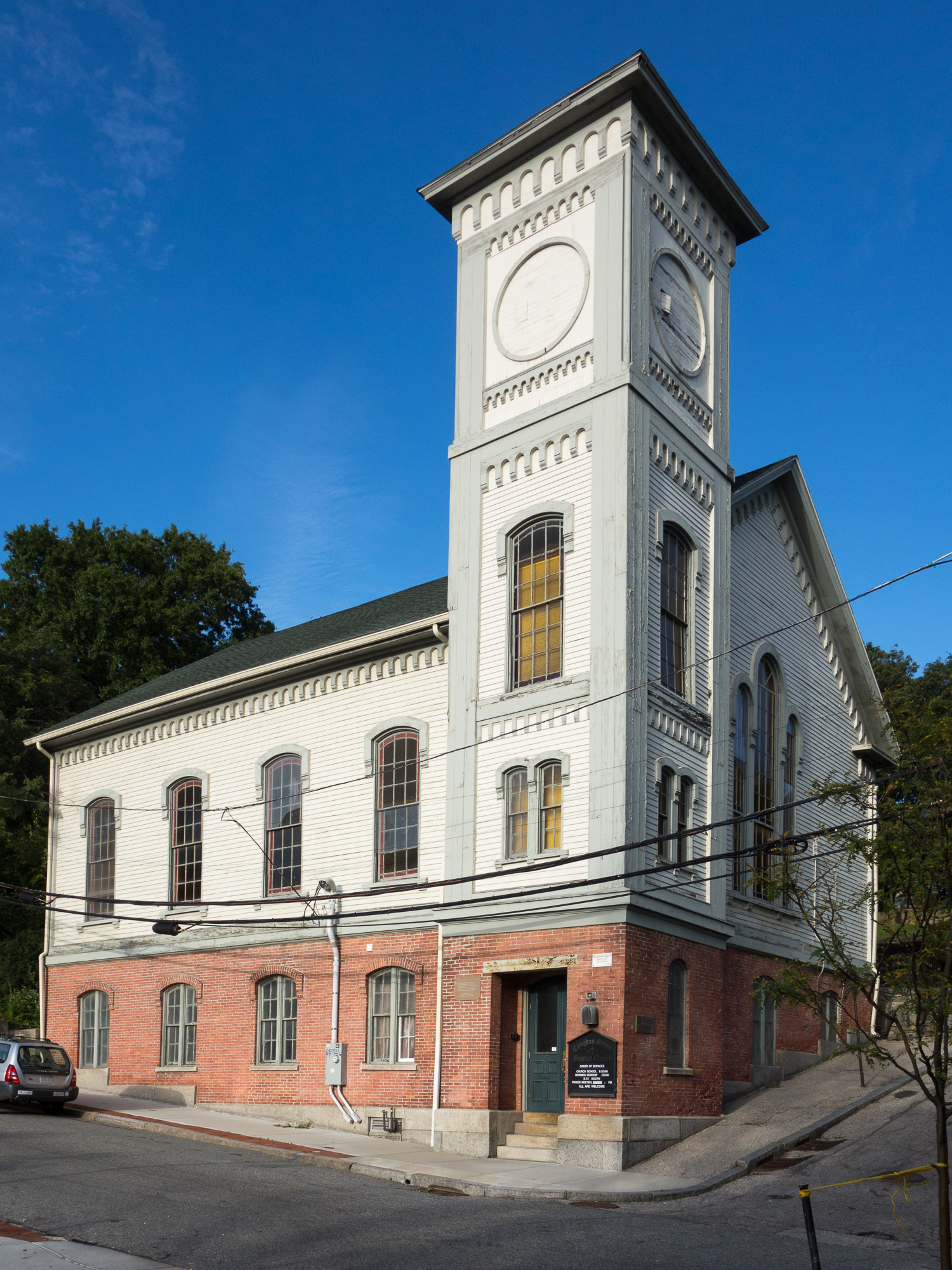
- (2012)

- Location within Rhode Island Location within the United States
- Location: Providence, Rhode Island
- Coordinates: 41°49′42″N 71°24′25″W
- Built: 1874
- Architect: Hartshorn & Wilcox
- Architectural style: Italianate
- Part of: College Hill Historic District (ID70000019)
- NRHP reference No.: 71000032

Significant dates
- Added to NRHP: June 21, 1971
- Designated NHLDCP: November 10, 1970

The Congdon Street Baptist Church is an historically African American church at 17 Congdon Street in the College Hill neighborhood of Providence, Rhode Island. In its early years the congregation was part of the African Union Meeting and Schoolhouse.

== Description and history ==
The congregation was established in 1819 and originally met in a building located near the present site, the land having been given to them by Moses Brown. The building was torn down in 1869 without the congregation's knowledge or approval by white neighbors. The present building, a single-story Italianate structure, was built in 1874–75. The eaves and gables are decorated with sawn woodwork that resembles brick corbeling. The windows along the long sides of the building are tall sash windows with a segmented-arch top, while the street-facing gable end has a three-part round-arch window. The stages of the square tower repeat the corbel woodwork at each level. The church is set into a hill, exposing a full brick basement, through which entrance to the building is gained. The interior is decorated with plain Victorian woodwork and stenciling on the walls.

The architects were Hartshorn & Wilcox. Hartshorn was the successor of Thomas A. Tefft and this church echoes many of his designs.

In December 1968, 65 Black students from Brown University marched down College Hill to the Congdon Street Baptist Church. They remained in the church for three days, as a protest of the small number of Black students admitted to the University as well as a lack of institutional support.

The building was listed on the National Register of Historic Places in 1971 for its architectural significance, and is part of the College Hill Historic District

== Gallery ==
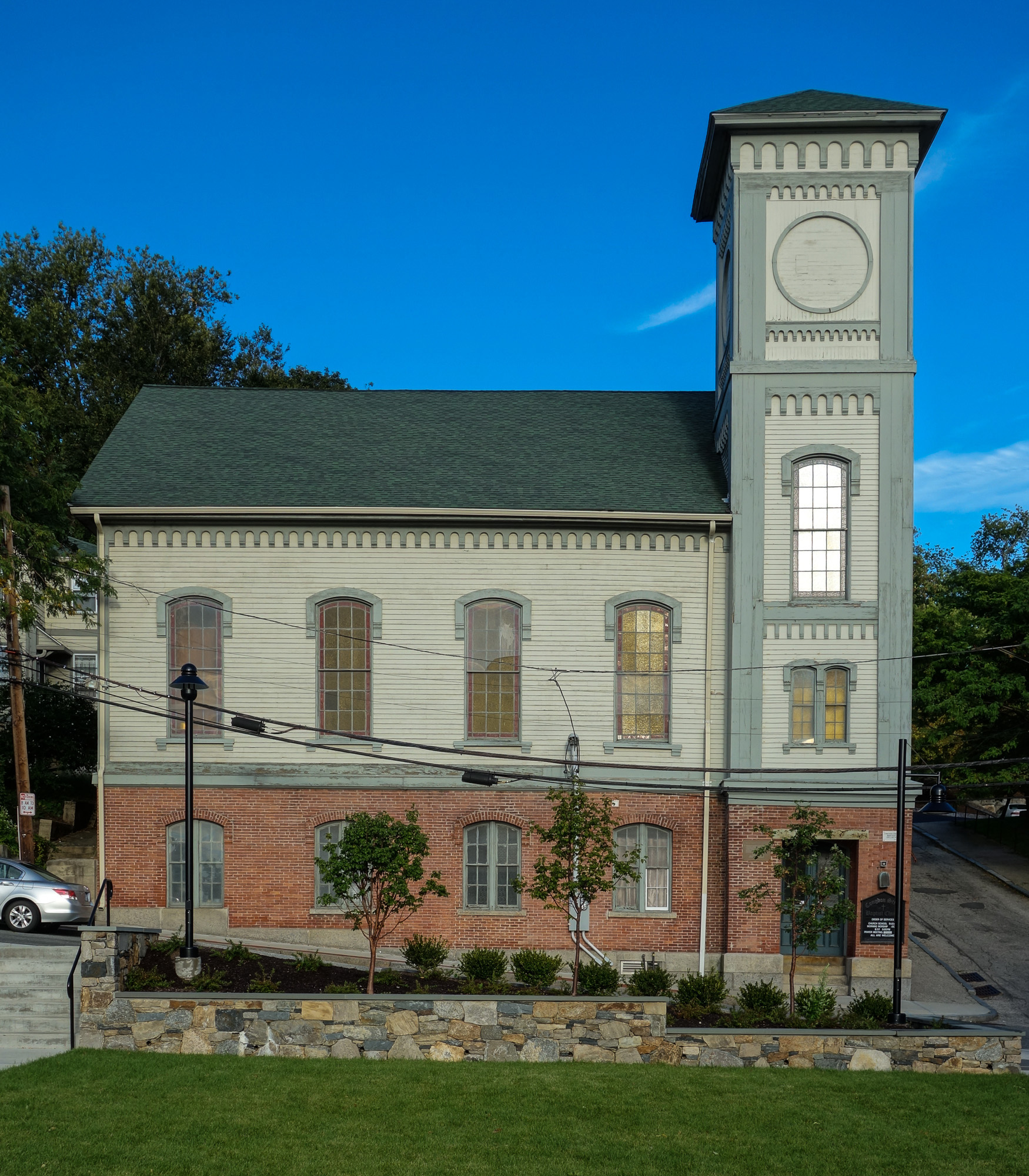
View from the west in 2012

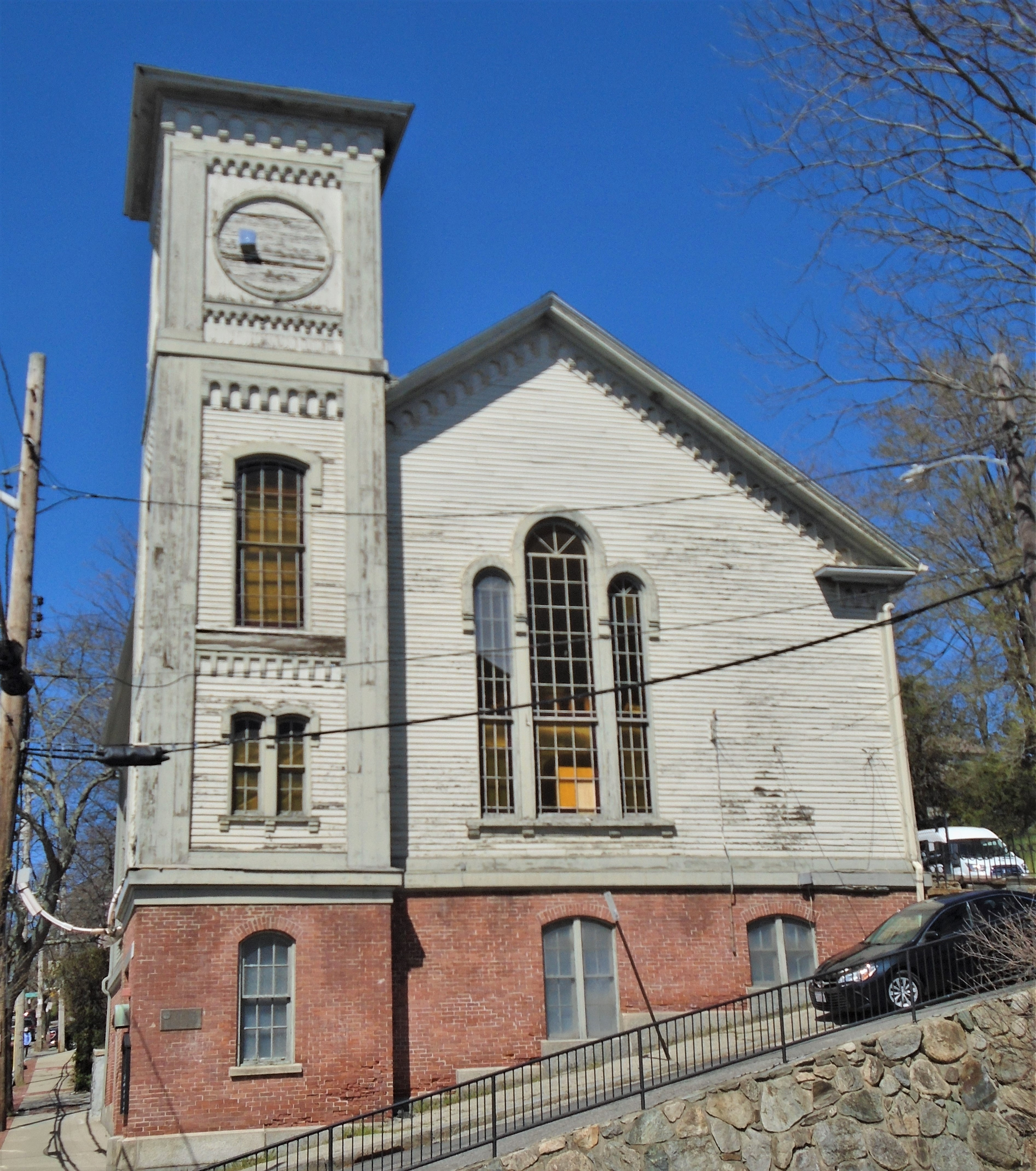
View from the south in 2021, showing the deterioration of the exterior

== See also ==
- National Register of Historic Places listings in Providence, Rhode Island
