= Westminster Street Historic District =

Historic district in Rhode Island, United States

- U.S. National Register of Historic Places
- U.S. Historic district
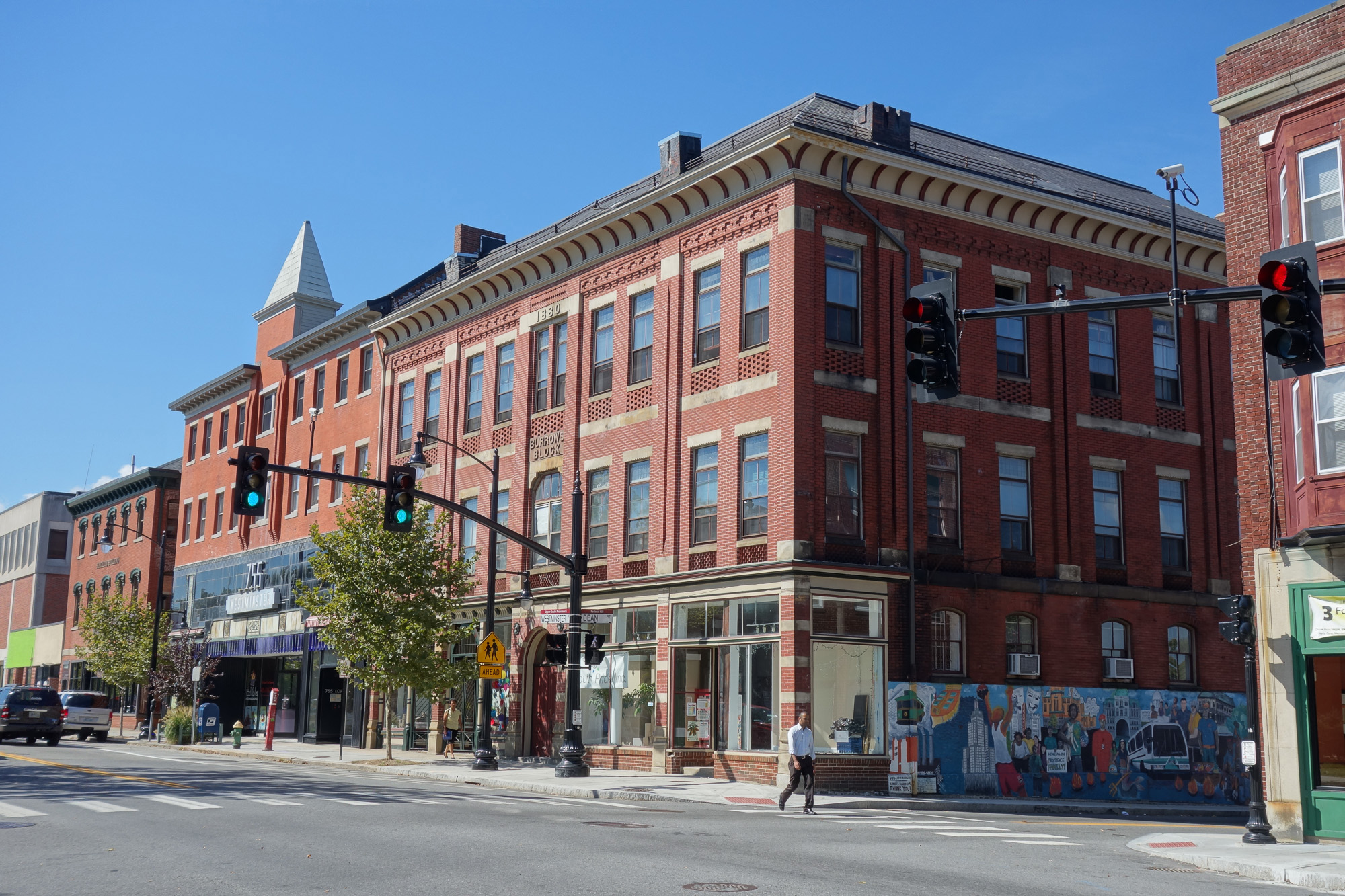
- West half of the district

- Location within Rhode Island Location within the United States
- Location: Providence, Rhode Island
- Coordinates: 41°49′6″N 71°25′13″W
- Area: 1 acre (0.40 ha)
- Built: 1870
- Architectural style: Art Deco, Late Victorian
- NRHP reference No.: 03000494
- Added to NRHP: May 30, 2003

Westminster Street Historic District is a commercial historic district consisting of six buildings along the north side of Westminster Street in Providence, Rhode Island, a short way west of Interstate 95. Three of the buildings are located just west of Dean Street, while the other three are just to its east. Five of the six buildings were constructed between 1870 and 1900, and the sixth in 1933. These five, the most prominent of which is the Burrows Block are uniformly built of brick and masonry, while the Chiapinelli Block, at the eastern end of the district, is an Art Deco office building with a concrete main facade and brick sidewalls.

The district was listed on the National Register of Historic Places in 2003.

== Gallery ==
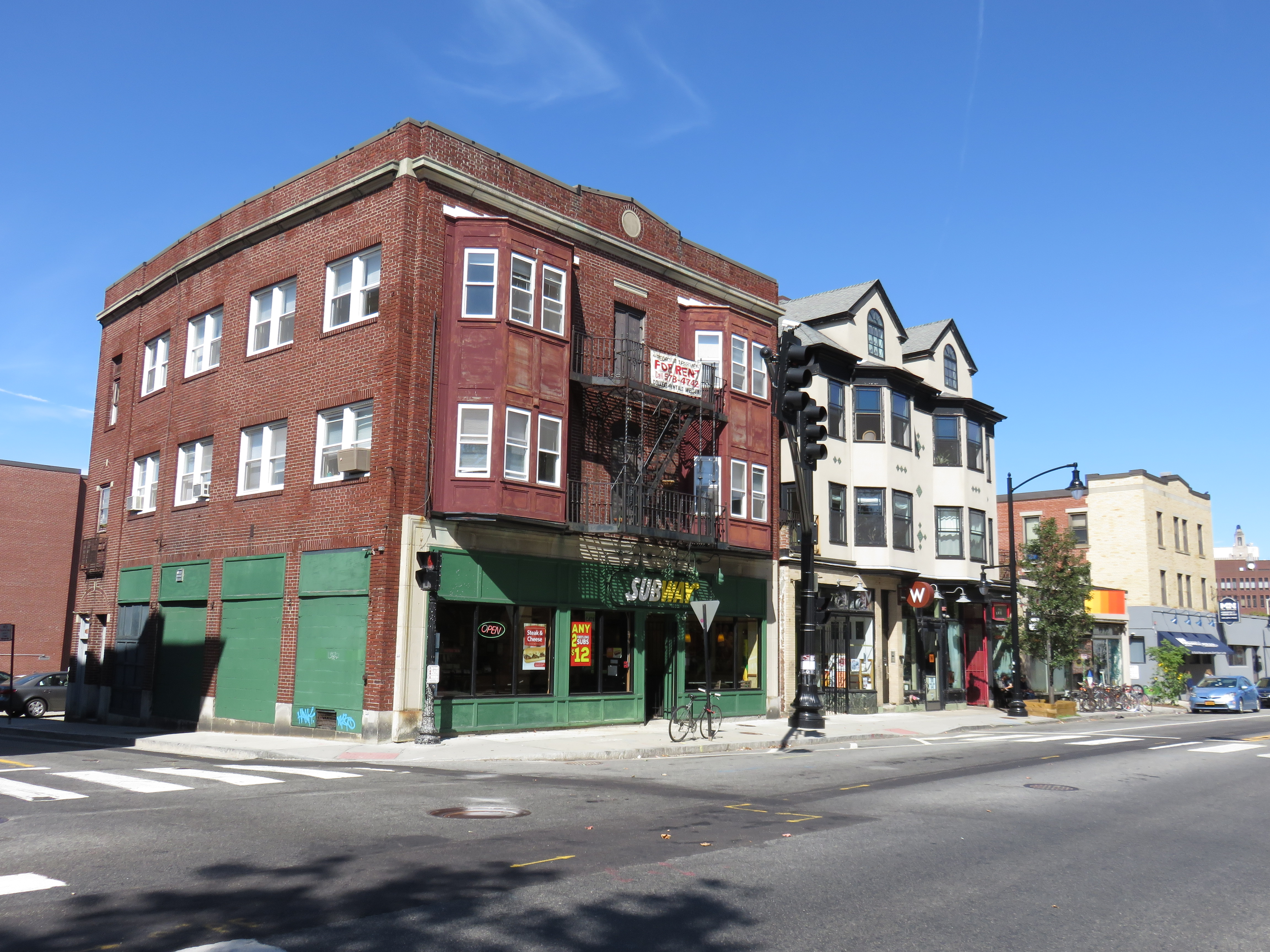
East half of the district

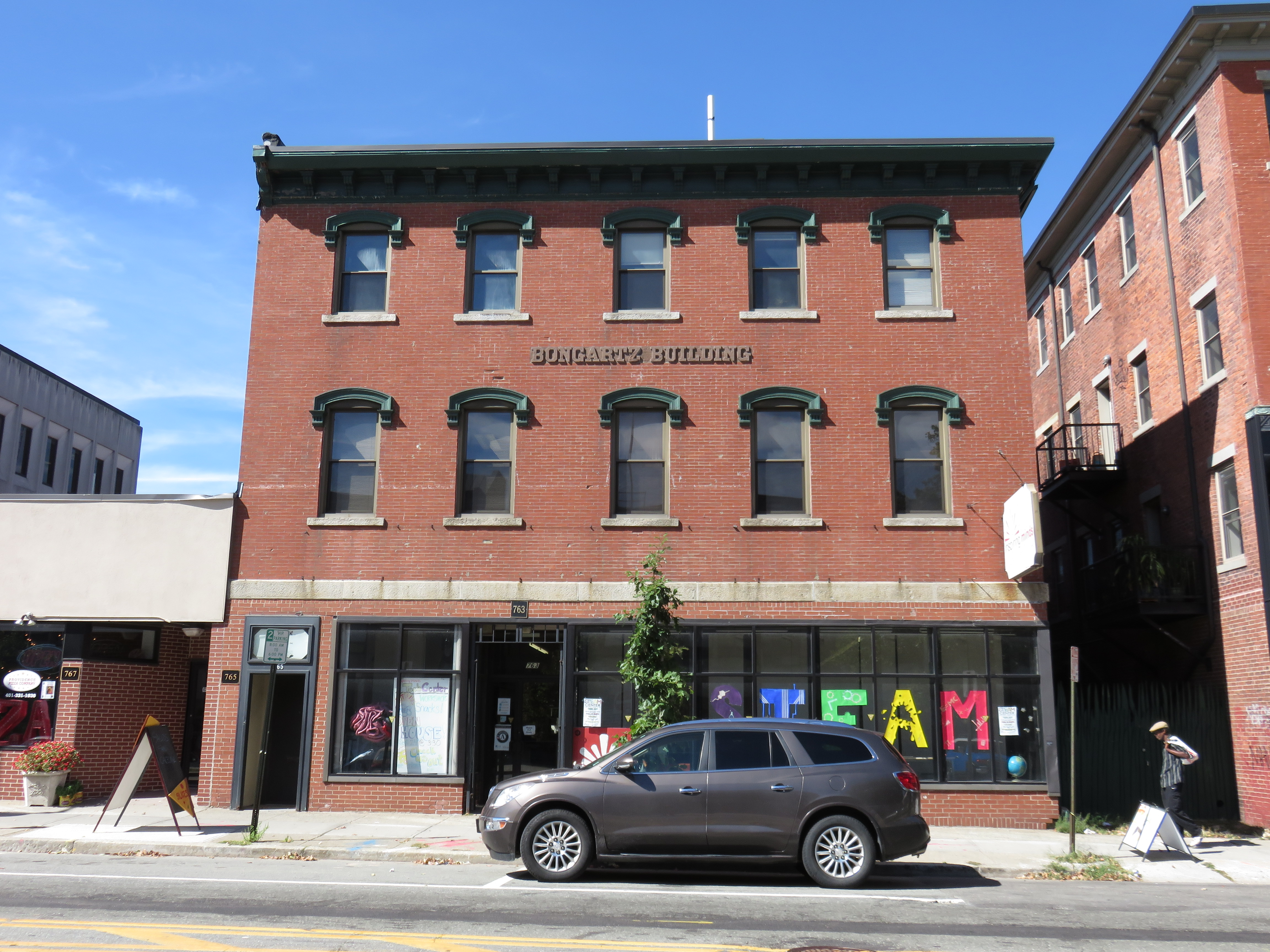
765–769 Westminster Street (Bongartz Building)

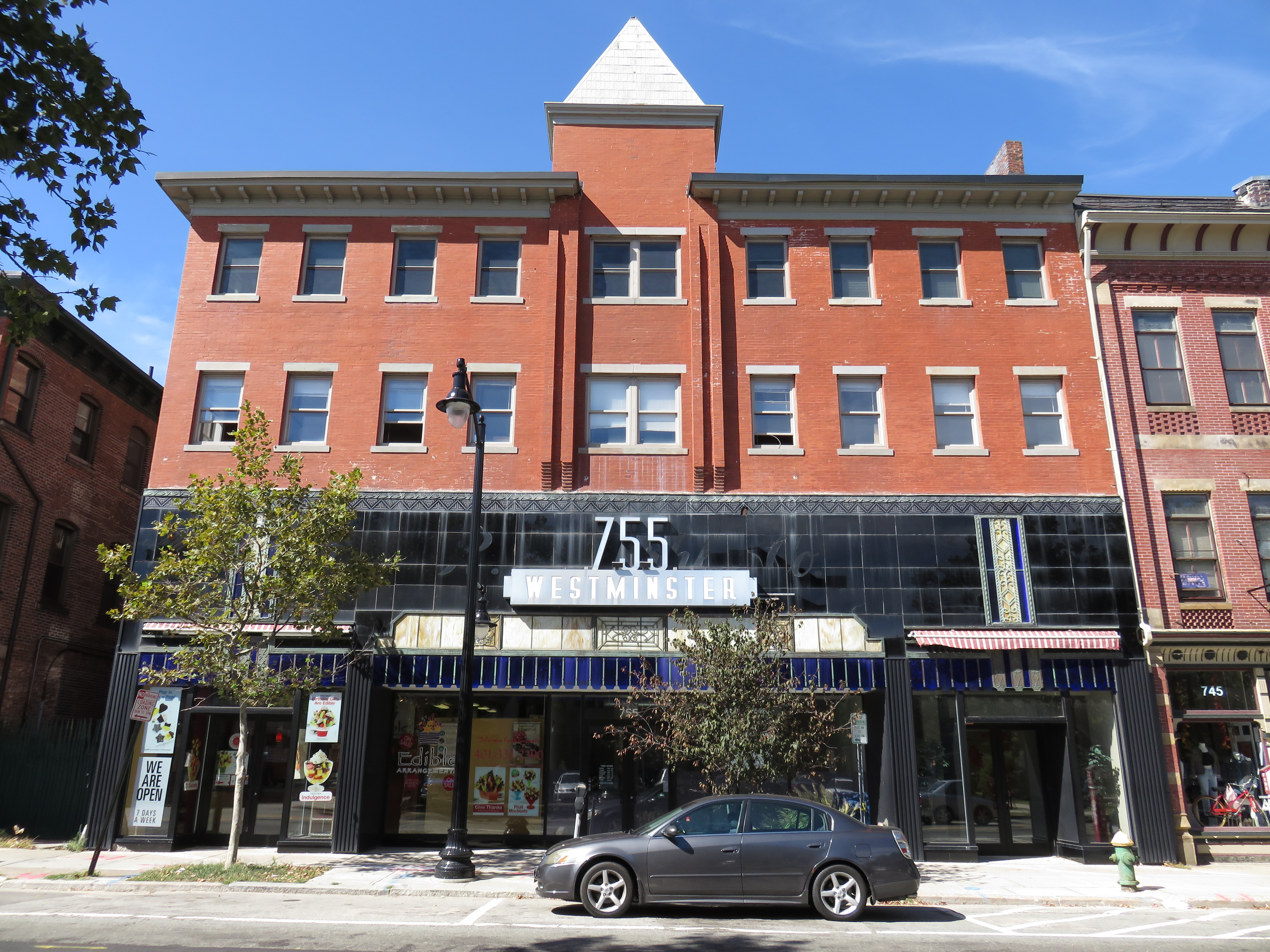
747–755 Westminster Street

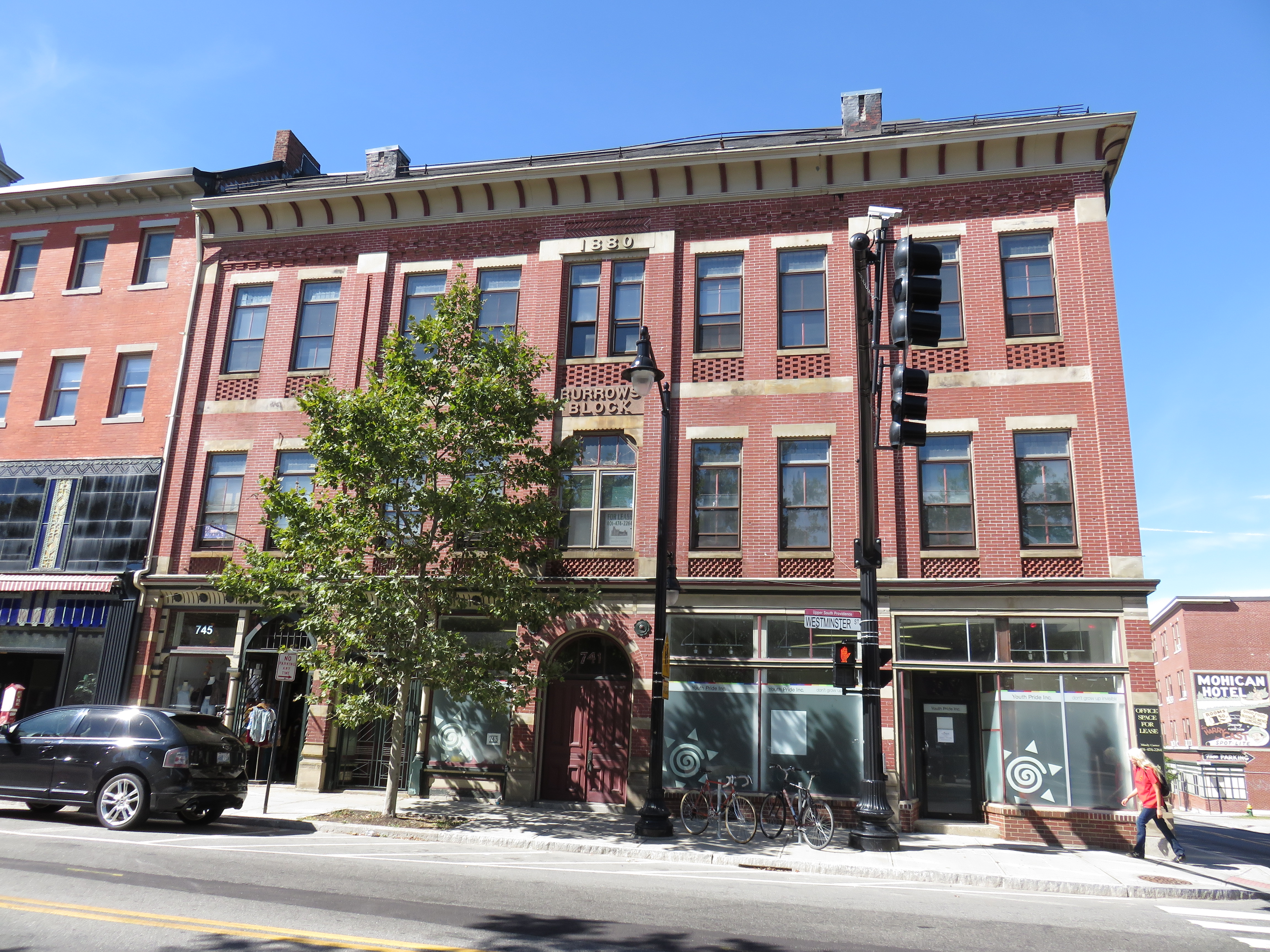
735–745 Westminster Street (Burrows Block)

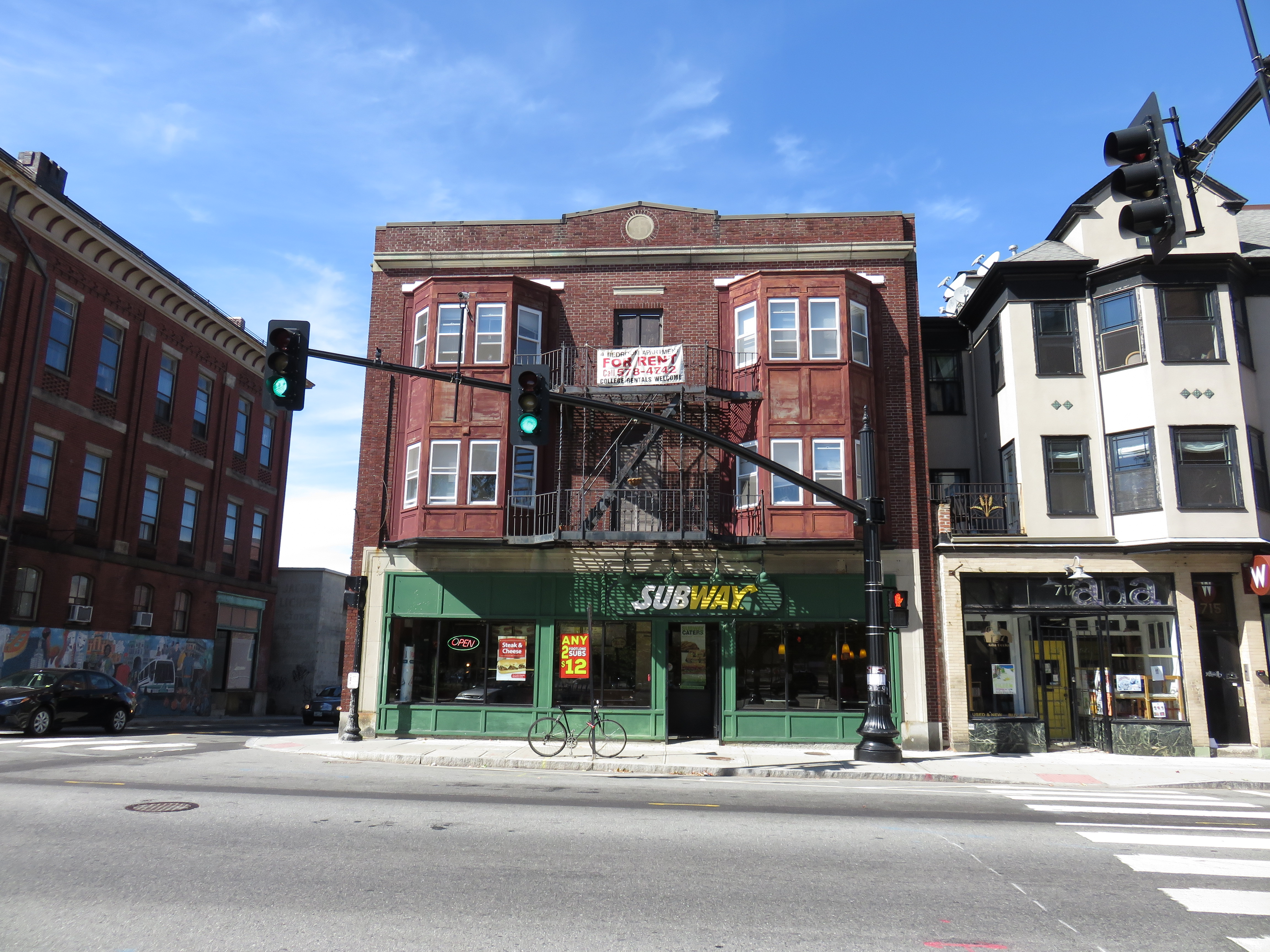
719–725 Westminster Street

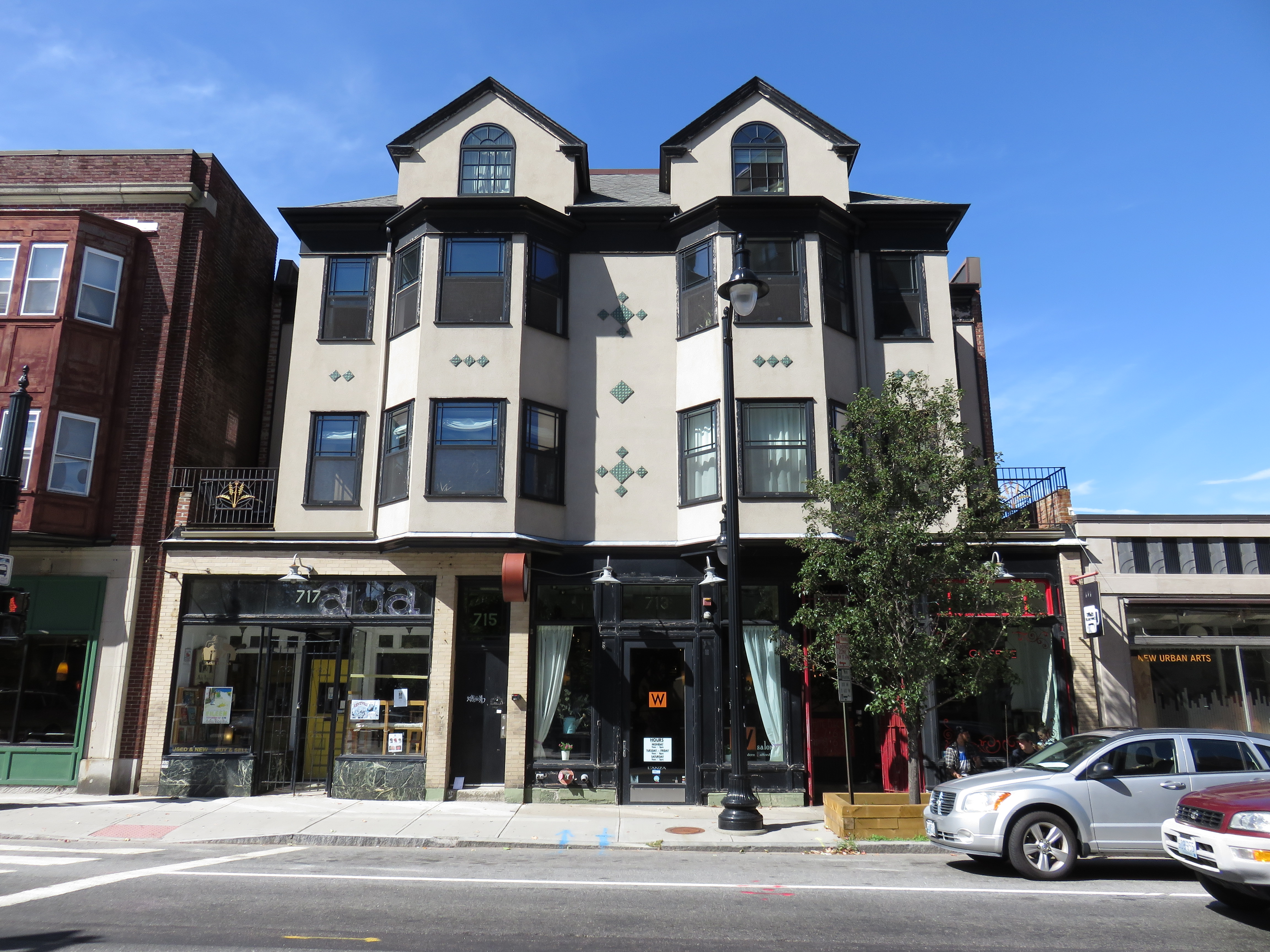
711–717 Westminster Street

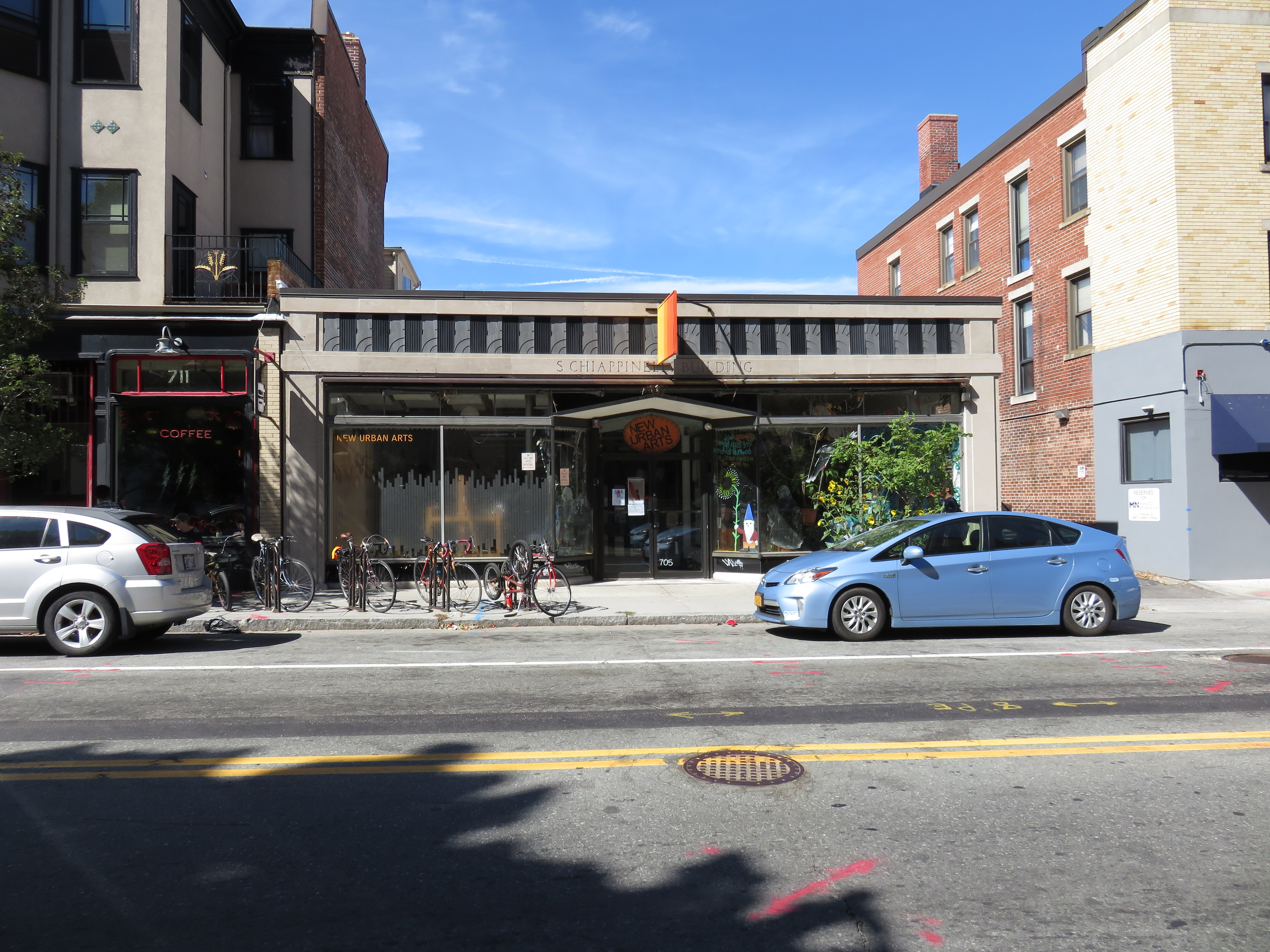
705 Westminster Street (S. Chiappinelli Building)

== See also ==
- National Register of Historic Places listings in Providence, Rhode Island
