= Moosup, Connecticut =

Census-designated place in Connecticut, United States

- Village
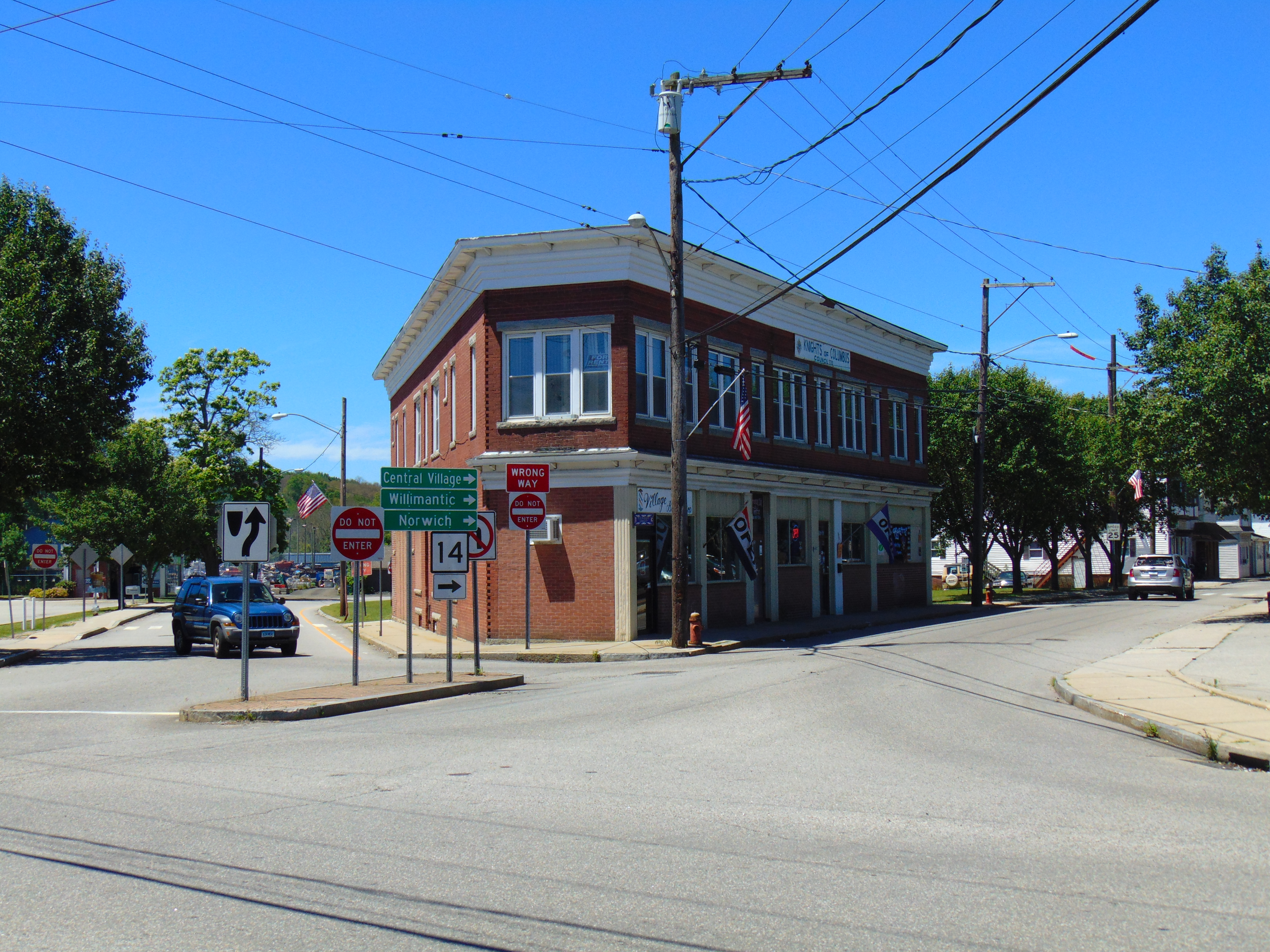
- The Center of Moosup

- Location in Windham County and the state of Connecticut.
- Coordinates: 41°42′46″N 71°52′51″W
- Country: United States
- State: Connecticut
- Town: Plainfield

Area
  - Total: 2.3 sq mi (6.0 km^{2})
  - Land: 2.2 sq mi (5.7 km^{2})
  - Water: 0.04 sq mi (0.10 km^{2})
- Elevation: 246 ft (75 m)

Population (2024)
  - Total: 3,166
  - Density: 1,400/sq mi (560/km^{2})
- Time zone: UTC−5 (Eastern Standard Time)
  - Summer (DST): UTC−4 (EDT)
- ZIP code: 06354
- Area code: 860
- FIPS code: 09-49180
- GNIS feature ID: 2377833

Moosup is a village and census-designated place (CDP) in the town of Plainfield, Connecticut, in the United States. The population was 3,166 at the 2024 census.

== History ==
Moosup is named after Sachem Maussup or Moosup (1623–1676) of the Narragansett Indians. The town was established in 1689 a little more than a decade after Maussup's death at the hands of Mohawks.

== Geography ==
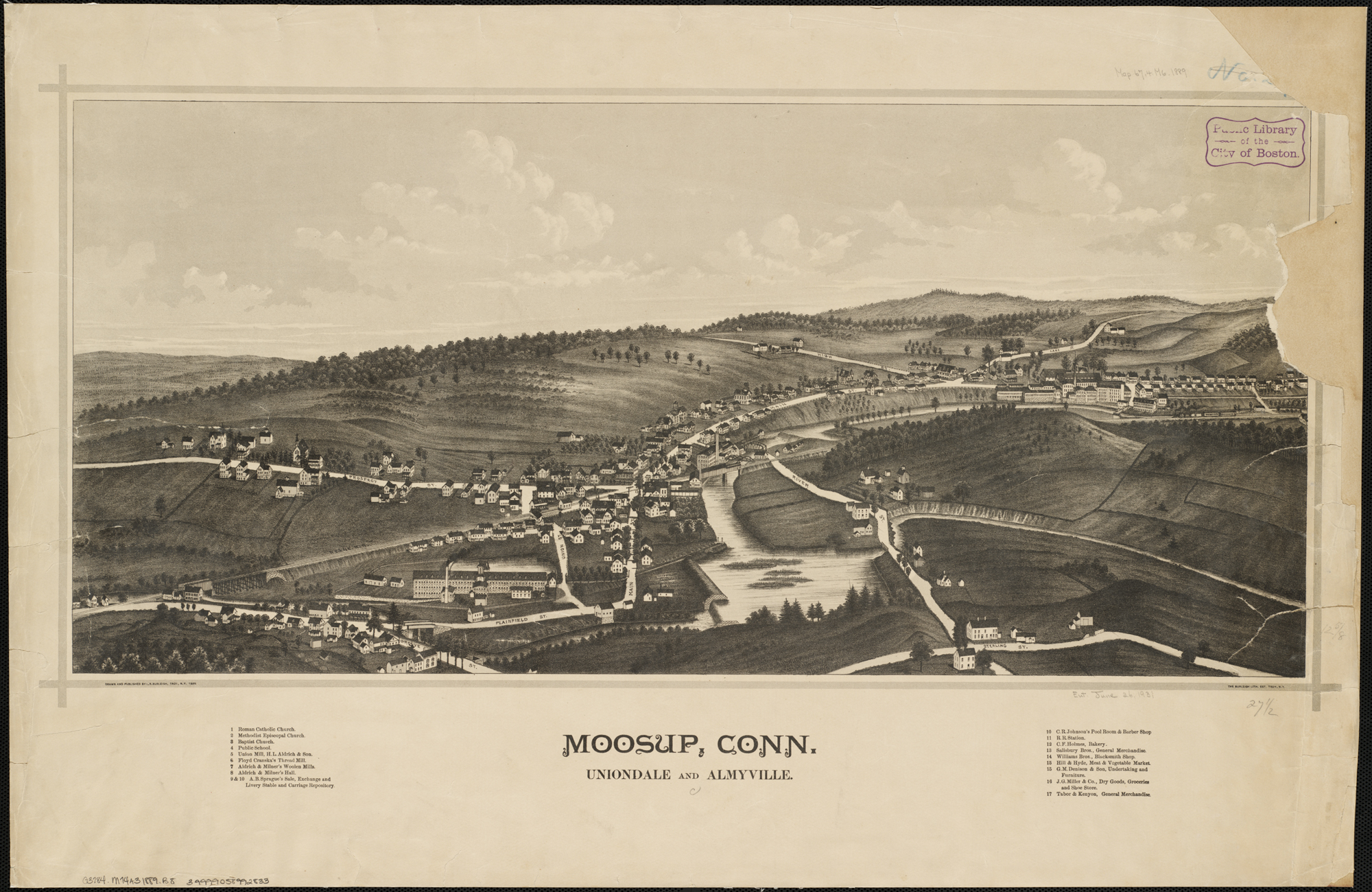
Lithograph of Moosup from 1889 by L.R. Burleigh with list of landmarks

According to the United States Census Bureau, the CDP has a total area of 2.3 square miles (6.0 km^{2}), of which 2.2 square miles (5.7 km^{2}) is land and 0.04 square miles (0.10 km^{2}) (0.85%) is water.

== Demographics ==
As of the census of 2000, there were 3,237 people, 1,263 households, and 837 families residing in the CDP. The population density was 1,390.4 inhabitants per square mile (536.8/km^{2}). There were 1,321 housing units at an average density of 567.4 per square mile (219.1/km^{2}). The racial makeup of the CDP was 95.83% White, 0.59% African American, 0.68% Native American, 0.90% Asian, 0.96% from other races, and 1.05% from two or more races. Hispanic or Latino of any race were 3.12% of the population.

There were 1,263 households, out of which 36.3% had children under the age of 18 living with them, 43.1% were married couples living together, 18.5% had a female householder with no husband present, and 33.7% were non-families. 26.0% of all households were made up of individuals, and 9.8% had someone living alone who was 65 years of age or older. The average household size was 2.56 and the average family size was 3.06.

In the CDP, the population was spread out, with 28.5% under the age of 18, 9.9% from 18 to 24, 31.5% from 25 to 44, 18.8% from 45 to 64, and 11.2% who were 65 years of age or older. The median age was 33 years. For every 100 females, there were 92.7 males. For every 100 females age 18 and over, there were 89.7 males.

The median income for a household in the CDP was $40,000, and the median income for a family was $43,164. Males had a median income of $38,750 versus $20,581 for females. The per capita income for the CDP was $16,827. About 9.8% of families and 10.6% of the population were below the poverty line, including 17.8% of those under age 18 and 1.5% of those age 65 or over.

== Notable people ==
Moosup is the childhood home of Major League Baseball (MLB) player Walt Dropo (January 30, 1923 – December 17, 2010). A "giant of a man," Dropo was affectionately known as "the Moose from Moosup." During a 13-year career in MLB, he played for the Boston Red Sox (1949–1952), Detroit Tigers (1952–1954), Chicago White Sox (1955–1958), Cincinnati Redlegs (1958–1959) and Baltimore Orioles (1959–1961). Dropo's parents emigrated from Mostar, Yugoslavia (now Bosnia and Herzegovina), to start a new life. His father, Savo, worked at the local textile mill while also running their Connecticut family farm. Walt was raised in Moosup, Connecticut, where he played sandlot baseball with his brothers Milton and George, and attended Plainfield High School in Central Village, Connecticut, before attending the University of Connecticut.

== See also ==
- Mill Ridge Manor
