= Fayerweather =

Fayerweather may refer to:

== People ==
- George Fayerweather (c. 1802–1869), American blacksmith
- Julia Fayerweather Afong (1840–1919), Hawaiian high chiefess
- Mary Jane Kekulani Fayerweather (1842–1930) Hawaiian high chiefess, musician, teacher, and rancher
- Sarah Harris Fayerweather (1812–1878), American activist

== Other uses ==
- Fayerweather Island, island in Connecticut
- Fayerweather & Ladew, leather manufacturer
- George Fayerweather Blacksmith Shop, blacksmith shop in Rhode Island
