= Canterbury Female Boarding School =

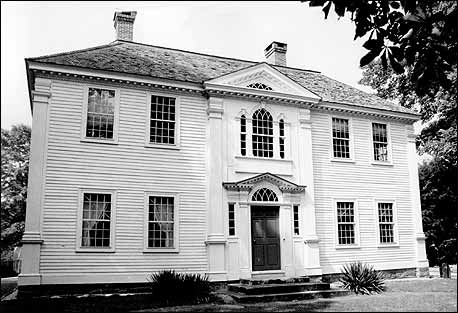
- Site of Canterbury Female Boarding School, now the Prudence Crandall Museum.

Location
- 1 South Canterbury Road; Canterbury, Connecticut 06331; United States; 41.698130°N 71.971610°W

Information
- Other name: School for Young Ladies and Little Misses of Color
- Type: Boarding
- Established: October 1831
- Founder: Prudence Crandall
- Closed: September 10, 1834. Closed briefly in March 1833 as it converted into a school for African-American "young ladies and little misses of color", which reopened April 1833.
- Principal: Prudence Crandall
- Staff: Mariah Davis
- Faculty: Prudence Crandall, her sister Almira Crandall, Samuel May, William Burleigh
- Gender: Female
- Enrollment: 24
- Campus type: Large house on Canterbury town square
- Supporters: William Lloyd Garrison, Rev. Simeon Jocelyn, Rev. Samuel J. May, Arthur Tappan
- Enemies: Andrew T. Judson
- Relevant legislation: Connecticut Black Law, passed May 24, 1833, repealed 1838, prohibiting educating African Americans not from Connecticut, who were not citizens and did not have rights.
- Legal issue: Whether African Americans were citizens
- Supreme Court references: Dred Scott v. Sandford, Brown v. Board of Education
- Website: Prudence Crandall Museum, state of Connecticut

The Canterbury Female Boarding School, in Canterbury, Connecticut, was operated by its founder, Prudence Crandall, from 1831 to 1834. When townspeople would not allow African-American girls to enroll, Crandall decided to turn it into a school for African-American girls only, the first such in the United States. The Connecticut legislature passed a law against it, and Crandall was arrested and spent a night in jail, bringing national publicity. Community violence forced Crandall to close the school.

The episode is a major incident in the history of school desegregation in the United States. The case Crandall v. State was "the first full-throated civil rights case in U.S. history.... The Crandall case [in which a key issue was whether blacks were citizens] helped influence the outcome of two of the most fateful Supreme Court decisions, Dred Scott v. Sandford in 1857[] and...Brown v. Board of Education in 1954."

== Background ==
In 1831, the town of Canterbury approached Prudence Crandall, a well-educated Quaker teacher, who was teaching in nearby Plainfield. There was no school for girls in their town, and they asked if she would establish one; "an unusual number of young girls then growing up in the village families awakened parental solicitude". She agreed, and purchased for the school a mansion, now a museum, on the town square. It was next to that of lawyer, politician, and town clerk Andrew T. Judson, one of her first supporters, who would be at the center of the opposition to the school, once a black girl was admitted. "The idea of having a school of nigger girls so near him was insupportable."

The school opened in November, 1831, and in 1831–1832 "enjoyed the complete support of the community" and was soon a success. "The cordiality and friendliness of her reception were gratefully acknowledged by Miss Crandall, her relations with pupils and patrons were most agreeable and harmonious, and it seemed likely that this much-needed institution would become permanently established." Subjects taught included reading, writing, arithmetic, English grammar, geography, history, chemistry, astronomy, and moral philosophy. Basic tuition and room and board cost $25 (equivalent to $756 in 2025) per quarter. Students paid extra fees for instruction in drawing, painting, piano, and French. "Crandall was able to pay off the $1,500 mortgage (equivalent to $45,352 in 2025) within a year." The school soon was at its capacity of 24 students.

== Sarah Harris ==
In late 1831 Prudence hired as servant help "a young black lady", Mariah Davis. Her fiancé, Charles Harris, was the son of the local agent for the new abolitionist newspaper, The Liberator, published in Boston. Mariah read the paper, which she loaned to Prudence, who also read it, reporting that "My sympathies were greatly aroused." She also sometimes sat in on classes, which did not attract attention as she was an employee and not enrolled as a student.

Mariah introduced Prudence to Charles' sister, Sarah Harris. In November, 1832, she asked Prudence to admit her to the school; she wished to become a teacher of black students. At first hesitant, Prudence consulted her Bible, which, as she told it, came open to Ecclesiastes 4:1:

So I returned, and considered all the oppressions that are done under the sun: and behold the tears of such as were oppressed, and they had no comforter; and on the side of their oppressors there was power; but they had no comforter. [King James Version]

She then admitted the girl as a day student, establishing the first integrated school in the United States. Prominent townspeople objected and placed pressure on Crandall to dismiss Harris from the school, but she refused to "dismiss 'the nigger girl'". Prudence related in a letter that "the wife of an Episcopal clergyman who lived in the village told me that if I continued that colored girl in my school it could not be sustained. I replied to her, That it might sink, then, for I should not turn her out!" She "truly liked Sarah Harris as a person".

== Canterbury opposition ==
To educate blacks and whites together was unacceptable to the town of Canterbury. "The people of Canterbury saw to their supreme horror and consternation that this popular school in which they had taken so much pride was to be superseded by something so anomalous and phenomenal that it could hardly be comprehended." A delegation of townspeople "found her as before, firm as a rock." When a spokesman "delicately hinted at the danger that might ensue from 'these leveling principles and intermarriage between the whites and blacks,'" she bluntly replied "Moses had a black wife." "Reports of these unsatisfactory interviews increased the pervading excitement to actual frenzy." The school immediately lost the support of the townspeople, which it had enjoyed, and parents began to withdraw their daughters,

with the apprehension that a dire calamity was impending over them; that Miss Crandall was the author or instrument of it; that there were powerful conspirators engaged with her in the plot; and that the people of Canterbury should be roused by every consideration of self-preservation as well as self-respect to prevent the accomplishment of the design.

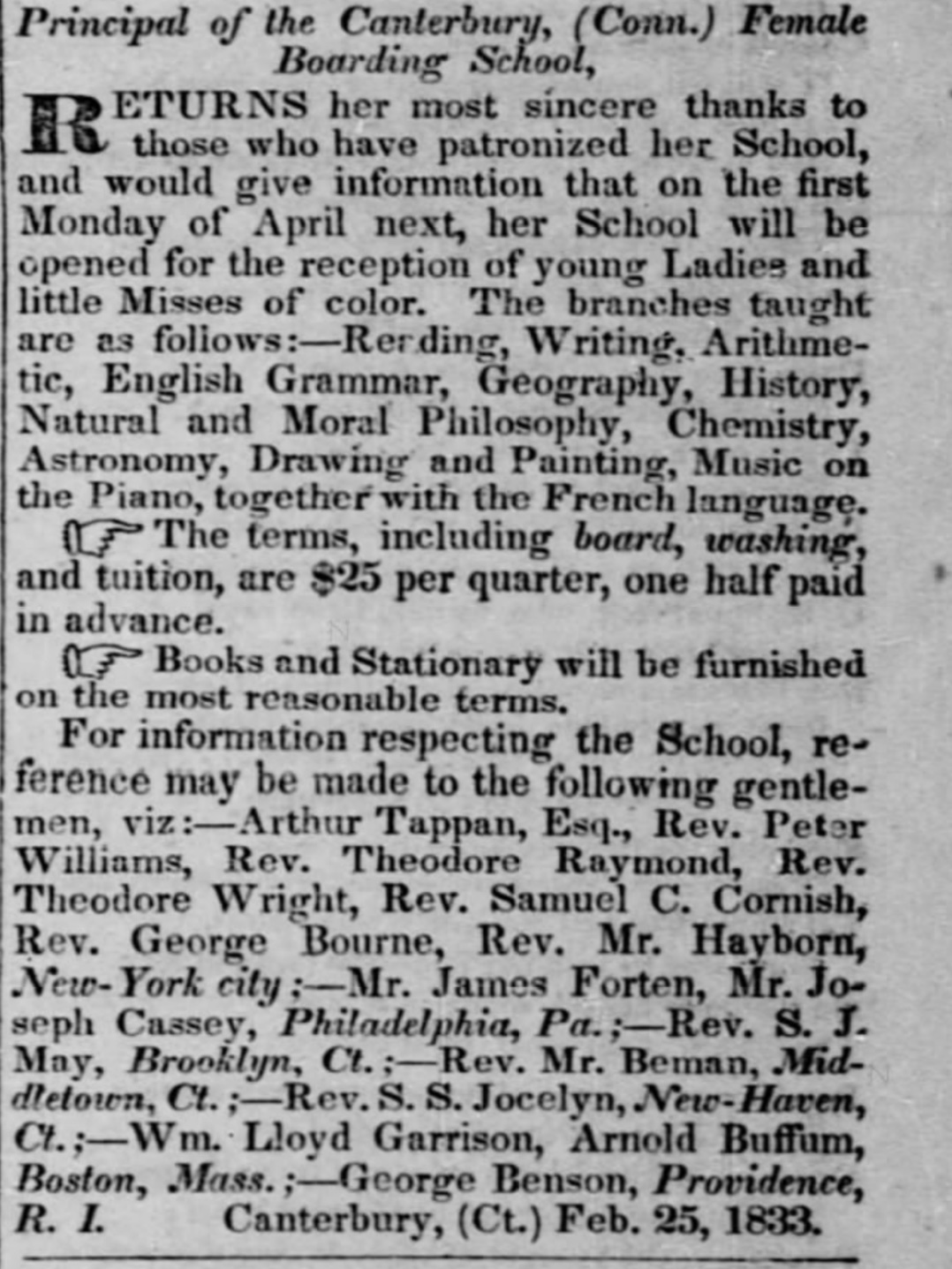
Advertisement in The Liberator of March 2, 1833, of Prudence Crandall's school for "young Ladies and little Misses of color".

In order for the school to survive while keeping Sarah as a student, Crandall realized that something must be done. Her idea, and it was hers alone, was to convert her school into one serving "young Ladies and little Misses of color", as she put it in a subsequent advertisement. There was no such school in the United States. To see if this was viable she travelled to Boston to meet with William Lloyd Garrison, editor of The Liberator. Encouraging her, he supplied her with letters of introduction to philanthropist Arthur Tappan and to leading black families in New York and Providence, Rhode Island, both of which she visited to assess interest in such a school. Interest was such that she went ahead with her plan of closing the existing school, which was doomed because of her refusal to expel Sarah, and reopening it as a school for black girls. She announced it to the existing students in a meeting on February 25, 1833. An advertisement in The Liberator of March 2, 1833 (see sidebar), announced that the new school would open April 1. The reactions of the "anxious, angry citizens intent to devise some scheme of escape from the crushing calamity of 'a school of nigger girls'" are outlined in the previous section.

The town reaction was panic. Urged on by Judson, a colonizationist whose position was that free blacks should leave the United States and go to Africa, by what means he failed to propose. The racist townspeople believed that Canterbury would become the center of a vast and lustful colony of free blacks, and that alone would be a threat to the very survival of the United States:

[T]he establishment or rendezvous falsely denominated a school was designed by its projectors as the theatre, as the place to promulgate their disgusting doctrines of amalgamation [intermarriage, miscegenation] and their pernicious sentiments of subverting the Union. Their pupils were to have been congregated here from all quarters under the false pretence of educating them, but really to SCATTER FIRE-BRANDS, arrows and death among brethren of our own blood."

Town leaders believed that Crandall's school would "tend to the great increase of colored population", or as Ellison put it, "educating them will fill our state with a vicious and pauper population." Behind this are two beliefs, at the time widespread:

1. That blacks were not capable of being raised up and should not be raised up here, with dangerously strong bodies, dominated by lust, the inferiors of whites. The contradiction indicated in this belief never appeared to be admitted, and
2. Though forgotten today, a proposed solution to "the freedman problem" was to give them land in some part of the country, a sort of reservation for blacks, or a Liberia in North America, or in Chiriquí, in what is today Panama (see Linconia). — The "freedman problem" was what was going to be done with the growing numbers of free former slaves, how they would eat and where they would live. A main reason for opposition to abolitionism was that the only national policy on freed slaves was to get rid of them by shipping them off to Liberia. This solution was not working; participation was low, funding totally inadequate, and even the U.S. Navy with all its ships could not have transported blacks to Africa at the rate new blacks were being born. So they're staying. That was certainly the cheapest solution. You see them more and more. (They're hard to miss.) But where? They were perceived as immigrants, taking jobs away from whites by working for less. And there were millions of them.

Add to this the fact that more blacks lived in Connecticut, its southernmost state, than in the rest of New England combined. So the white inhabitants of Windham County, Connecticut, were concerned, as they were at the sites of anti-abolitionist riots.

Prudence offered to move the school, but this was not sufficient. According to Judson, who was a life member of the American Colonization Society,

[W]e are not merely opposed to the establishment of that school in Canterbury; we mean there shall not be such a school set up anywhere in our State. The colored people never can rise from their menial condition in our country; they ought not to be permitted to rise here. They are an inferior race of beings, and never can or ought to be recognized as the equals of the whites. Africa is the place for them. I am in favor of the Colonization scheme. Let the niggers and their descendants be sent back to their fatherland.

Prudence "went on her way making preparation for her pupils, with a firmness of design and a decision of action worthy [of] the holiest cause."

== The school for "young Ladies and little Misses of color" ==
The school reopened as announced with "some ten or twelve quiet, harmless little colored girls or young ladies, from the very best colored families in the Northern cities." A visitor in June reported "17 girls, as well behaved as any 17 you can find". Enrollment soon rose to 24 students, from as far away as Philadelphia. While Crandall never listed them publicly, testimony in her trial and other documents reveal that non-Connecticut students came from Massachusetts, New York, Pennsylvania, and Rhode Island. The names of the students include:

- Connecticut students:
  - Sarah Harris
  - Mary Harris, her sister
  - Harriet Roselle Lanson of New Haven, an orphan adopted by Simeon Jocelyn.
  - Eliza and Miranda Glasgow or Glasko, daughters of Isaac Glasgow, of Jewett City, Connecticut (other sources say they were from Smithfield, Rhode Island)
  - Mariah Davis
- Students from other states:
  - Theodosia DeGrasse (from New York, sister of John DeGrasse)
  - Ann Eliza Hammond (Providence, Rhode Island), who was subpoenaed
  - Ann Peterson
  - Julia Williams of Boston, later the best-known of the students, who left for the similarly-fated Noyes Academy, then the Oneida Institute
  - Ann Elizabeth Wilder (New York).
  - Mary E. Bibb, of Rhode Island

The curriculum was the same as previously, except that rhetoric was omitted.

== Legal measures ==
On May 24, 1833, the Connecticut General Assembly enacted a Black Law, drafted by Crandall's leading enemy Judson, which prohibited anyone from operating a school teaching African Americans from outside of Connecticut without the permission of the town in which the school was to be located.

WHEREAS, attempts have been made to establish literary institutions in this State, for the instruction of colored persons belonging to other States and countries, which would tend to the great increase of the colored population of the State, and thereby to the injury of the people : Therefore, Sec. 1. Be it enacted by the Senate and House of Representatives in General Assembly convened, That no person shall set up or establish in this State any school, academy, or literary institution, for the instruction or education of colored persons, who are not inhabitants of this State, nor instruct or teach in any school, academy, or other literary institution whatsoever in this State, or harbor or board, for the purpose of attending or being taught or instructed in any such school, academy, or literary institution, any colored person who is not an inhabitant of any town in this State, without the consent, in writing, first obtained of a majority of the civil authority, and also of the selectmen of the town in which such school, academy, or literary institution is situated; and each and every person who shall knowingly do any act forbidden as aforesaid, or shall be aiding or assisting therein, shall, for the first offence, forfeit and pay to the treasurer of this State, a fine of one hundred dollars, and for the second offence shall forfeit and pay a fine of two hundred dollars, and so double for every offence of which he or she shall be convicted.

Townspeople thereafter refused to deal with anyone teaching or enrolled at the school.

They insulted and annoyed her and her pupils in every way their malice could devise. The storekeepers, the butchers, the milk-pedlers [sic] of the town, all refused to supply their wants; and whenever her father, brother, or other relatives, who happily lived but a few miles off, were seen coming to bring her and her pupils the necessaries of life, they were insulted and threatened. Her well was defiled with the most offensive filth [manure], and her neighbors refused her and the thirsty ones about her even a cup of cold water, leaving them to depend for that essential element upon the scanty supplies that could be brought from her father’s farm. Nor was this all; the physician of the village refused to minister to any who were sick in Miss Crandall’s family, and the trustees of the church forbade her to come, with any of her pupils, into the House of the Lord.

When the town's physician was asked to treat a student that was ill, not only would he not see her, he "looked upon the request as a personal insult". "Vandals loosened or cut the harnesses that attached horses to the wagons or carriages of visitors to help the horse escape or to cause a potentially fatal accident."

Crandall ignored the law and was arrested, spending one night in jail. She could have avoided jail if a small fine had been paid, and supporters would have paid it, but she refused: "'I am only afraid they will not put me into jail. Their evident hesitation and embarrassment show plainly how much they deprecate the effect of this part of their folly; and therefore I am the more anxious that they should be exposed, if not caught in their own wicked devices.' ...[The sheriff] was ashamed to do it. He knew it would cover the persecutors of Miss Crandall and the State of Connecticut with disgrace." This proved to be the case, as seen in the following quote from the Boston Advocate:

This young lady, who is pious, and lovely in person, our informant adds, has actually been thrust into prison in the very cell that Watkins the murderer last occupied!!! In the name of ail that is manly and civilized, are we going back to the dark ages? Are there any free schools or religious societies in Connecticut? Are there no spare missionaries to be sent to Canterbury?

She was freed the following day.

Teacher Andrew Burleigh was arrested in 1834, but the charges were dropped when the school closed.

== Trials of Prudence Crandall ==
Crandall's first trial began on August 23, 1833. She pled "not guilty". Her lawyers were William W. Ellsworth, Calvin Goddard, and Henry W. Strong; they were recruited by Samuel May and paid by Arthur Tappan. Judson led the prosecuting attorneys. The jury was unable to reach a verdict.

A second trial began on October 3, 1833, but now at the Connecticut Supreme Court, under the direction of Judge David Daggett. Crandall's attorneys were Ellsworth and Goddard, Judson and C. F. Cleaveland for the state. Daggett, like Judson, was a colonizationist, "known to be hostile to the colored people, and a strenuous advocate of the Black Law". Daggett informed the jury that while the Constitution specified, in Article 4, Section 2, that "The Citizens of each State shall be entitled to all Privileges and Immunities of Citizens in the several States," "the persons contemplated in this Act [the Black Law] are not citizens". The jury rapidly returned a "guilty" verdict.

This was immediately appealed to the Connecticut Supreme Court (Court of Errors), and was argued on July 22, 1834. Attorneys were the same as previously. "All who attended the trial seemed to be deeply interested, and were made to acknowledge the vital importance of the question at issue." But "the Court evaded [a decision] ...by finding that the defects in the information prepared by the State’s Attorney were such that it ought to be quashed; thus rendering it 'unnecessary for the Court to come to any decision upon the question as to the constitutionality of the law.'" "They stretched to find, if not invented, a technical defect in order to avoid overruling Justice Daggett and deciding the substantive issues." "The court could not brave the storm of unpopularity by deciding in her favor and could not go on record as declaring an unconstitutional law as constitutional."

She continued to operate the school. She traveled to Philadelphia to explore relocating the school there, but was discouraged by locals because of recent anti-black violence there.

== School closed because of violence ==
When the legal measures did not close the school, townspeople shortly thereafter attempted unsuccessfully to set the building afire. Finally, on September 9, 1834, about midnight, a mob with heavy clubs and iron bars broke into the school and terrorized the students. "Five [windows] were destroyed, and more than ninety panes of glass were dashed to pieces."

Afraid for the safety of her students, on the advice of May Prudence closed the school and left Connecticut, never to live there again. Samuel May wrote that: "I felt ashamed of Canterbury, ashamed of Connecticut, ashamed of my country, ashamed of my color. Thus ended the generous, disinterested, philanthropic, Christian enterprise of Prudence Crandall."

== Impact ==
The events surrounding Prudence Crandall's school were widely reported. A letter from England of October 1833 calls Crandall "glorious", and the writer, Charles Stuart, says he is preparing "little parcels of presents" for the girls.

In addition to The Liberator, May, on the recommendation and with the funding of Arthur Tappan, began publishing in the county seat of Brooklyn, Connecticut, a newspaper, The Unionist, specifically to cover the situation.

The widely publicized episode was one of the first acts of antiabolitionist mobbing that hardened antislavery commitment and discredited colonization, the position that free blacks should be encouraged and helped to "return to Africa". But "its enduring significance lay in the impetus it gave to antislavery constitutional thought." The case raised issues concerning the rights of free Northern blacks, not Southern slaves; it avoided the debate surrounding slavery and raised the question of the rights of free blacks, finally settled in the Fourteenth Amendment.

Judson lost his 1834 bid for reelection to the Connecticut legislature, stunning his supporters and causing jubilation among abolitionists. Windham County became the most anti-slavery part of Connecticut.

== Notable students ==
- Sarah Harris Fayerweather
- Julia Williams

== Legacy ==
- A novel, The Canterbury Question, was published in 2014.
- Bondage : a drama of Prudence Crandall's Canterbury school was produced in 1936.

== See also ==
- Prudence Crandall Museum
- Sarah Mapps Douglass
- Trial of Reuben Crandall
- Noyes Academy, integrated and co-educational school in New Hampshire destroyed in mob attacks

== Documents ==
- A Canterbury Tale: A Document Package for Connecticut's Prudence Crandall Affair. Gilder Lehrman Center for the Study of Slavery, Resistance, and Abolition. April 22, 2015.
