= Canterbury Center Historic District =

Historic district in Connecticut, United States

- U.S. National Register of Historic Places
- U.S. Historic district
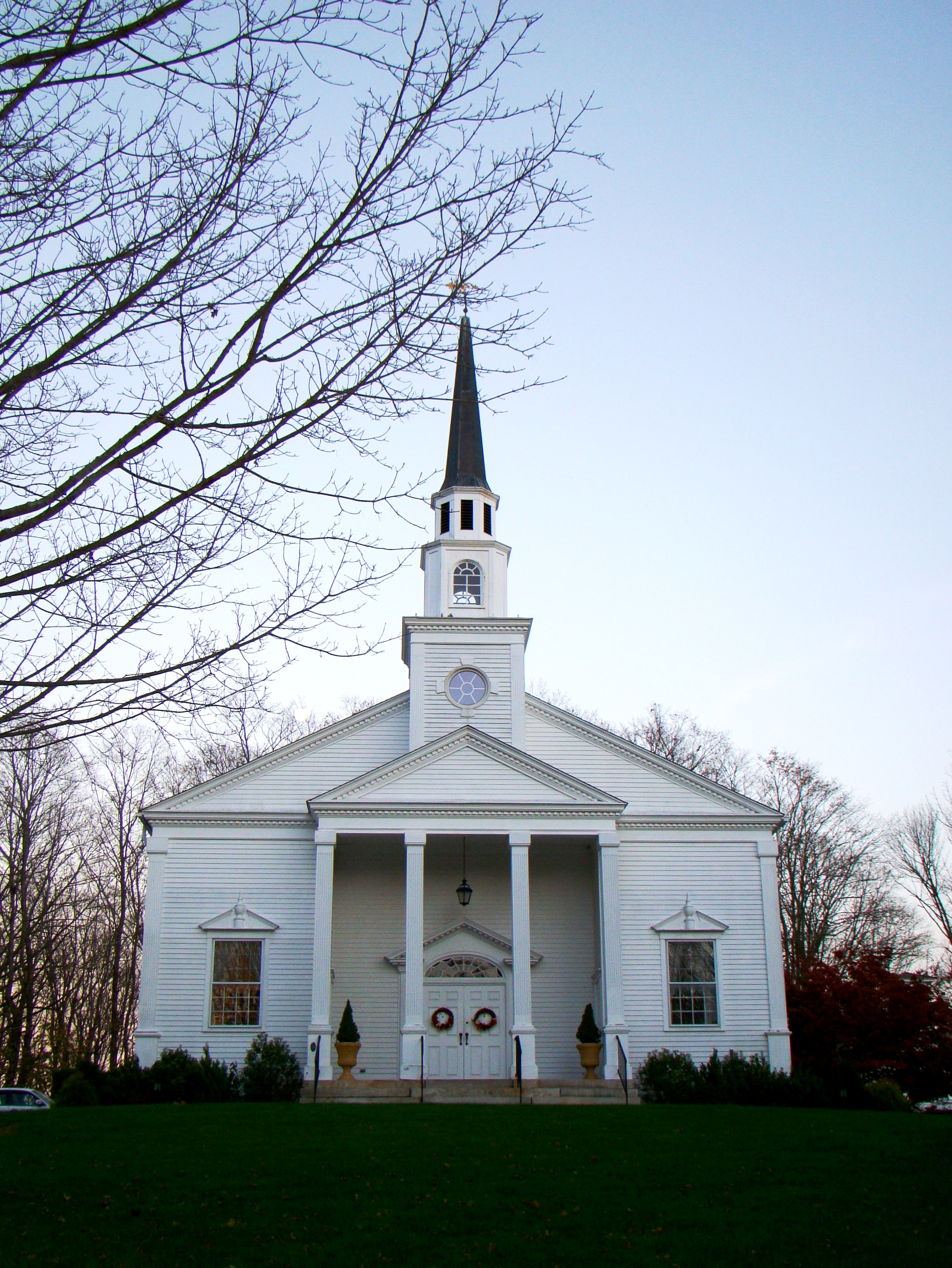
- Canterbury Center Historic District is anchored by the 1st Congregational Church

- Location within Connecticut Location within the United States
- Location: Roughly along Elmdale, Library, North Canterbury, South Canterbury, and Westminster Roads, Canterbury, Connecticut
- Coordinates: 41°42′6″N 71°58′22″W
- Area: 85 acres (34 ha)
- Architectural style: Colonial, Federal, Greek Revival, Victorian, Vernacular
- NRHP reference No.: 97001446
- Added to NRHP: April 10, 1998

The Canterbury Center Historic District is a historic district in Canterbury, Connecticut. The district is centered on the town green (Canterbury Green), located at the junction of Route 169 (North and South Canterbury Roads) and Route 14 (Westminster Road). It has been the town center since 1705, and includes a fine assortment of 18th and early 19th-century architecture. It was listed on the National Register of Historic Places (NRHP) in 1998.

== Description and history ==
The area that is now Canterbury was settled by English colonists around the turn of the 18th century, and was incorporated out of Plainfield in 1703. The town green was established on 3.5 acres (1.4 ha) of land purchased from Robert Green in 1705, for the purpose of erecting a meeting house, although a meeting house was not constructed until 1711. The present Congregational Church, a Federal Revival building built in the 1960s, stands on its site. The town's first cemetery, located just north of the green, was established about 1720. The town grew as a rural crossroads community, serving the local community and travelers on the two roads that intersect here. It was also the principal center of education in the town, with an early academy founded in the 1790s, and the groundbreaking school for African-American girls founded by Prudence Crandall in 1831. (The Prudence Crandall House, a National Historic Landmark, is now a museum standing in the district. The town's economic importance declined with the advent of the railroad (which bypassed it).

The historic district extends from the town green along the main roads. Most of the buildings in the district are residences, typically wood frame structures 1-1/2 or 2-1/2 stories in height. Almost all were built before about 1850, and are of Georgian Colonial, Federal, or Greek Revival style; there is only one house in the district in the later Italianate style. Non-residential buildings include two fraternal halls, a Grange hall and the Finnish Hall, and the library, which is housed a Greek Revival building that originally served as a one-room district schoolhouse. The 20th-century brick town hall, while not detracting from the historic character of the area, does not contribute to its historic significance.

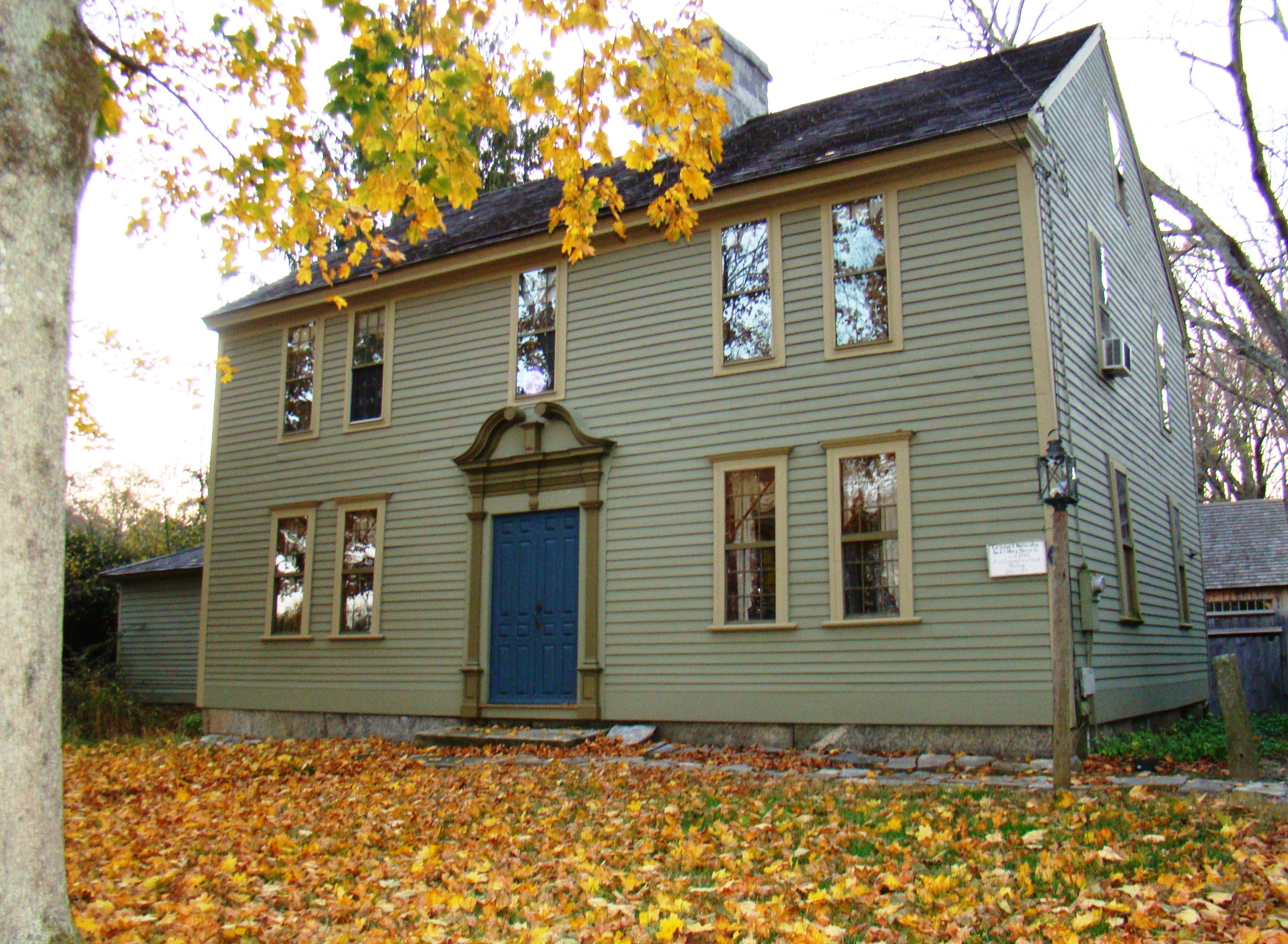
The David and Mary Nevins house, c. 1746, served as the parsonage for 1st Congregational Church on and off from the mid-19th century to the 1970s.

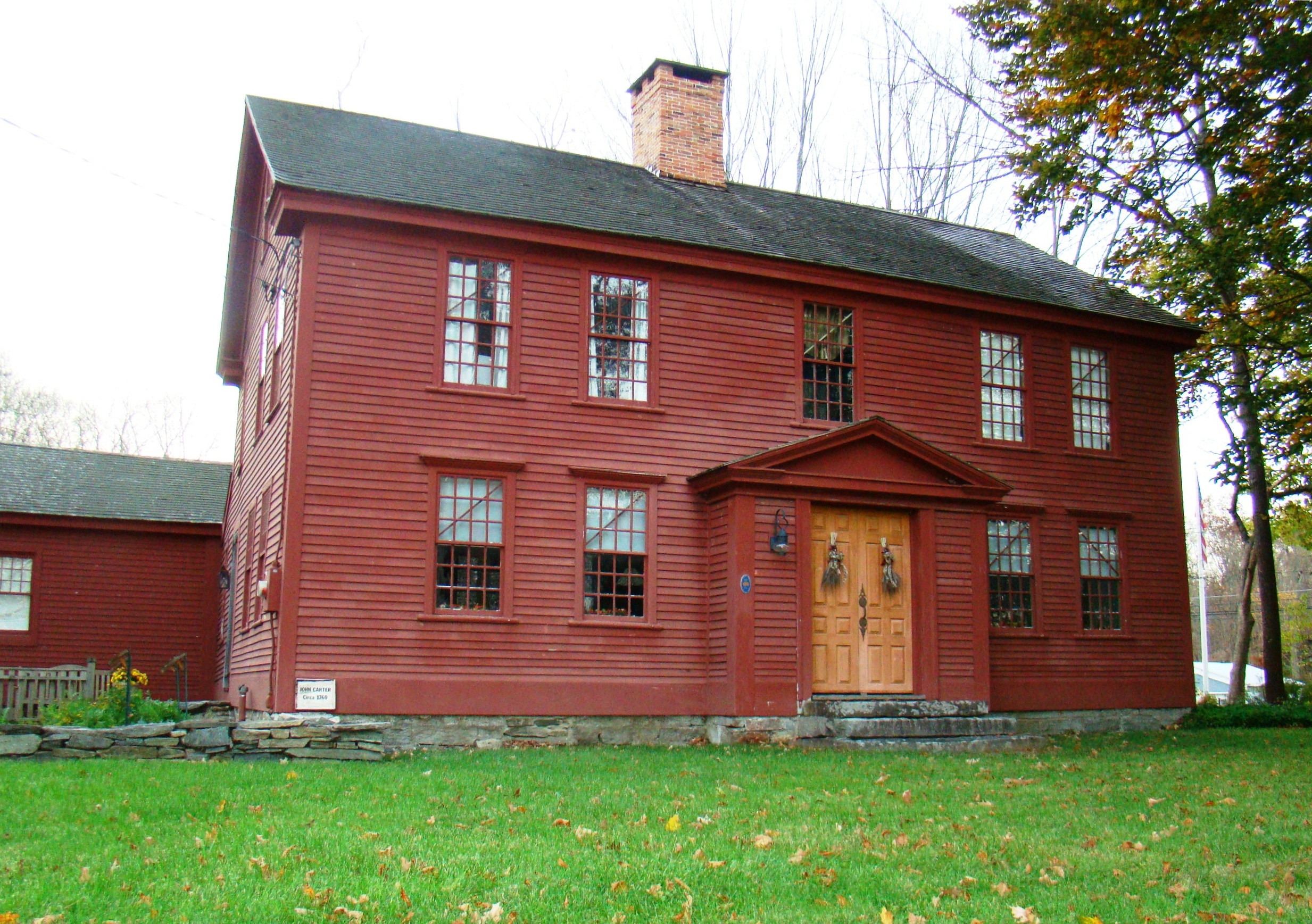
1760 John Carter House

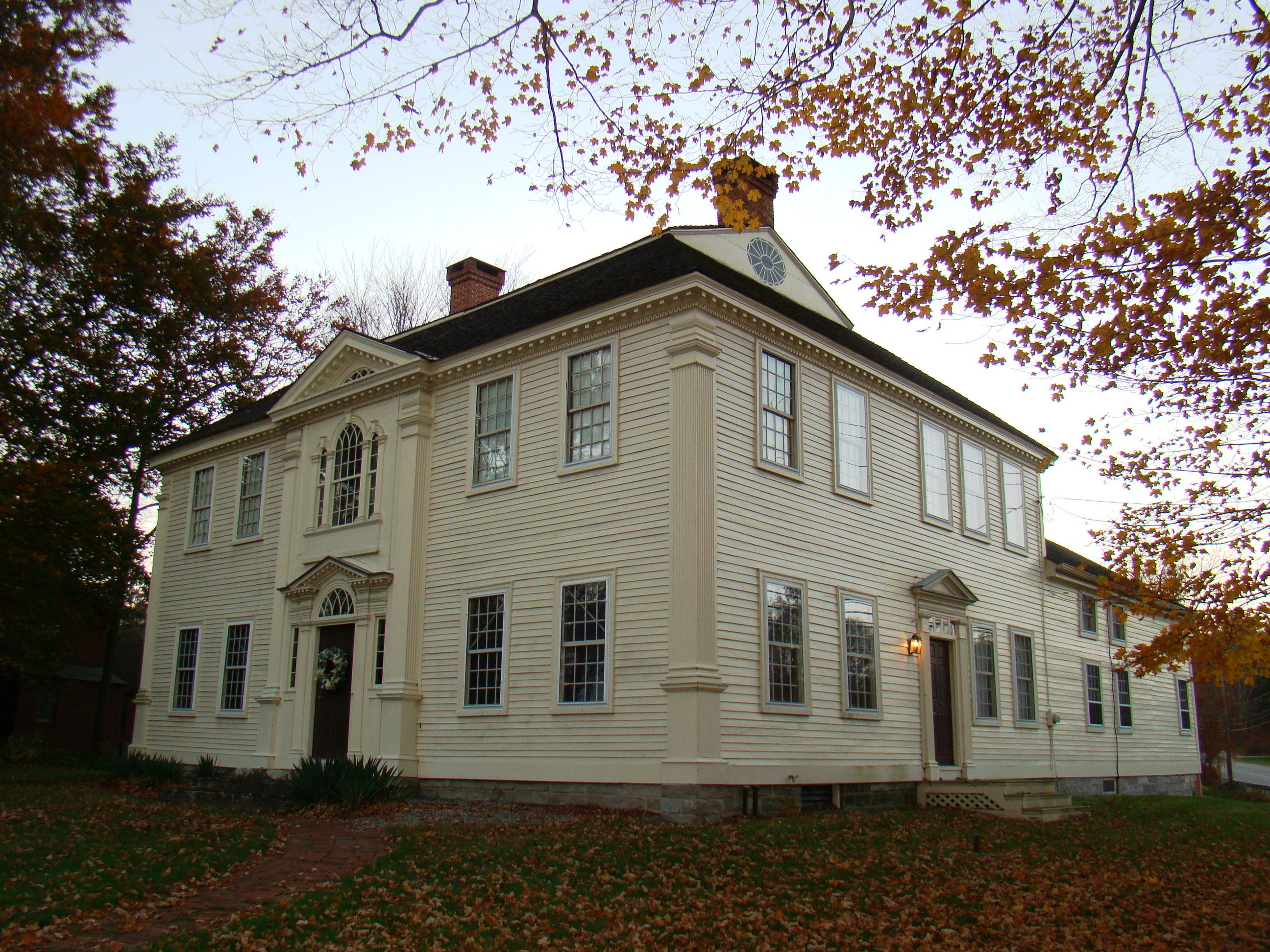
This 1805 Payne house would later raise controversy as the Prudence Crandell School for Negro Girls. Today it is a Connecticut State museum.

== See also ==
- National Register of Historic Places listings in Windham County, Connecticut
