= Ann Eliza Hammond =

African American student

Ann Eliza Hammond (born c. 1816) was an African American student from Providence, Rhode Island. She attended Prudence Crandall's Canterbury Female Boarding School and was subpoenaed and arrested in 1833 for vagrancy as a result of Connecticut opposition to the school's attempt at desegregation. Her father, Thomas Hammond, had died in 1826.
