= Trial of Reuben Crandall =

American abolitionist (1806–1838)

Reuben Crandall
- Born: January 6, 1806; Carpenter's Mills, Rhode Island
- Died: January 17, 1838 (aged 32); Kingston, Jamaica
- Education: Yale College
- Occupations: Physician and lecturer on botany
- Known for: Arrest, trial, and acquittal on sedition charges
- Relatives: Prudence Crandall, sister

Reuben Crandall (January 6, 1806 – January 17, 1838), younger brother of educator Prudence Crandall, was a physician who was arrested in Washington, D.C., on August 10, 1835, on charges of "seditious libel and inciting slaves and free blacks to revolt", the libels being abolitionist materials portraying American slavery as cruel and sinful. He was nearly killed by a mob that wanted to hang him, and avoided that fate only because the mayor called out the militia. The Snow Riot ensued. Although a jury would find him innocent of all charges, his very high bail meant he remained in the Washington jail for almost eight months, where he contracted tuberculosis. He died soon after his release.

This was the first trial for sedition in the United States. According to the Federal District Attorney Francis Scott Key, it was "one of the most important cases ever tried here." His incarceration, trial, and acquittal increased support for abolitionism, and considerable sympathy for him was expressed in the press. "His case is one of the most oppressive and unjust that ever occurred in this country", said the New York Evangelist, which called for a Congressional investigation.

== Biography ==
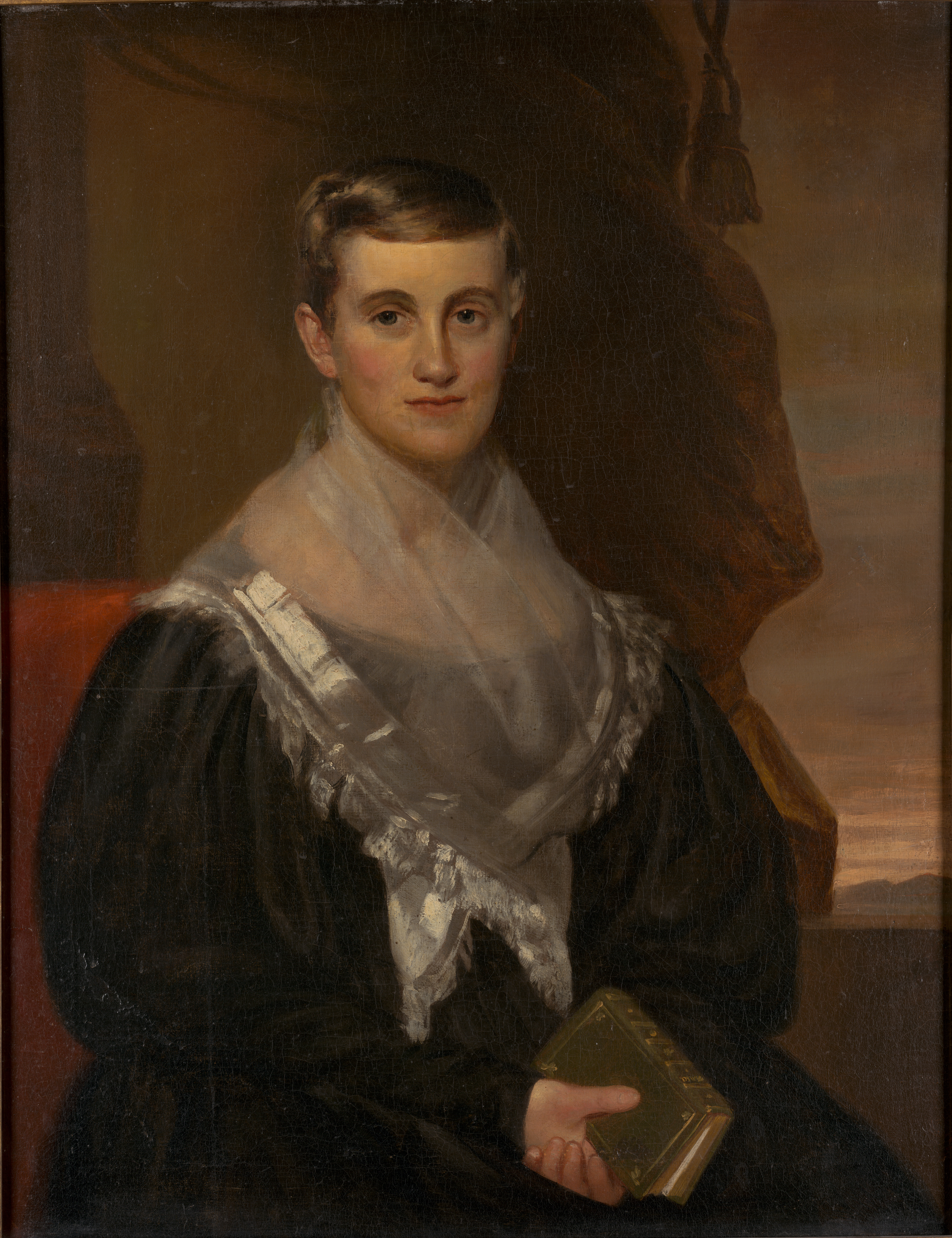
Portrait of Reuben Crandall's sister Prudence.

Crandall was born about 1805 to Pardon and Esther Carpenter Crandall, a Quaker couple who lived in Carpenter's Mills, Rhode Island. In addition to his older sister Prudence, he had a brother Hezekiah and a sister Almyra (died 1837). When he was about 8, his father moved the family to nearby Canterbury, Connecticut. He studied for a year at Yale College and then studied medicine under a doctor in Philadelphia. He moved to Peekskill, New York, where he practiced medicine for seven years. Unmarried, he was the secretary of the local temperance society.

He boarded with a Peekskill family, to whom he was also physician. Because of their medical problems, they asked Crandall to accompany them on a trip to Washington, D.C. After seeing Washington he decided that he wanted to stay, collected his belongings from Peekskill, and opened an office in Georgetown. However, illness soon made it impossible for him to continue as a physician and he soon was earning his living by giving lectures on his specialty, botany.

== Context ==
In 1835 the nation was in an uproar over slavery. Ever since Nat Turner's revolt in 1831, people in the slave states were very worried, even panicked, that more slave revolts were coming. At the same time (1831–1835), abolitionism grew dramatically from almost nothing to a mighty social movement. The American Anti-Slavery Society was founded in 1833, the same year that slavery ended in most of the British empire. Its leaders, including Wm. Lloyd Garrison and Gerrit Smith, denounced as cruel and ineffective the colonizationist project of sending free blacks to Africa. It began training a cadre of lecturers who carried the abolitionist message all over the North, leading to the foundation of multiple local anti-slavery groups in every Northern state; in 1835 alone these grew from 150 to 350. Anti-slavery meetings were the order of the day.

In July 1835, the American Anti-Slavery Society mailed over 175,000 pieces of abolitionist literature to every politician and community leader in the whole country whose name they could find. On July 25, Amos Dresser was publicly whipped in Nashville, Tennessee, for possessing abolitionist publications. The next day, July 26, the Noyes Academy in Canaan, New Hampshire, was physically destroyed for admitting Black students. On July 30, in a widely reported incident, there was a public burning of mailed abolitionist literature in Charleston, South Carolina, after it was seized by a mob that broke into the Post Office. Both President Andrew Jackson and the Postmaster General supported the Southern postmasters who refused to deliver such mail. By October Garrison had been burned in effigy, had a gallows erected in front of the office of his abolitionist newspaper The Liberator, and was saved from lynching only when the mayor of Boston locked him in the jail for his protection. Congress, flooded with thousands of abolitionist petitions, enacted the first of a series of gag rules.

== Arrest ==
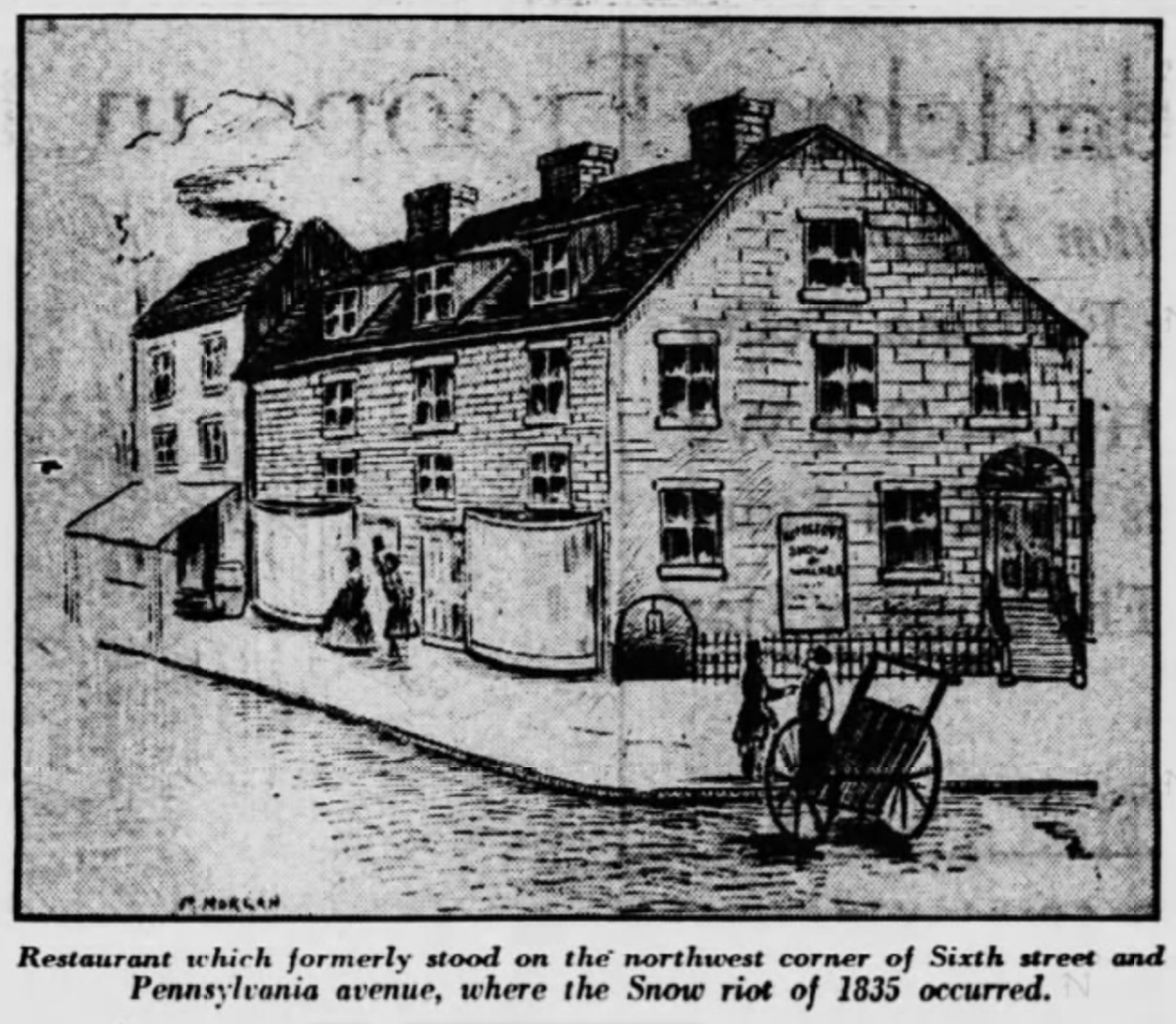
Beverly Snow's Epicurean Eating House, about 1835. The sign reads "Refectory Snow and Walkers".

Crandall was arrested on August 10, 1835, on a charge of "seditious libel and inciting slaves and free blacks to revolt". The city was already in an uproar, in an ugly mood; the city officials dared not even take him out of the jail to a courtroom for his arraignment, so a magistrate came to the jail. Afterwards a mob would have broken into the jail and lynched Crandall, but the mayor, William A. Bradley, called out the militia. (Another report says that the jail was protected by Marines from the Washington Navy Yard.) They surrounded City Hall, where the jail was located, and thus saved Crandall, but the rest of the city was left "virtually unprotected".

The mob, "denied a lynching", went looking for other victims. They assaulted the elegant restaurant owned by a free mulatto, Beverly Snow, destroying the furniture and drinking all of the restaurant's liquor. They then "vandalized several churches of free black congregations and burned a house of ill repute and some tenements inhabited by blacks.... Roving mobs continued to terrorize Washington's black neighborhoods through the rest of the week." The whole is known as the Snow Riot.

Crandall was initially denied bail. In January, at a bail hearing his attorneys were able to obtain, his bail was set at $5,000 (equivalent to $146,591 in 2025). He was unable to pay it, and so remained in jail.

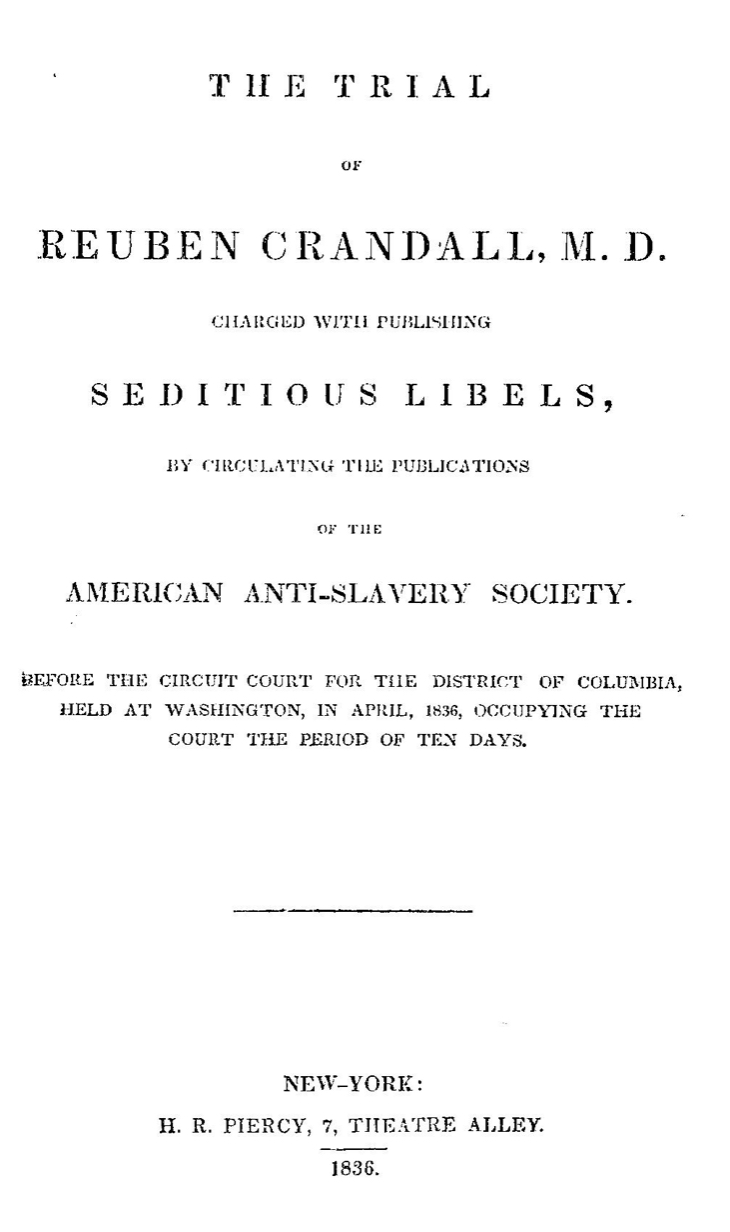

== Trial ==
The trial, reported on in United States v. Crandall, 25 Fed. Cas. 1684 (1836), began on April 15, 1836, and lasted ten days. "U.S. v. Reuben Crandall was the most sensational trial in Washington in years." There had never before been a trial for sedition anywhere in the United States. "The courtroom in City Hall was crowded. Several congressmen took front-row seats." There were three newspaper reporters.

The much smaller and quicker trial of Amos Dresser, arrested two weeks before Crandall and then publicly whipped in Nashville for possession of abolitionist literature, was little known outside of Tennessee. Unfortunately for Crandall, his trial was in the nation's capital, and like other events in Washington, D.C., it received national publicity. It was believed that finally, for the first time, someone (Key) had caught an abolitionist who was telling slaves to revolt (as John Brown intended to in 1859). This was the first trial in the country for Crandall's crime of "publishing malicious and wicked libels, with the intent to excite sedition and insurrection among the slaves and free colored people" (emphasis added), as the indictment said in its first sentence. Key wanted to blame the Snow Riot on Crandall and his "wicked libels", in which American slavery is portrayed as a nasty, cruel, and sinful system.

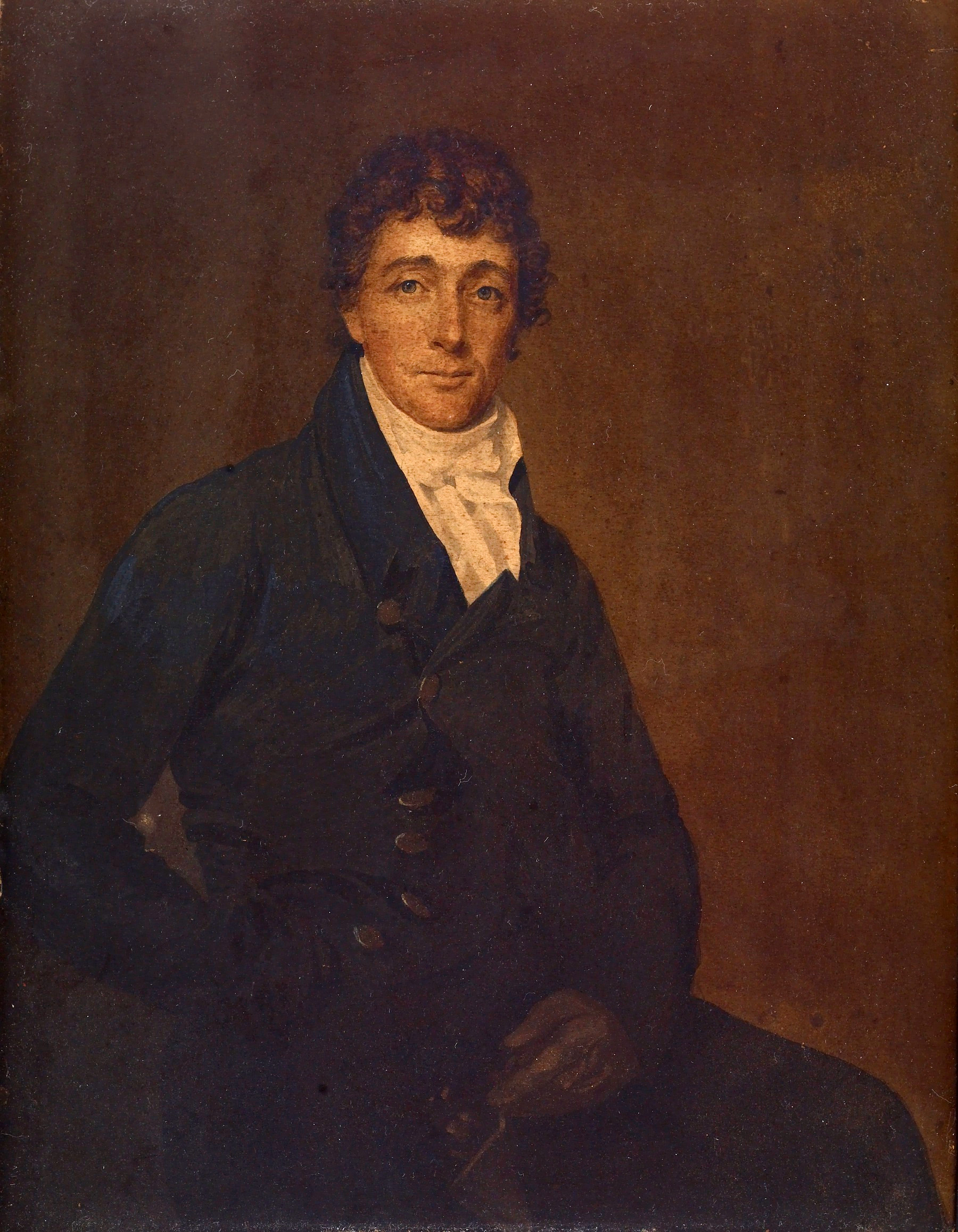
Francis Scott Key

Crandall, at the trial, was described in a newspaper as "quite pale, which is probably owing to a long confinement of eight months in our close and noisome prison."

Leading the prosecution was District of Columbia District Attorney Francis Scott Key, a slave owner and colonizationist. "Crandall was defended by two of Washington's most skillful attorneys, Richard Coxe and Joseph Bradley. These crafty barristers blocked Key at every turn."

The voluminous indictment, which Key drafted himself, had five counts. The first four described writings allegedly published by Crandall. The fifth count dealt with his distribution of the "libels" of the prior counts.

Impanelling a jury was prolonged, because many potential jurors knew about the case and had already reached a decision on Crandall's innocence or guilt.

=== The prosecution's case ===
The prosecutors alleged that Crandall not only possessed abolitionist publications, he had published (distributed) them with the intent of causing a rebellion among the slaves of the District of Columbia. The prosecution's part of the trial ended on April 22.

=== Defense ===
The defense attorneys pointed out that Crandall had only lent one copy of one item to someone who had asked for it, and that a single copy did not constitute publication, nor was possession the same as publication, as the prosecution had alleged. The materials in question had been used as packing material for his medical equipment, and the lady of the family in Peekskill testified that the publications had been sitting in her attic, and she herself used them in packing Dr. Crandall's belongings. A series of witnesses from the Peekskill vicinity, including the sheriff of Westchester County, testified that during the years Crandall lived in Peekskill he had not demonstrated the slightest interest in the slavery question. Furthermore, the prominent colonizationist Andrew T. Judson, who led the opposition to Prudence's school, testified that Reuben had actively opposed his sister's plan to operate a school for black girls. Finally, Reuben Crandall, who was no abolitionist, had been confused with Phineas Crandall, who was on the board of the American Anti-Slavery Society and had erroneously been stated to be from Peekskill.

The witnesses all noted that Crandall was a fine gentleman. According to a report in the Boston Courier, "his character stands clear and high above-board."

=== Outcome ===
After three hours, the jury delivered a stinging rebuke to Key, and acquitted Crandall without hesitation. The acquittal made headlines across the country. The Boston Courier reporter stated that "I believe there is a feeling in this community of sympathy for him, and regret for his eight months imprisonment. There is much to answer for somewhere." However, Crandall declined to sue for wrongful imprisonment, as his father had suggested.

For his safety Crandall voluntarily remained briefly in jail, until his friends could smuggle him out of town. He went to his parents' house in Connecticut, hoping to recover from the "consumption" (tuberculosis) that he had contracted in the jail. Late in 1836 he moved to Jamaica, hoping that the warm weather would aid his recovery. However, he died in Kingston, Jamaica, on January 17, 1838.

Key was no longer a presidential confidant. He "seemed to have lost his ambition".

== Pamphlets ==
Three pamphlets about the trial were published shortly after. Links are given below to a copy of each in the Internet Archive. They have also been reprinted in a collection of American pamphlets relating to slavery.

- A member of the bar [an attorney] (1836). The trial of Reuben Crandall, M.D. : charged with publishing and circulating seditious and incendiary papers, &c., in the District of Columbia, with the intent of exciting servile insurrection. Carefully reported, and compiled from the written statements of the courts and the council. Washington, D.C.
- The trial of Reuben Crandall, M.D. : charged with publishing seditious libels, by circulating the publications of the American Anti-Slavery Society, before the Circuit Court for the District of Columbia, held at Washington, in April, 1836, occupying the court the period of ten days. New York: H. R. Piercy. 1836.
- Key, Francis Scott (November 1836). "Mr. Key on the Colonization Society". African Repository and Colonial Journal. 12: 339–351.
  - Key, Francis Scott (1836). A part of a speech pronounced by Francis Scott Key, Esq. on the trial of Reuben Crandall, M.D. before the Circuit Court of the District of Columbia, at the March term thereof, 1836, on an indictment for publishing libels with intent to excite sedition and insurrection among the slaves and free coloured people of said district. Washington. Reproduces text from African Repository.
