= George Fayerweather =

American blacksmith and abolitionist

George Fayerweather III (c. 1802– 13 November 1869) was an American blacksmith and abolitionist. He was of mixed Narragansett and African descent from South Kingstown, Rhode Island, United States.

== Early life and education ==
Fayerweather was born to George Fayerweather, a blacksmith who built the 1820 Fayerweather homestead, and a Narragansett woman who was the descendant of a sachem. His father was descended from slaves freed after the American Revolutionary War.

== Work ==
Like their father, Fayerweather and his brother Solomon took up blacksmithing as a skilled trade, as did several of their descendants. It was a key position in a 19th-century village.

Fayerweather moved to Canterbury, Connecticut, where in 1833 he married Sarah Harris (1812–1878), a free black woman born in Norwich, Connecticut, to free parents. She was the first African-American girl admitted to Prudence Crandall's school in Canterbury. Several parents took their daughters out of the school, and it was closed under the notorious Connecticut Black Law of 1833.

Fayerweather and his family moved to Kingston in 1855 to the Fayerweather homestead; he followed his father and brother Solomon as the village blacksmith. Their residence became a center of anti-slavery activity in the community, and they entertained numerous famous abolitionists in their home.

Fayerwether died on 13 November 1869 in Kingston, and was buried at Old Fernwood Cemetery.
