= George Fayerweather Blacksmith Shop =

- U.S. National Register of Historic Places
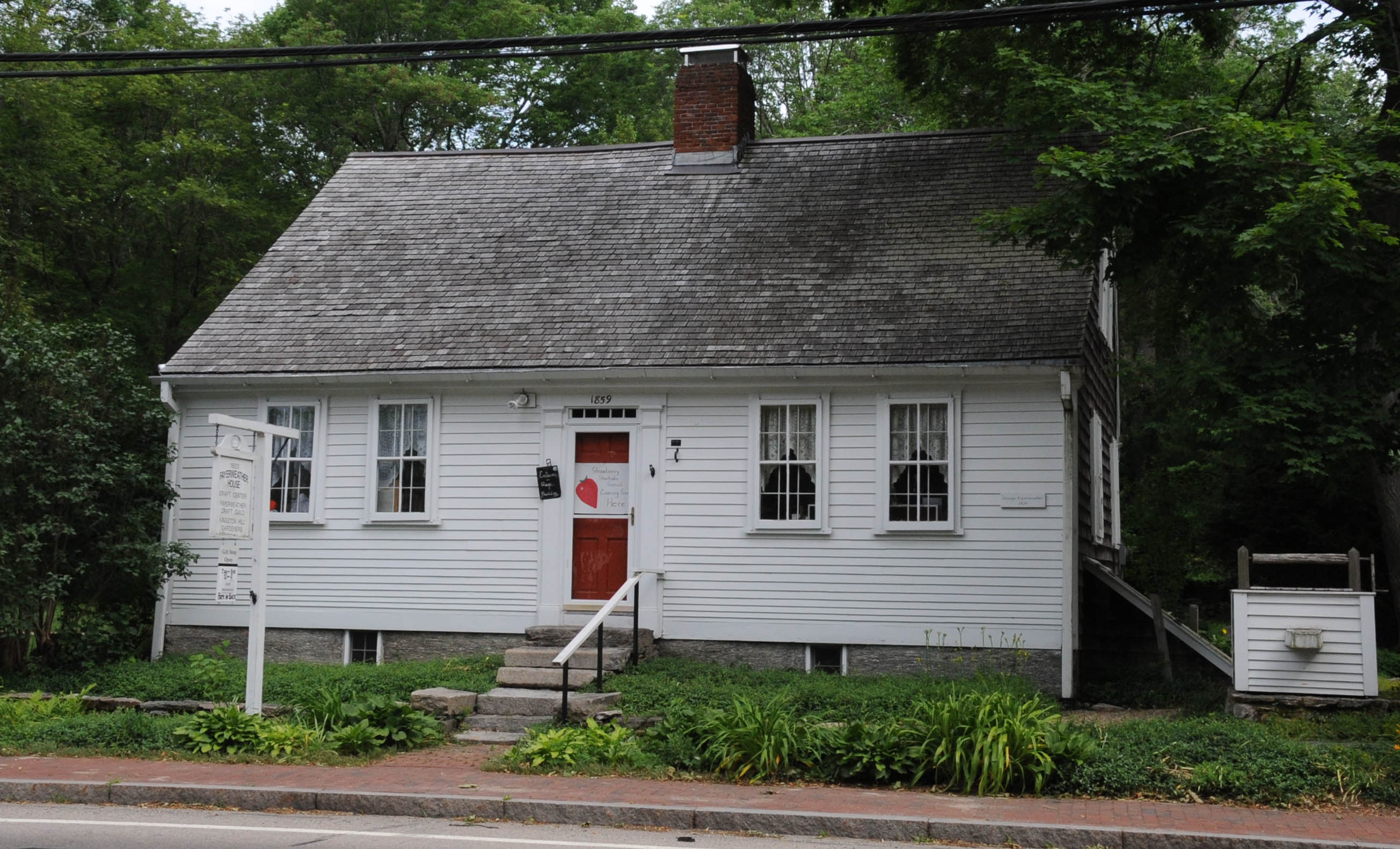
- Shop in 2016

- Location within Rhode Island Location within the United States
- Nearest city: Kingston, Rhode Island
- Coordinates: 41°28′49.35″N 71°31′12.66″W
- Built: 1820
- Architectural style: Cape Cod
- NRHP reference No.: 84000470
- Added to NRHP: November 29, 1984

The George Fayerweather Blacksmith Shop is an historic homestead and blacksmith shop at 1859 Mooresfield Road on the eastern outskirts of the Kingston Historic District in South Kingstown, Rhode Island. It was the home of George Fayerweather, an African-American blacksmith and his family, including his wife Sarah Harris Fayerweather. The shop was built in 1820 and was added to the National Register of Historic Places in 1984. The property is maintained by the Kingston Improvement Association, a non-profit organization of local residents, and is now the home of the Fayerweather Craft Guild and the Kingston Garden Club.

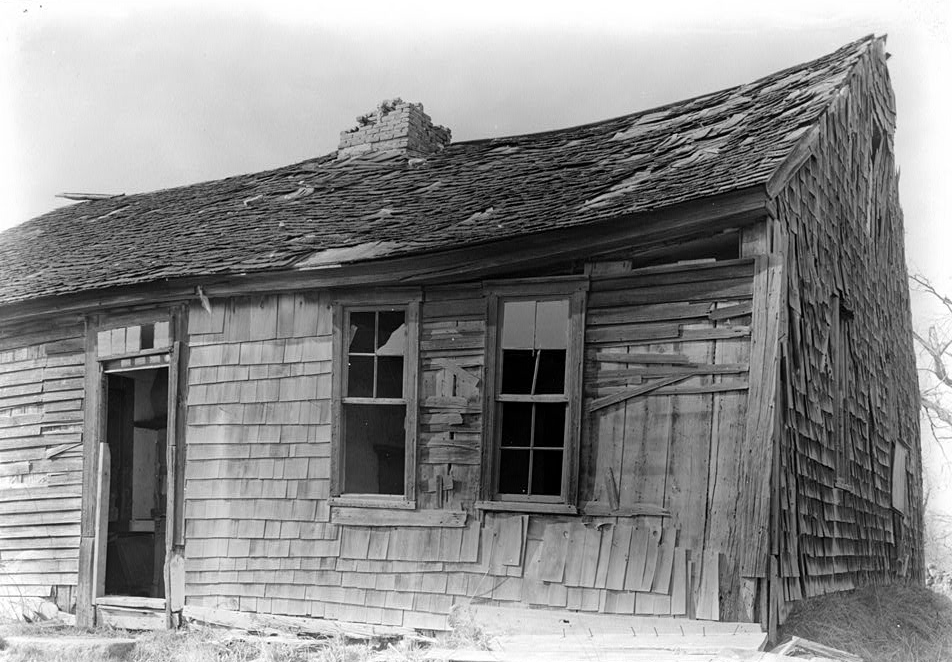
Fayerweather shop in 1940, before its restoration

== See also ==
- National Register of Historic Places listings in Washington County, Rhode Island
