= Sarah Harris Fayerweather =

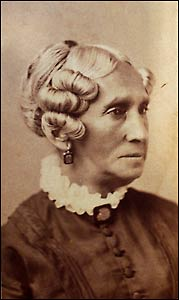

Sarah Harris Fayerweather (April 16, 1812 – November 16, 1878) was an African American activist, abolitionist, and school integrationist. Beginning in January 1833, at the age of twenty, she attended Prudence Crandall's Canterbury Female Boarding School in Canterbury, Connecticut, the first integrated school in the United States.

== Early life ==
Fayerweather was born Sarah Ann Major Harris on April 16, 1812, in Norwich, Connecticut. The daughter of William Monteflora Harris and Sally Prentice Harris, both of whom were free farmers, Fayerweather was of African and French West Indian descent and the second oldest of twelve children. Her father, William Harris, was a prominent advocate for civil rights in Norwich, Connecticut, who strongly believed that education was the key to social and economic progress. The Harris family first attended the Second Congregational Church of Norwich, a predominantly white congregation that openly sought out African Americans. The abolitionist movement was an important part of the church's services and activities. The family fully embraced this ideology, as seen not only in Sarah Harris’ activism later in life but in her father, William Harris, and eldest brother Charles, who served as agents for William Lloyd Garrison’s newspaper, The Liberator, distributing copies of the newsletter to folks throughout Canterbury, including Prudence Crandall.

In January 1832, the Harris family moved to Canterbury, Connecticut, where Sally Prentice Harris independently purchased sixty-four acres of land. Here, Sarah was raised in the Orthodox Congregational Church of Canterbury.

== Education ==
In September 1832, at the age of twenty, Fayerweather requested admission to the Canterbury Female Boarding School, an all-white girls school run by Prudence Crandall, a Quaker educator. In a letter to William Lloyd Garrison's newspaper, The Liberator, Crandall recalls Sarah's visit: "A colored girl of respectability – a professor of religion – and daughter of honorable parents, called on me sometime during the month of September last, and said in a very earnest manner, 'Miss Crandall, I want to get a little more learning, enough if possible to teach colored children, and if you will admit me into your school I shall forever be under the greatest obligation to you. If you think it will be the means of injuring you, I will not insist on the favor.'" After a brief deliberation, Crandall admitted her to the school as a day student. Sarah became the first African American girl to enter the academy, and Canterbury Boarding School became one of the first integrated schools in the United States. Crandall refused to expel her when the parents of most of the other attendees withdrew their daughters in response.

Faced with severe opposition from the Canterbury community, Crandall closed the existing school – only to reopen in 1833 in order to teach a group of solely young African American women. This led to the passage of Connecticut's "Black law," preventing out of state Black students from receiving an education. Sarah continued to attend the school in the face of harassment, legal troubles, and ostracization, including attempts to burn down the school. Eventually, Crandall, afraid for her pupils' safety after a mob converged on the school in September 1834, closed the school permanently.

== Family Life and Career ==
On November 28, 1833, Fayerweather married George Fayerweather Jr., a blacksmith ten years her senior. The couple moved to New London, Connecticut in 1841 before moving to Kingston, Rhode Island, in 1855 to raise their eight children.

Both Fayerweather and her husband supported abolitionism and racial equality. In 1849, her husband was a key member of the New Haven Colored Men's Convention as a representative for New London. Sarah Fayerweather joined the Kingston Anti-Slavery Society, attended anti-slavery meetings held by the American Anti-Slavery Society in various cities across the North, maintained a correspondence with her former teacher Prudence Crandall and former slave and abolitionist Frederick Douglass, and subscribed to The Liberator until Garrison ceased publishing it in 1865. Their home was a known stop for the underground railroad where they acted as conductors, providing food, shelter, and care to those escaping slavery.

Sarah maintained an active church life, becoming a teacher of the Sunday school at Kingston's Congregational church.

== Mary Harris Williams (1817-unknown) ==
Sarah Harris' younger sister, Mary A. Harris Williams, was born on September 29, 1817 in Norwich, CT. Mary was also a student at Crandall's Canterbury Boarding School when it was an academy for "little misses of color," enrolling when she was only sixteen years old. Like Fayerweather, Harris Williams became a notable educator and activist.

On April 19, 1845, Mary married her husband, Pelluman Williams, an African American teacher from Connecticut. Pelluman was the Vice President of the Connecticut Convention of Colored Men in 1849, advocating for Black suffrage and civil rights. Both Mary Harris Williams and her husband advocated for access to education for all African American people. In 1864, the Williams moved from New York City to New Orleans, Louisiana.

Four years later, in 1868, Harris Williams became a professor of English at Straight University alongside her husband, who was a principal there. At Straight University, Harris Williams helped educate newly freed enslaved people in the South. Straight University, is now known as Dillard University, a Historically Black college, founded after Straight University was burned down twice, once in 1877, and again in 1891.

While the date of Mary A. Harris Williams's death is not known, her legacy is still upheld through the institutions she once helped build and the continuation of her family's legacy throughout the state of Connecticut.

== Death ==
Surviving her husband by nine years, at the age of sixty-six, Fayerweather died on November 16, 1878, from swelling of the neck. She was buried in the Old Fernwood Cemetery in Kingston, Rhode Island.

== Legacy and honors ==
In 1970, Fayerweather Hall, a dormitory on the campus of University of Rhode Island, was named for Sarah Harris Fayerweather. The Fayerweather Craft Guild, located in Kingston at the site of the Fayerweather family's former home and blacksmith shop, was also named in her honor.
