= Prudence Crandall =

American civil rights pioneer (1803–1890)

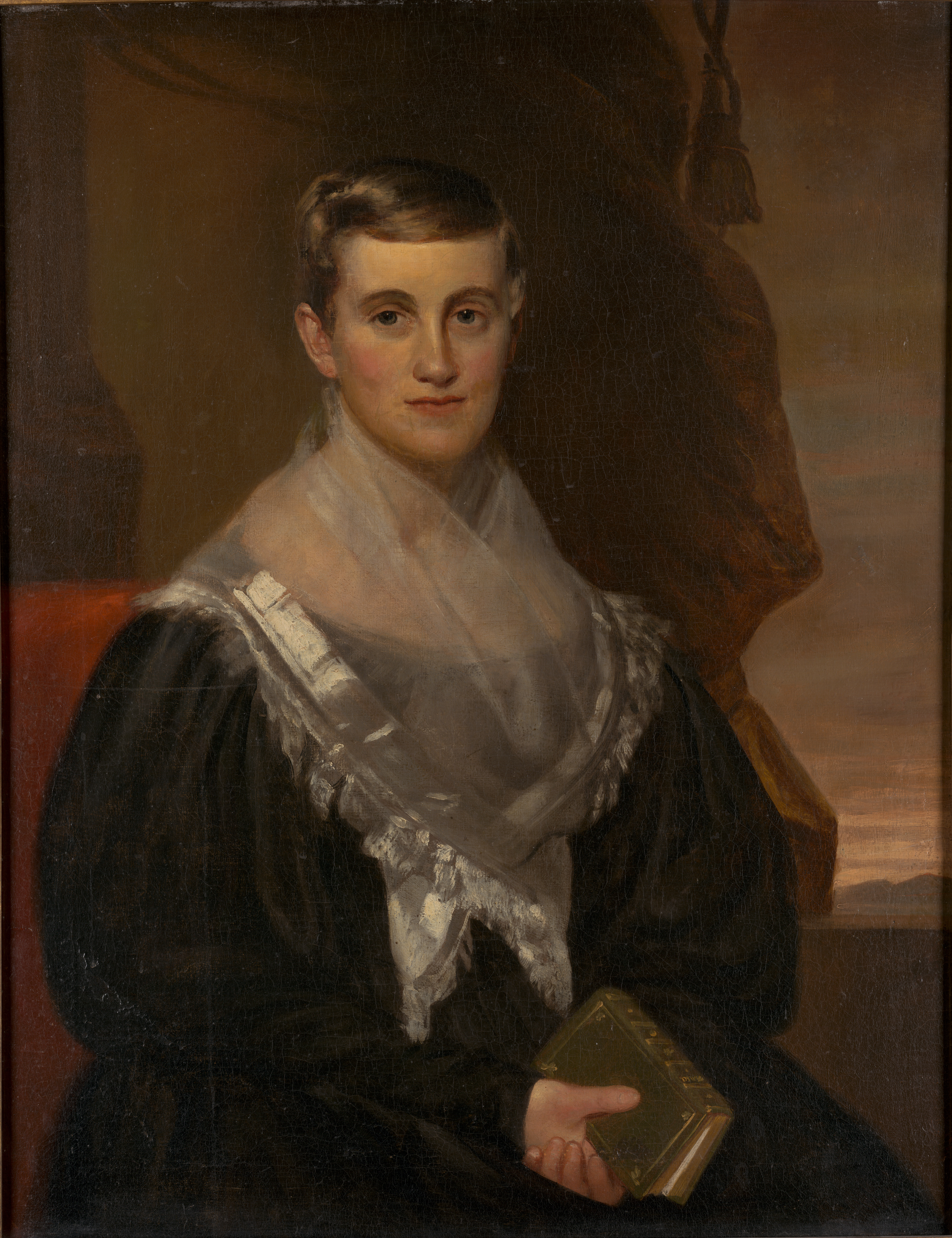
- Crandall, 1834 portrait by Francis Alexander
- Born: September 3, 1803; Carpenter's Mills, Rhode Island, U.S.
- Died: January 28, 1890 (aged 86); Elk Falls, Kansas, U.S.
- Occupation: Teacher
- Years active: 1830s
- Known for: Canterbury Female Boarding School
- Spouse: Calvin Philleo
- Awards: State heroine of Connecticut

Academic background
- Education: Black Hill Quaker School
- Alma mater: Moses Brown School

Academic work
- Institutions: Canterbury Female Boarding School
- Notable ideas: Black girls had the same right to education as white girls.

Prudence Crandall (September 3, 1803 – January 27, 1890) was an American schoolteacher and activist. She ran the Canterbury Female Boarding School in Canterbury, Connecticut, which became the first known school for African American girls ("young Ladies and little Misses of color") in the United States led by a white woman. She was the sister of Reuben Crandall, the defendant in the Trial of Reuben Crandall.

In 1832, when Crandall admitted Sarah Harris, a 20-year-old African American woman, to her school, she created what can be considered the first known integrated classroom in the United States. Following the decision, parents of white students began to withdraw their daughters. Rather than ask Sarah to leave, she decided that if white girls would not attend with the Black students, she would focus on educating African American girls to become teachers. She was arrested and spent a night in jail. Repeated trials for violating a Connecticut law, passed explicitly to make her work illegal, as well as violence from the townspeople, resulted in Crandall being unable to keep the school open safely. She left Connecticut and never lived there again.

Much later, the Connecticut legislature, with lobbying from Mark Twain, a resident of Hartford, passed a resolution honoring Crandall and providing her with a pension. She died a few years later, in 1890.

She was named the State Heroine of Connecticut by the Connecticut General Assembly in 1995.

== Early life ==
Prudence Crandall was born on September 3, 1803, to Pardon and Esther Carpenter Crandall, a Quaker couple who lived in Carpenter's Mills, Rhode Island, in the town of Hopkinton. She had two brothers, Reuben and Hezekiah, and a sister, Almira. When she was about 10, her father moved the family to nearby Canterbury, Connecticut. As her father thought little of the local public school, he paid for her to attend the Black Hill Quaker School in Plainfield, 5 miles (8 km) east of Canterbury. Her teacher, Rowland Greene, was opposed to slavery, and much later gave an address, published in William Lloyd Garrison's The Liberator, on the necessity of education for Black children and adults. In that address, he commended Isaac C. Glasgow for sending two of his daughters, "exemplary young women", to his former student's school.

Crandall attended the New England Yearly Meeting School, a Quaker boarding school in Providence, Rhode Island when she was 22. After graduating, she taught at a school in Plainfield. She became a Baptist in 1830.

== Canterbury Female Boarding School ==
=== Establishment ===
In 1831 she and her sister purchased the Elisha Payne house to establish the Canterbury Female Boarding School, at the request of Canterbury's elite residents, to educate young girls in the town. Together with the help of a maid, the two women taught about forty white girls in different subjects including geography, history, grammar, arithmetic, reading, writing, chemistry, astronomy, rhetoric, and French. As principal of the boarding school, Prudence Crandall was praised for her ability to educate young girls. The school flourished and was well received in the community.

=== Integration ===
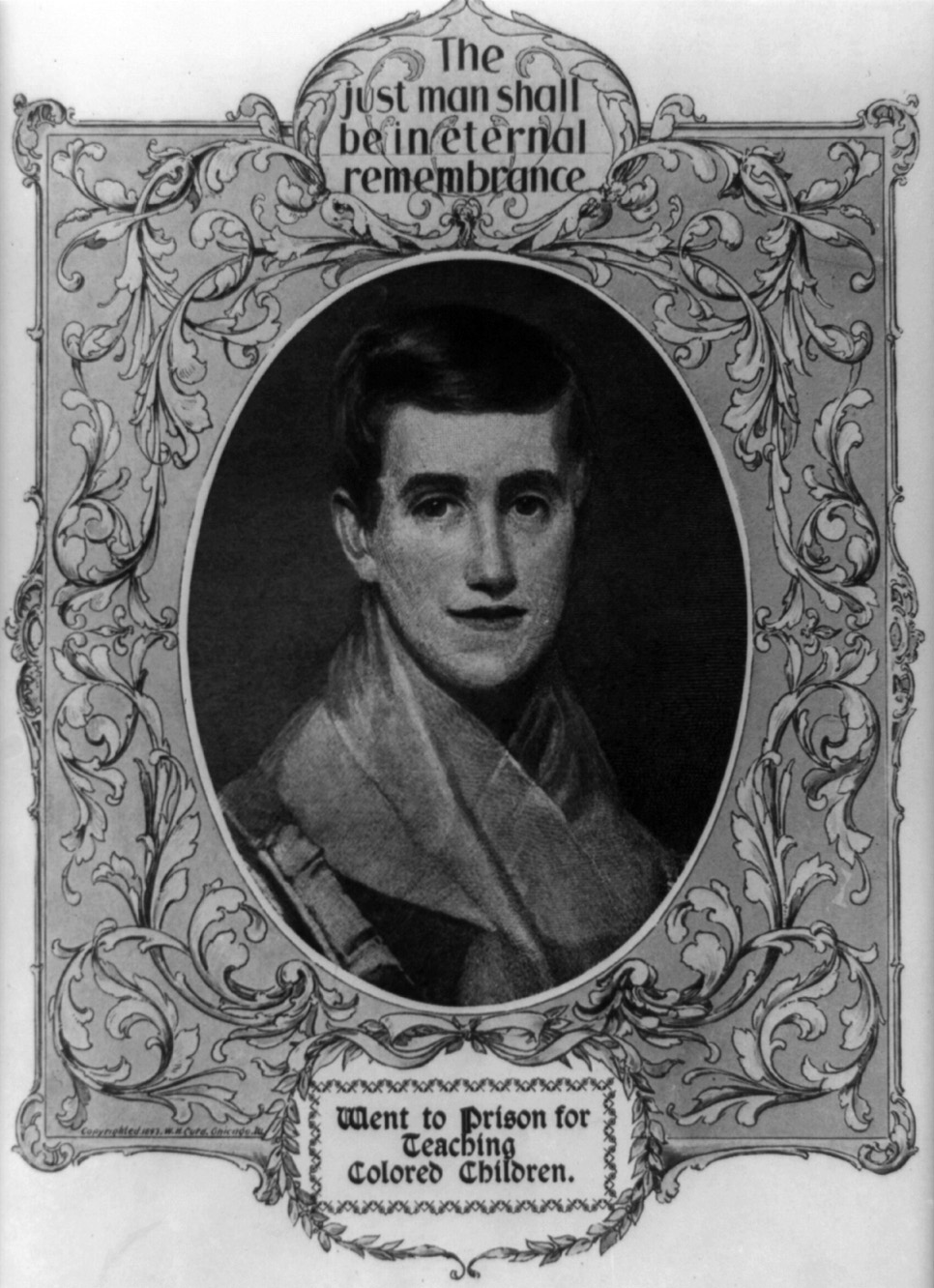
Prudence Crandall Went to Jail for Teaching Colored Students.

Although Prudence Crandall grew up as a North American Quaker, she admitted that she was not acquainted with many Black people or abolitionists. She learned of the hurdles white Americans created for Black adults and children through the abolitionist newspaper The Liberator, which she learned of through her housekeeper, "a young black lady", whose fiancé was the son of the paper's local agent. When discussing the impact of reading The Liberator, she shared that the articles and essays caused her to, "contemplate[d] for a while, the manner in which I might best serve the people of color."

An opportunity to take action came in the fall of 1832. Sarah Harris, the daughter of a free African American farmer near Canterbury, asked to be accepted to the school in order to prepare to be a teacher. Although Crandall was uncertain about whether to admit Harris, whom she liked, she consulted her Bible, which, as she told it, came open to Ecclesiastes 4:1:

So I returned, and considered all the oppressions that are done under the sun: and behold the tears of such as were oppressed, and they had no comforter; and on the side of their oppressors there was power; but they had no comforter. [King James translation; the same quotation is on the title page of Charles Crawford's Observations upon Negro-slavery, 1790]

She then admitted Sarah, establishing what is considered to be the first integrated school in the United States. Prominent townspeople objected and placed pressure on Crandall to dismiss Harris from the school, but she refused. Although the white students in the school did not openly oppose Sarah's presence, families of the current white students removed their daughters from the school.

After traveling to Boston to consult with abolitionists Samuel J. May and William Lloyd Garrison about the project, Crandall doubled-down and devoted herself to teaching African American girls. May and Garrison were supportive, and gave her letters of introduction to prominent African Americans across the Northeast. She temporarily closed the school and began directly recruiting girls and young women of color. On March 2, 1833, Garrison published advertisements for new pupils in his newspaper The Liberator. Crandall announced that on the first Monday of April 1833, she would open a school "for the reception of young Ladies and little Misses of color, ... Terms, $25 per quarter, one half paid in advance." Her references included leading abolitionists Arthur Tappan, May, and Garrison.

As word of the school spread, African American families began arranging enrollment of their daughters in Crandall's academy. On April 1, 1833, twenty African American girls from Boston, Providence, New York, Philadelphia, and the surrounding areas in Connecticut arrived at Miss Crandall's School for Young Ladies and Little Misses of Color.

== Public backlash ==
Leading the opposition to Crandall's school for Black girls was her neighbor Andrew Judson, an attorney and Canterbury's leading politician, having represented it in both the Connecticut House and Senate, and would soon be Connecticut's at-large member of the U.S. House of Representatives. In the national debate that was awkwardly taking place over "what to do" with the freed or soon-to-be-freed slaves, Judson supported "colonization": sending them to (not "back to") Africa (see American Colonization Society). He said: "We are not merely opposed to the establishment of that school in Canterbury; we mean there shall not be such a school set up anywhere in our State. The colored people can never rise from their menial condition in our country; they ought not to be permitted to rise here. They are an inferior race of beings, and never call or ought to be recognized as the equals of the whites." He predicted the destruction of the town if Crandall's school for colored children succeeded.

In response to the new school, a committee of four prominent white men in the town, Rufus Adams, Daniel Frost Jr., Andrew Harris, and Richard Fenner, attempted to convince Crandall that her school for young women of color would be detrimental to the safety of the white people Canterbury. Frost claimed that the boarding school would encourage "social equality and intermarriage of whites and blacks." To this, her response was "Moses had a black wife."

Samuel J. May's pamphlet protesting Andrew T. Judson's and others unjust treatment of Crandall and her school for "Colored" females

At first, citizens of Canterbury protested the school and then held town meetings "to devise and adopt such measures as would effectually avert the nuisance, or speedily abate it." The town response escalated into warnings, threats, and acts of violence against the school. Crandall was faced with great local opposition, and her detractors had no plans to back down.

On May 24, 1833, the Connecticut legislature passed a "Black Law", which prohibited a school from teaching African American students from outside the state without town permission. In July, Crandall was arrested and placed in the county jail for one night—she refused to be bonded out, as she wished the public to know she was being jailed. (A Vermont newspaper reported it under the headline "Shame on Connecticut".) The next day she was released under bond to await her trial.

Under the Black Law, the townspeople refused any amenities to the students or Crandall, closing their shops and meeting houses to them, although they were welcomed at Prudence's Baptist church in neighboring Plainfield. Stage drivers refused to provide them with transportation, and the town doctors refused to treat them. Townspeople poisoned the school's well—its only water source—with animal feces, and prevented Crandall from obtaining water from other sources. Not only did Crandall and her students suffer from the backlash, her father was insulted and threatened by the citizens of Canterbury. Crandall continued to teach the young women of color, which angered the community even further.

The white adults also focused their anger on Crandall's students. Ann Eliza Hammond, a 17-year-old student, was arrested; however, with the help of local abolitionist Samuel J. May, she was able to post a bail bond. Some $10,000 was raised through collections and donations.

== Judicial proceedings ==
Arthur Tappan of New York, a prominent abolitionist, donated $10,000 to hire the best lawyers to defend Crandall throughout her trials. The first opened at the Windham County Court on August 23, 1833. The case challenged the constitutionality of the Connecticut law prohibiting the education of African Americans from outside the state.

The defense argued that African Americans were citizens in other states, so, therefore, there was no reason why they should not be considered as such in Connecticut. Thus, they focused on the deprivation of the rights of African American students under the United States Constitution. By contrast, the prosecution denied the fact that freed African Americans were citizens in any state. The county court jury ultimately failed to reach a decision.

A second trial in Superior Court decided against the school, and the case was taken to the Supreme Court of Errors (now called the Connecticut Supreme Court) on appeal in July 1834. The Connecticut high court reversed the decision of the lower court, dismissing the case on July 22 because of a procedural defect. The Black Law prohibited the education of Black children from outside of Connecticut unless permission was granted by the local civil authority and town selectmen. But the prosecution's information that charged Crandall had not alleged that she had established her school without the permission of the civil authority and selectmen of Canterbury. Therefore, the Supreme Court held that the information was fatally defective because the conduct which it alleged did not constitute a crime. The Court did not address the issue of whether the citizenship of free African Americans had to be recognized in every state.

The school continued to operate during the various trials but the residents of Canterbury were so angry that the court had dismissed the case, that vandals set the school on fire in January 1834. Their efforts to destroy the school were unsuccessful. On September 9, 1834, a group of townspeople broke almost ninety window glass panes using heavy iron bars. For the safety of her students, her family and herself, Prudence Crandall closed her school on September 10, 1834.

Connecticut officially repealed the Black Law in 1838.

== Later years ==
At the suggestion of William Garrison, who raised the money from "various antislavery societies", Francis Alexander painted a portrait of Crandall in April 1834. She had to go to Boston for the sittings, where she "became the center of attention at abolitionist parties and gatherings each evening. The Boston abolitionists honored her as a true heroine of the antislavery cause."

In August 1834, Crandall married the Rev. Calvin Philleo, a Baptist minister in Canterbury, Connecticut. The couple moved to Massachusetts for a period of time after they fled the town of Canterbury, and they also lived in New York, Rhode Island, and Illinois. Crandall was involved in the women's suffrage movement and ran a school in LaSalle County, Illinois. She separated from Philleo in 1842 after his "deteriorating physical and mental health" led him to be abusive. He died in Illinois in 1874.

After the death of her husband, Crandall relocated with her brother Hezekiah to Elk Falls, Kansas, around 1877. Hezekiah died in 1881. A visitor of 1886, who described her as "of almost national renown," with "a host of good books in her house", quoted her as follows:

My whole life has been one of opposition. I never could find anyone near me to agree with me. Even my husband opposed me, more than anyone. He would not let me read the books that he himself read, but I did read them. I read all sides, and searched for the truth whether it was in science, religion, or humanity. I sometimes think I would like to live somewhere else. Here, in Elk Falls, there is nothing for my soul to feed upon. Nothing, unless it comes from abroad in the shape of books, newspapers, and so on. There is no public library, and there are but one or two persons in the place that I can converse with profitably for any length of time. No one visits me, and I begin to think they are afraid of me. I think the ministers are afraid I shall upset their religious beliefs, and advise the members of their congregation not to call on me, but I don't care. I speak on spiritualism sometimes, but more on temperance, and am a self-appointed member of the International Arbitration League. I don't want to die yet. I want to live long enough to see some of these reforms consummated.

In 1886, the state of Connecticut honored Prudence Crandall with an act by the legislature, prominently supported by the writer Mark Twain, providing her with a $400 annual pension (equivalent to $14,300 in 2025). Prudence Crandall died in Kansas on January 28, 1890, at the age of 86. She and her brother Hezekiah are buried in Elk Falls Cemetery.

== Legacy ==
=== 19th century ===
- An oil portrait of her by Francis Alexander was commissioned by her supporters in 1834. It is at Cornell University. A printed copy is in the Prudence Crandall Museum.
- The Glasgow Emancipation Society prepared the following piece of silver plate, which a traveler to the U.S. was going to take to her:
To

MlSS CRANDALL,
of Canterbury, Connecticut,
This small offering is presented,
With affectionate respect,
by
Female Friends in Glasgow;

In testimony of their high admiration of that ardent benevolence, heroic fortitude, and unflinching steadfastness,
In the midst of wanton and unequalled persecution,
Which Almighty God hath enabled her to display,
In her disinterested and noble endeavors,
Destined to be crowned with honor and triumph,
To introduce into the privileges, and elevate in the scale,
Of social and religious life,
A long injured class of Her beloved Countrywomen.
"Blessed are the merciful, for they shall obtain mercy. Blessed are ye when men shall revile you and persecute you,
and shall say all manner of evil against you falsely for my sake.
Rejoice and be exceeding glad, for great is your reward in heaven."
Glasgow, February 1834.

=== 20th century ===
In the late 20th century, Crandall received renewed attention and honors:

- On February 21, 1965, the NBC television series Profiles in Courage broadcast an episode about her.
- The Prudence Crandall House in Canterbury was acquired by the State of Connecticut in 1969. Now a Connecticut state museum, it was declared a National Historic Landmark in 1991.
- In 1973, the Prudence Crandall Center for Women, since 2003 the Prudence Crandall Center, Inc., was founded in New Britain, Connecticut, to provide shelter for victims of domestic violence.
- Crandall was the subject of a Walt Disney/NBC television movie entitled She Stood Alone (1991), in which she was portrayed by actress Mare Winningham.
- In 1994 Crandall was inducted into the Connecticut Women's Hall of Fame.
- In 1995, the Connecticut General Assembly designated Prudence Crandall as the state's official heroine.
- The Prudence Crandall Elementary School in Enfield, Connecticut, opened in 1966.
- In 2001 Crandall was inducted into the Rhode Island Heritage Hall of Fame.
- In 2008, a statue of Crandall and a pupil was erected at the Connecticut State Capitol.

== Historical marker ==
The following marker is at Osage Street and U.S. Route 160, Elk Falls, Kansas:

In 1831, Prudence Crandall, educator, emancipator, and human rights advocate, established a school which in 1833 became the first Black female academy in New England at Canterbury, Connecticut. This later action resulted in her arrest and imprisonment for violating the "Black Law."

Although she was later released on a technicality, the school was forced to close after being harassed and attacked by a mob. She moved with her husband Reverend Calvin Philleo to Illinois.

After her husband died in 1874, she and her brother moved to a farm near Elk Falls. Prudence taught throughout her long life and was an outspoken champion for equality of education and the rights of women. In 1886, supported by Mark Twain and others, an annuity was granted to her by the Connecticut Legislature. She purchased a house in Elk Falls where she died January 27, 1890.

Over a hundred years later, legal arguments used by her 1834 trial attorneys were submitted to the Supreme Court during their consideration of the historic civil rights case Brown v. Board of Education of Topeka, Kansas.

== Archival material ==
The Linda Lear Center for Special Collections & Archives, at Connecticut College, in New London, Connecticut, has a Prudence Crandall Collection. It contains "23 letters and one manuscript of poems by Crandall, including three letters to the abolitionist Simeon Jocelyn detailing the opposition to her school. Most of the remaining letters are to her husband, Calvin Philleo. There are also nearly three dozen manuscripts of correspondence and business records to and about Philleo. The remainder of the collection consists of photographs of Crandall, her family members, and their places of residence and Helen Sellers' research materials and correspondence related to her biography." The Lear Center has also posted a guide to other archival material of or relating to Crandall.

Correspondence with William Garrison is in his papers in the Boston Public Library.
