= Prudence Crandall Museum =

Historic house in Connecticut, United States

- Prudence Crandall House
- U.S. National Register of Historic Places
- U.S. National Historic Landmark
- U.S. Historic district – Contributing property
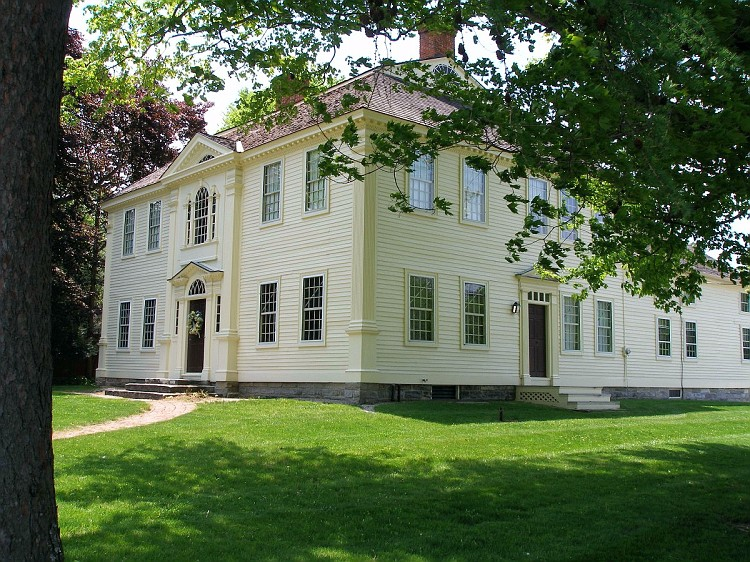

- Location within Connecticut Location within the United States
- Location: 1 South Canterbury Road, Canterbury, Connecticut
- Coordinates: 41°41′52.5″N 71°58′19″W
- Built: 1805
- Architectural style: Early Republic
- Part of: Canterbury Center Historic District (ID97001446)
- NRHP reference No.: 70000696

Significant dates
- Added to NRHP: October 22, 1970
- Designated NHL: July 17, 1991
- Designated CP: April 10, 1998

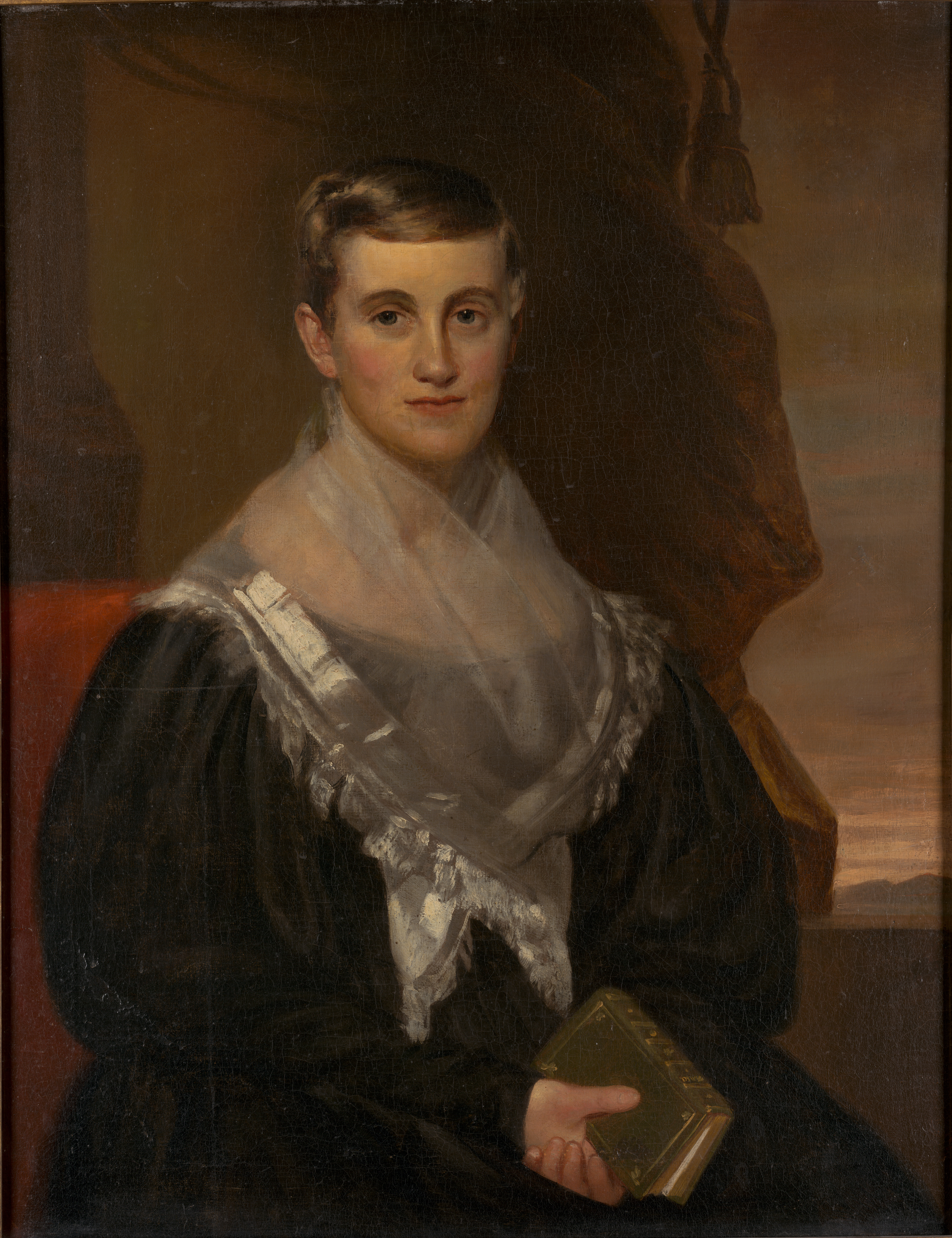
Prudence Crandall, portrait by Francis Alexander, 1834. In the Museum is a full-size, painted copy of this portrait, the original of which is in the Cornell University Library.

The Prudence Crandall Museum is a historic house museum, sometimes called the Elisha Payne House for its previous owner. It is located on the southwest corner of the junction of Connecticut Routes 14 and 169, on the Canterbury, Connecticut village green. It is designated a U.S. National Historic Landmark as Prudence Crandall House.

== The Canterbury Female Boarding School ==
The house is notable for having been the site of Prudence Crandall's Canterbury Female Boarding School. The house was empty and for sale in 1831, and Crandall purchased the house for a $500 down payment plus a $1500 mortgage. The school operated from 1831 to 1833 for white students, but the admission of one black student, by all reports highly qualified, caused parents of the white students to withdraw their daughters, threatening the school's survival. Crandall closed the school and reopened it in 1833 for African-American students, whom she called "young Ladies and little Misses of color". The school was vigorously opposed by the residents of Canterbury, who feared an African-American migration. When their attempts to close it through legal methods were not immediately successful, they resorted to violence, forcing Crandall to close the school in 1834 out of concern for the students' safety. Crandall left Connecticut, never to return. For her vision and brave actions at this school, Prudence Crandall is Connecticut's official state heroine. The house was designated a National Historic Landmark in 1991.

== Construction and architecture ==
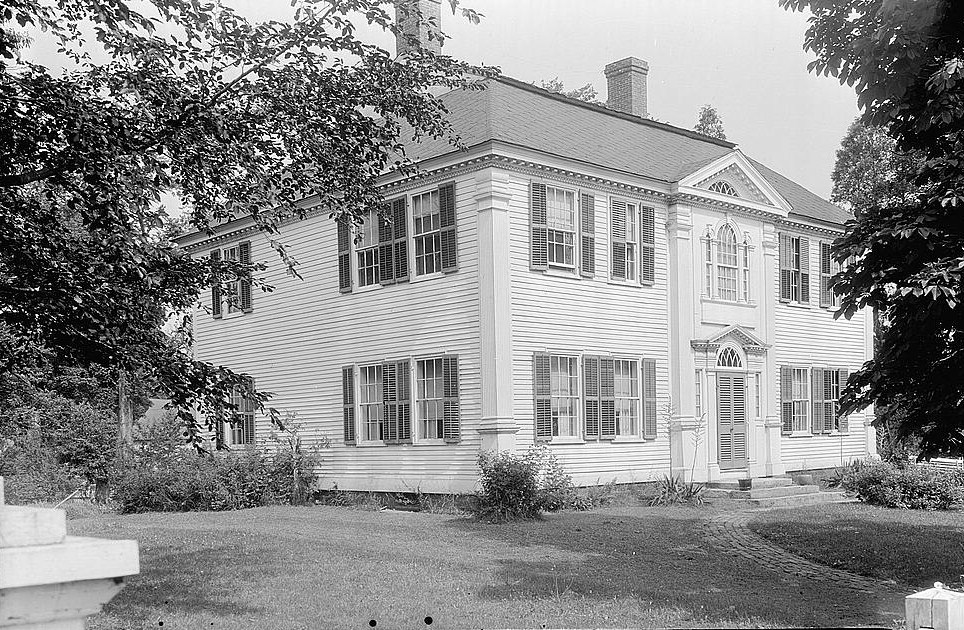
Hipped roof, with higher, set-back end gable barely visible behind obscuring tree branches, leading to chimney. Note corner pilasters.

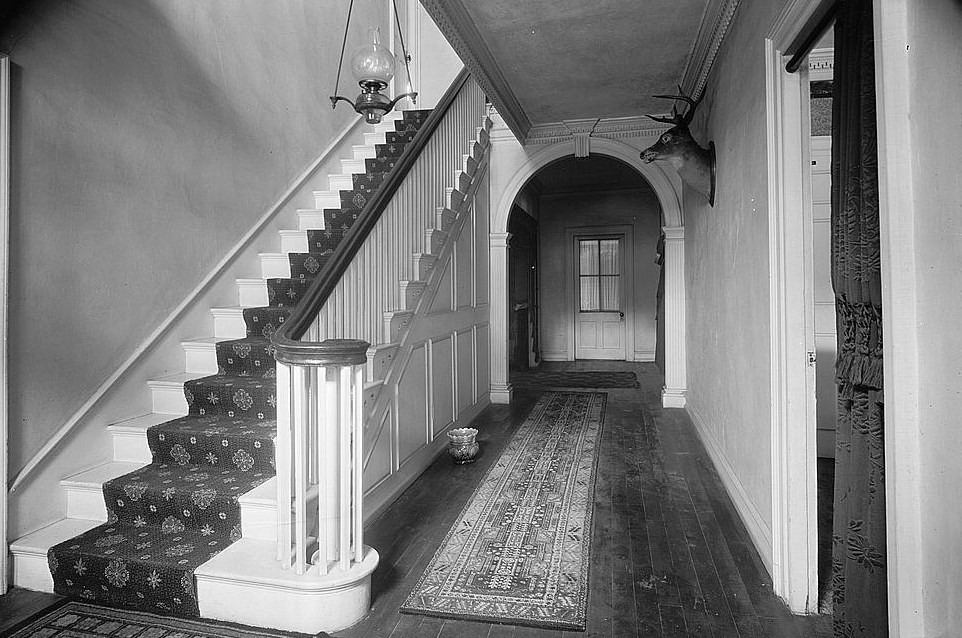
Interior, in 1940

The house was built in 1805, and "is a notable example of what has been termed the 'Canterbury type' because of several similar examples in the vicinity. It shows the peculiar roof form of gable on hip with twin chimneys, a triangular pediment at the eaves above a projecting pavilion at center of the facade, which carries a Palladian window lighting the stair hall at second floor level and an elaborate entrance doorway."

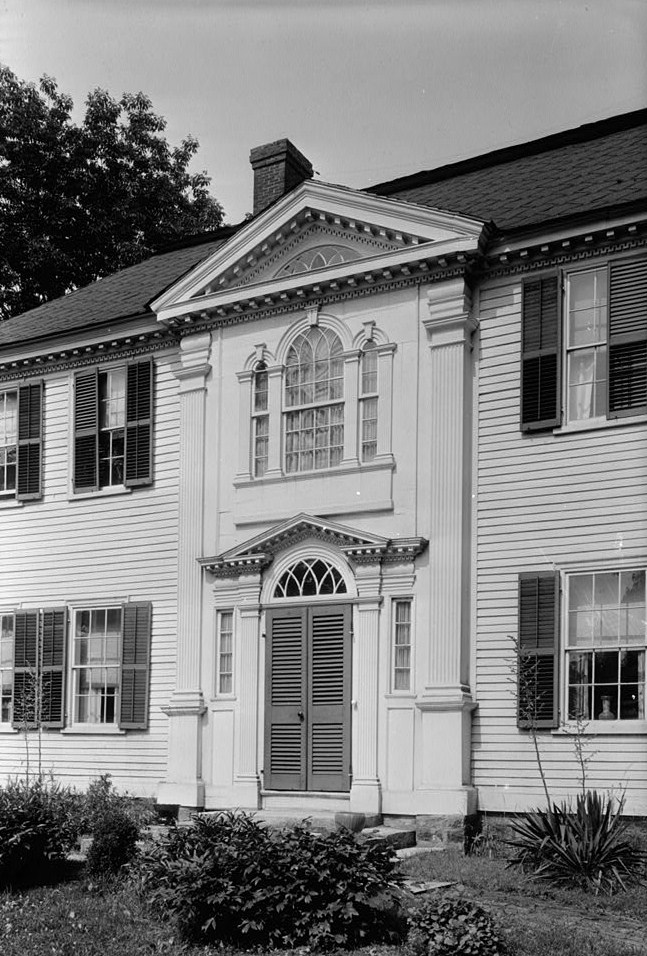
Projecting pavilion including front doorway, flanked by large pilasters, and 2nd story Palladian window with small pilasters, in 1940

The main cornice around the entire house includes modillion blocks just above a Greek fret. The two front corners of the house sport "fluted pilasters on high bases", which "also flank the central pavilion, framing also in miniature the elements of the Palladian window, which exhibits keystone arches and Gothic arch muntins in the large section." The Gothic pattern is "repeated in the lunette occupying the tympanum of the roof-line pediment above, which also has modillions and Greek fret under the raking cornice." The Palladian window is the combination window on the 2nd story, including a central large window with over-window plus two narrow side windows, separated by pilasters.

The foundation is of dressed stone blocks.

Inside, the ornamental fireplace mantel is original, as is the stairway and almost all moldings and other interior elements.

== Preservation ==
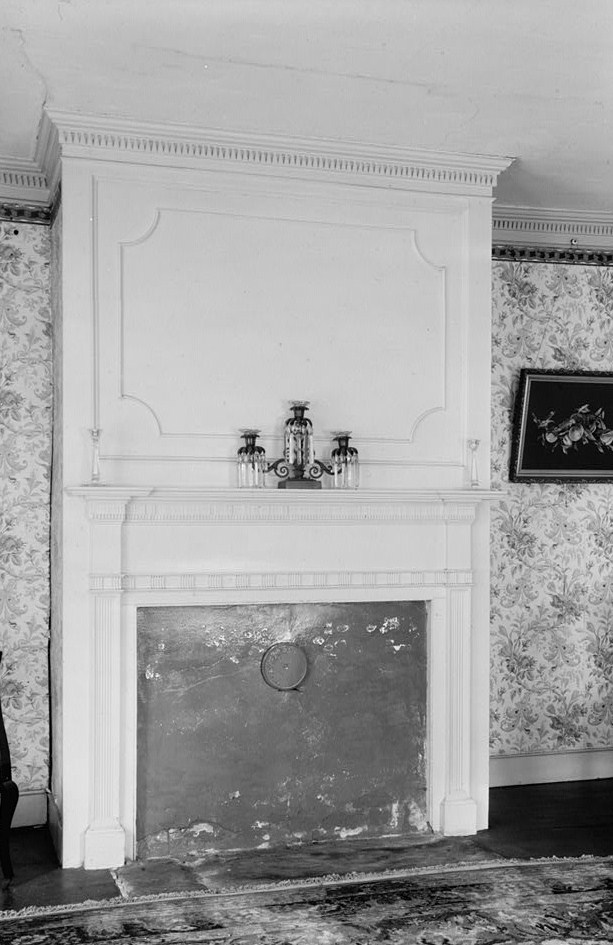
Mantel, in 1940

The house was surveyed in 1940 by the Historic American Buildings Survey, which termed it the "Elisha Payne House" and also the "Prudence Crandall School for Negro Girls", a name the school never had when open.

It was listed on the National Register of Historic Places in 1970.

The house was studied in depth in 1981. The study "concluded that there had been only minor changes to the house since the occupancy of Prudence Crandall and that approximately 95% of the structure is unaltered."

The building was declared a National Historic Landmark in 1991.

It is located within the Canterbury Center Historic District, another listing on the National Register of Historic Places. The house is a museum and includes period rooms, changing exhibits, a small research library (available for in-house study) and a gift shop.

== See also ==
- List of sites administered by the Connecticut State Historic Preservation Office
- List of National Historic Landmarks in Connecticut
- National Register of Historic Places listings in Windham County, Connecticut
