= William Noyes Farmstead =

Historic house in Connecticut, United States

- U.S. National Register of Historic Places
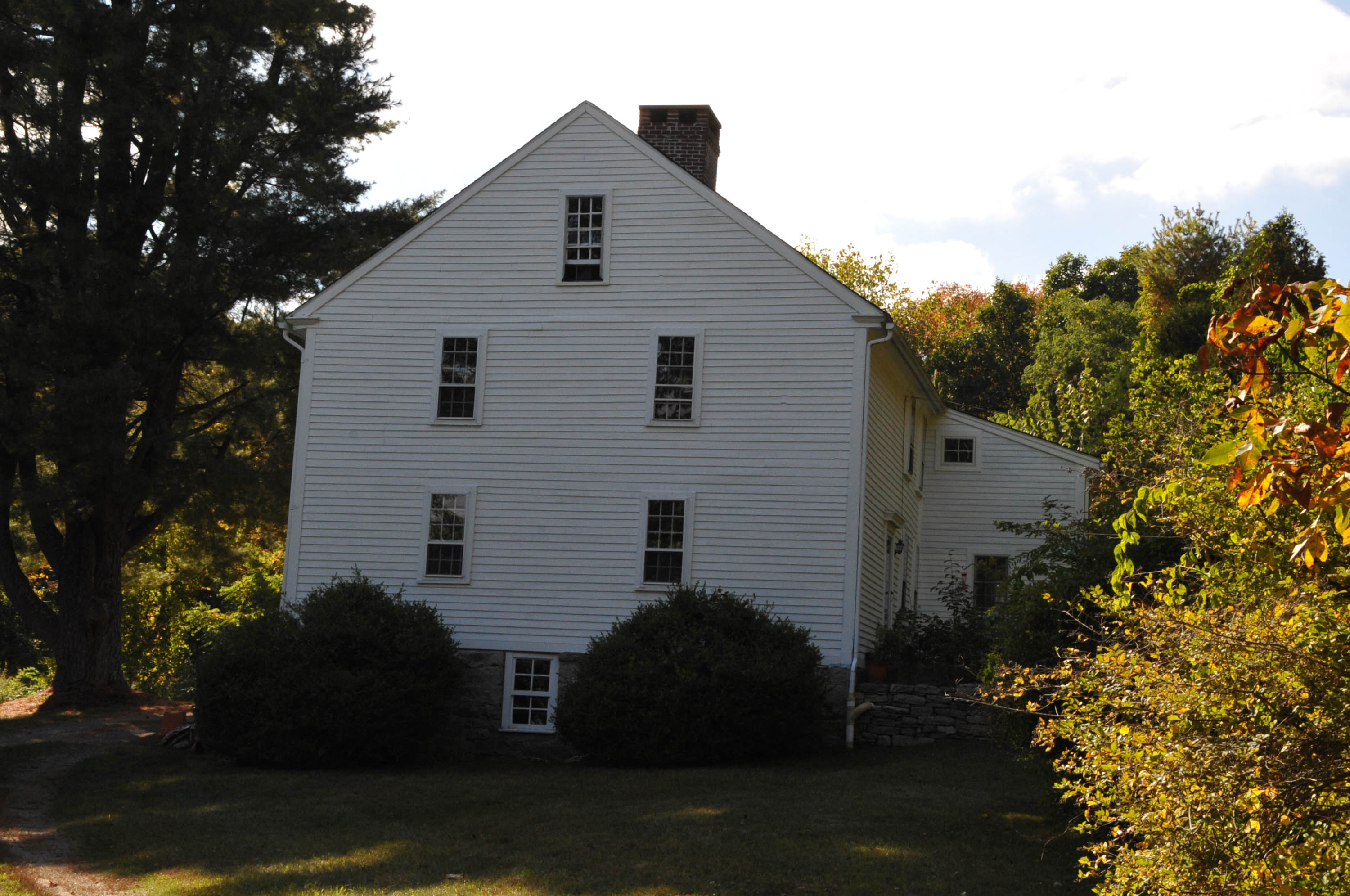

- Location within Connecticut Location within the United States
- Location: 340 Gallup Hill Road, Ledyard, Connecticut
- Coordinates: 41°24′30″N 71°58′1″W
- Area: 4 acres (1.6 ha)
- Built: 1735
- Architectural style: Colonial, Postmedieval English
- MPS: Ledyard MPS
- NRHP reference No.: 92001644
- Added to NRHP: December 14, 1992

The William Noyes Farmstead is a historic farm property at 340 Gallup Hill Road in Ledyard, Connecticut. Dating to about 1735, it is a well-preserved example of a rural farmstead. It was listed on the National Register of Historic Places in 1992.

== Description and history ==
The William Noyes Farmstead is located in southeastern Ledyard, its buildings set on either side of Gallup Hill Road west of its junction with Shewville Road. The house and a small barn are on the south side, while a larger barn is set close to the road on the north side. The house is a 2 1/2-story wood-frame structure, with a gabled roof, central chimney, and clapboarded exterior. It is oriented with its main facade to the south, away from the road, and is separated from the road by a fence. The front is five bays wide, with the entrance slight off center, framed by Federal period pilasters, transom window, and entablature. Both barns are set on rubblestone foundations, and are of post and beam framing. The larger one has been adapted for use as a studio.

The oldest portion of this house, probably its western half, was built about 1735 by William Noyes. The house was likely enlarged by James Woodbridge, who acquired the property from a member of the Noyes family in 1783, at which time it also received its Federal style. The house is unusual for its age in Ledyard, where most farm houses were 1 1/2-story Capes, and for its high state of preservation. The property remained in agricultural use into the early 1940s.

== See also ==
- National Register of Historic Places listings in New London County, Connecticut
