= Capt. Richard Charlton House =

Historic house in Connecticut

- U.S. National Register of Historic Places
- U.S. Historic district – Contributing property
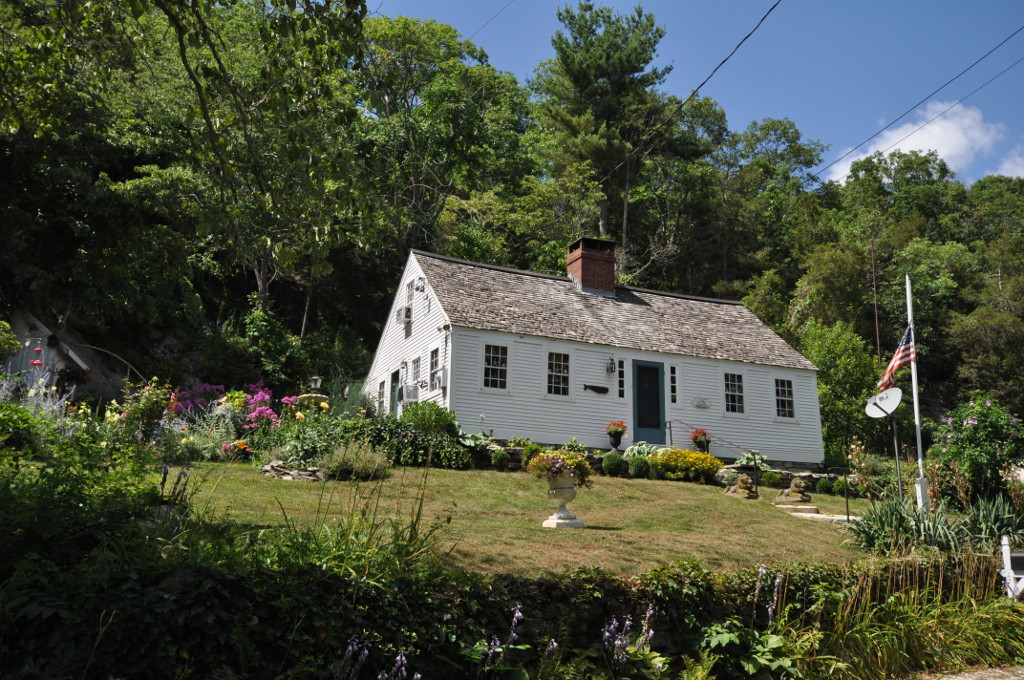
- Captain Richard Charlton Cottage in 2016

- Location within Connecticut Location within the United States
- Location: 12 Mediterranean Lane, Norwich, Connecticut
- Coordinates: 41°33′4″N 72°5′40″W
- Area: 1 acre (0.40 ha)
- Part of: Norwichtown Historic District (ID730019751)
- NRHP reference No.: 70000723

Significant dates
- Added to NRHP: October 15, 1970
- Designated CP: January 17, 1973

The Capt. Richard Charlton House is a historic house at 12 Mediterranean Lane in Norwich, Connecticut, built around 1800. It is a well-preserved example of an early 19th-century cottage with vernacular style. The house was listed on the National Register of Historic Places in 1970.

== Description and history ==
The Captain Richard Charlton House is located in Norwich's Norwichtown neighborhood, on the northwest side of Mediterranean Lane north of East Town Street. It is a 1 1/2-story wood-frame structure, five bays wide, with a side-gable roof and a large central chimney. The front door, centered on the main facade, is framed by sidelight windows with reproduced bullseye glass panes and pilasters. The interior has a typical central chimney plan, with an entry vestibule that also houses a narrow winding staircase to the attic. What was originally the kitchen (and is now the living room) is to the left, while there are a small bedroom and modern kitchen to the right. Floors have wide wooden boards, and walls are finished in reproduced vertical planking. Door hardware is a combination of original, old, and reproduction wrought iron.

It is estimated that the house was built around 1800, probably replacing a similar house built for Richard Charlton, a ship's captain. Charlton was a locally notable ship's captain who was killed in military service during the French and Indian War. This house may have been built with framing timbers from Charlton's original house by his son Samuel. The building underwent a major restoration in the 20th century.

== See also ==
- National Register of Historic Places listings in New London County, Connecticut
