= Whale Oil Row =

Historic houses in Connecticut

- U.S. National Register of Historic Places
- U.S. Historic district
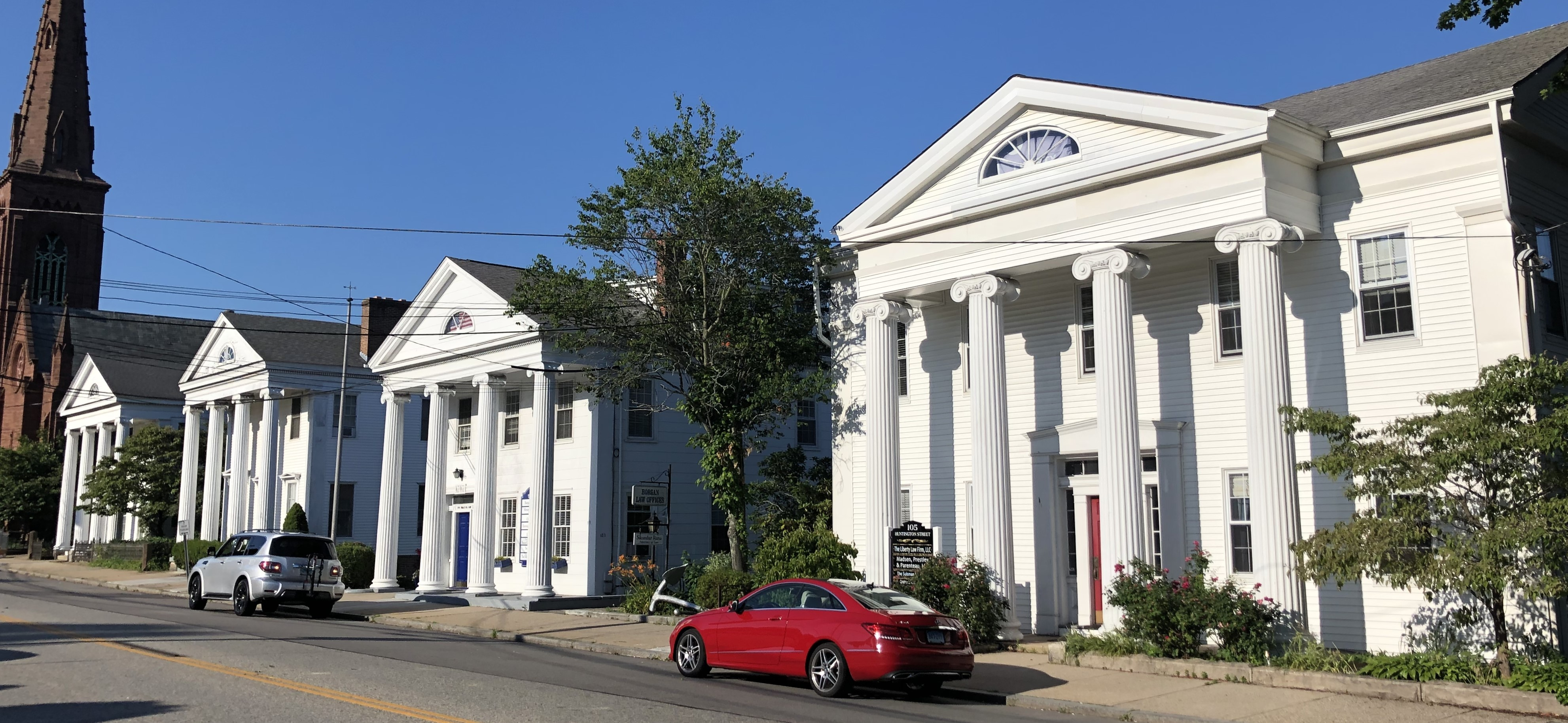
- (2022)

- Location within Connecticut Location within the United States
- Location: 105-119 Huntington Street, New London, Connecticut
- Coordinates: 41°21′22″N 72°6′0″W
- Area: 3 acres (1.2 ha)
- Built: 1835 - 1845
- Built by: Charles Henry Boebe
- Architectural style: Greek Revival
- NRHP reference No.: 70000714
- Added to NRHP: December 29, 1970

Whale Oil Row is a collection of four similar, high-quality Greek Revival houses standing side by side at 105–119 Huntington Street in New London, Connecticut. All were built for developer Ezra Chappel between 1835 and 1845 by Charles Henry Boebe, and they exemplify the wealth and taste of New London's whaling-funded upper class. They were added to the National Register of Historic Places in 1970.

== Description and history ==
Whale Oil Row is located in downtown New London on the east side of Huntington Street between Federal Street and Governor Winthrop Boulevard. All four buildings are 2 1/2-story wood-framed structures with gable roofs and mostly clapboarded exterior. All four are distinguished by their two-story gabled Greek Temple porticos, with fluted Ionic columns supporting entablatures with dentillated cornices. The gables above are fully pedimented with a semicircular window at the center. The first one (105 Huntington) is slightly wider than the others, extending on either side of the front portico. The other three have three-bay, flush-boarded facades with the main entrance in the left bay.

This assembly of high-quality Greek temple-front houses may be unique in the United States. All four were built between 1835 and 1845. The informal name "Whale Oil Row" is derived from the fact that the original owners largely earned their money from the whaling industry; two owned whaling ships, the third was a merchant, and the fourth was a physician. The buildings remained in residential use until about the mid-20th century, when they were all converted to commercial office space.

== See also ==
- National Register of Historic Places listings in New London County, Connecticut
