= Captain Enoch Lord House =

Historic house in Connecticut, United States

- Capt. Enoch Lord House
- U.S. National Register of Historic Places
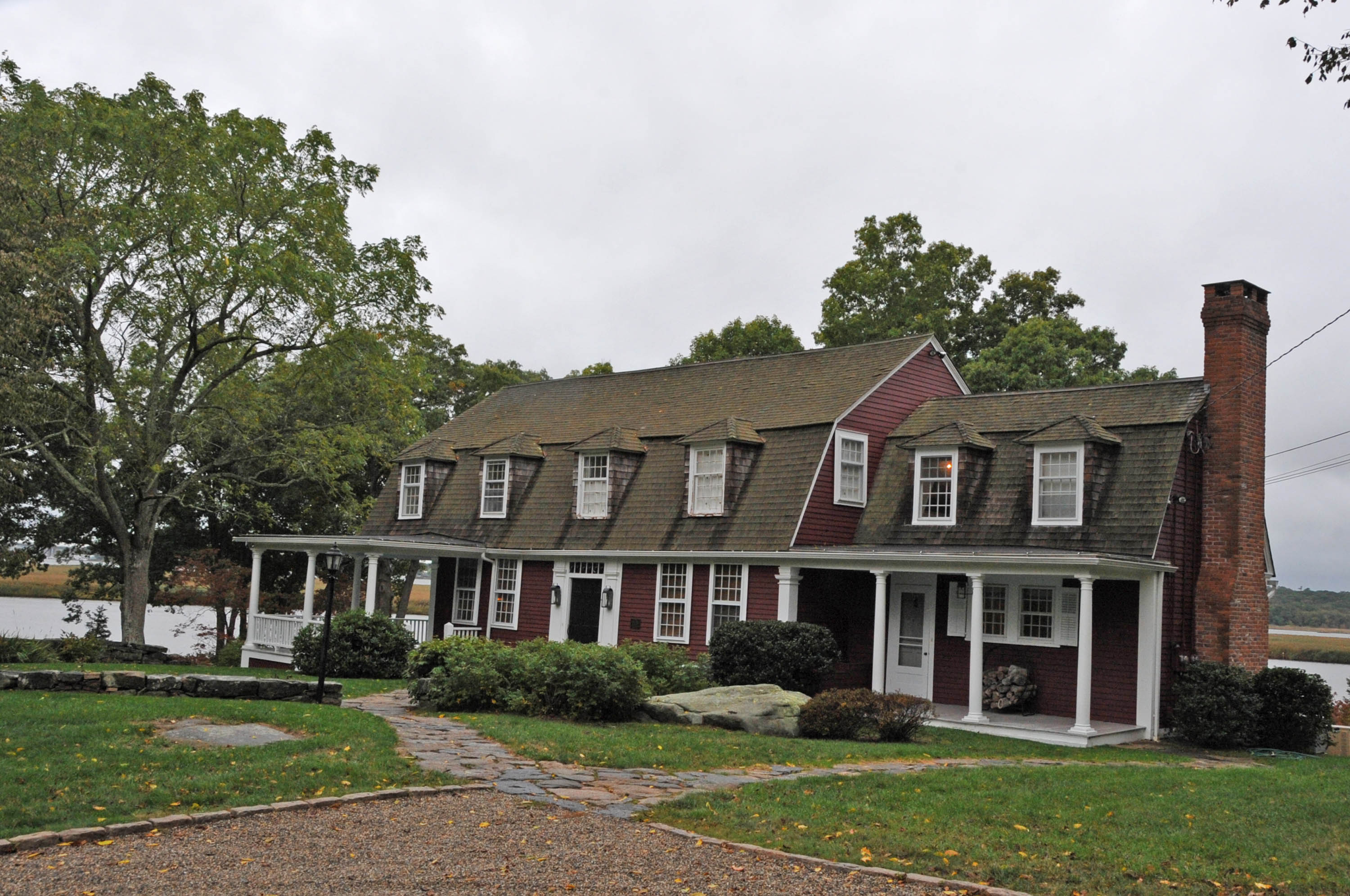

- Location within Connecticut Location within the United States
- Location: 17 Tantummaheag Road, Old Lyme, Connecticut
- Coordinates: 41°34′17″N 72°34′31″W
- Area: 8 acres (3.2 ha)
- Built: 1748
- Architectural style: Colonial, Colonial Revival
- NRHP reference No.: 07000418
- Added to NRHP: May 16, 2007

The Captain Enoch Lord House, also known as Red House, is a historic house at 17 Tantummaheag Road in Old Lyme, Connecticut. Built about 1748, the house is significant both for its long historic association with the colonial Lord family, who were influential participants in the founding of both the Connecticut Colony and the Saybrook Colony, and for its transformation in the late 19th century into a summer estate. The house was listed on the National Register of Historic Places in 2007.

== Description and history ==
The Captain Enoch Lord House is located in northwestern Old Lyme, near the western end of Tantummaheag Road. It is set on about 8 acres (3.2 ha) of land overlooking Lord's Cove, a bay on the Connecticut River, and includes a small island in the cove. The house is 1 1/2 stories in height, of wood-frame construction, and is covered by a gambrel roof and clapboard siding. The main facade is five bays wide, with a single-story porch extending from the leftmost bay around the left side, and another porch extending across the front of a recessed rightward ell. The main entrance is in the center bay, flanked by pilasters and topped by a transom window.

The property was acquired in 1648 by William Lord, then one of the leading figures in the Saybrook Colony. Lord was the son of Thomas Lord, one of the founding settlers of Hartford, Connecticut and the Connecticut Colony. The younger Lord acquired large tracts of land on either side of the Connecticut River, but the family holdings were later consolidated on its east side near "Tatomheag", named for a local Mohegan farmer.

The house was built about 1748 by Enoch Lord, the great-grandson of William Lord, around the time of his marriage. Originally located further north on Lord's Cove, it was moved to its present location in the 1860s by William M. Lord, and was transformed into a Colonial Revival summer house after its purchase in 1898 by Catherine and James Brown. This included the addition of a number of features suitable for country living at the turn of the 20th century, such as French doors. It also included the addition of a number outbuildings and a swimming pool.

== See also ==
- National Register of Historic Places listings in New London County, Connecticut
