= Little Plain Historic District =

Historic district in Connecticut, United States

- U.S. National Register of Historic Places
- U.S. Historic district
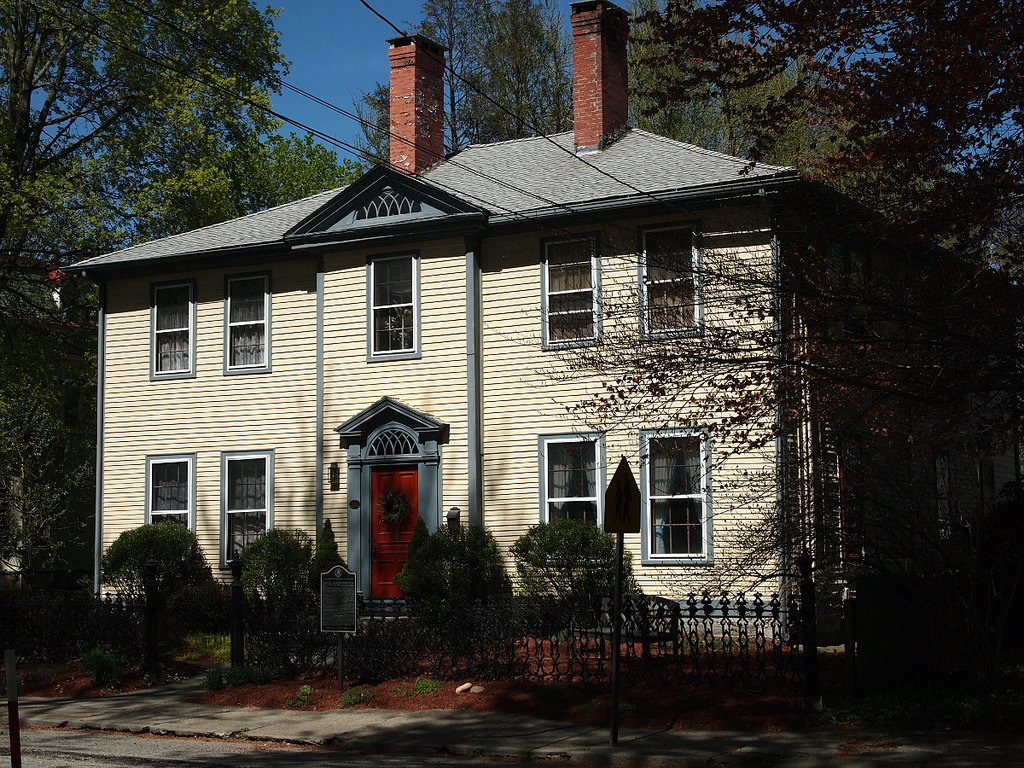
- DeWitt-Sigourney House

- Location within Connecticut Location within the United States
- Location: 120-156 Broadway and 10-88 Union Street, Norwich, Connecticut
- Coordinates: 41°31′38″N 72°4′38″W
- Area: 30 acres (12 ha) (original); 38.8 acres (15.7 ha) (after increase)
- Built: 1784
- Architect: James A. Hiscox; Joshua W. Shepard et al.
- Architectural style: Greek Revival, Federal, Italianate, Queen Anne
- NRHP reference No.: 70000718 (original); 86003541 (increase)

Significant dates
- Added to NRHP: October 15, 1970
- Boundary increase: January 12, 1987

The Little Plain Historic District is a predominantly residential historic district located in Norwich, Connecticut. When originally listed in 1970, it was centered on Little Plain Park, located about halfway between modern downtown Norwich and the Norwichtown green, the colonial center of the town. From the late 18th century onward this area became a desirable and fashionable area to live, as it was closer to the growing port area of the city. The area was mostly built out by about 1875, and features a rich concentration of Greek Revival, Gothic Revival and Italianate houses, although older and later styles are also represented. The district was listed on the National Register of Historic Places in 1970 and enlarged in 1987. The 1987 enlargement expanded the district southward along Union Street and Broadway, to abut the Downtown Norwich Historic District, and increased the district's size from 30 acres (12 ha) to 38.8 acres (15.7 ha).

Little Plain Park is a long and narrow triangular parcel bounded on the east by Broadway, the west by Union Street, and the south by Crossway Street. It was donated to the city by Deacon Jabez Huntington and Hezekiah Perkins, whose houses stand at 181 and 185 Broadway. Both are prominent examples of Georgian architecture to which Federal styling was later applied. The Dewitt-Sigourney House, at 189 Broadway, was built later in the 19th century for a ship's captain, and is a more pure example of Federal styling. The Woodhull and Johnson Houses at 167 and 171 Broadway are fine examples of Greek Revival architecture, built for merchants and ship owners.

The district includes buildings designed by Norwich architects James A. Hiscox and Joshua W. Shepard.

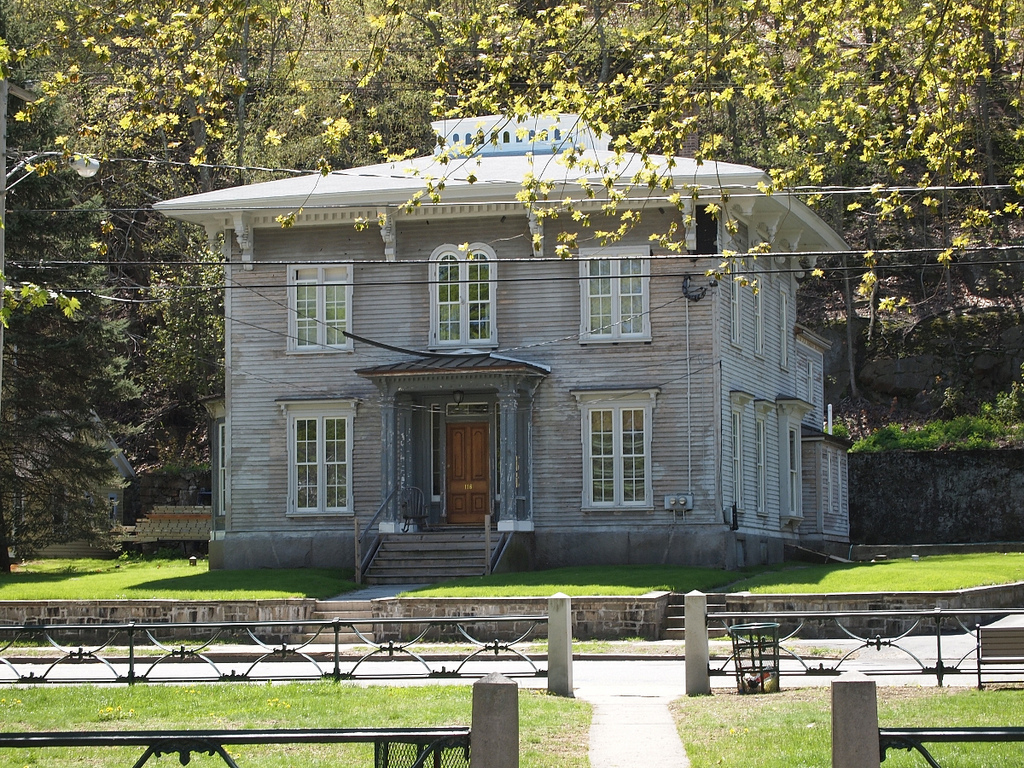
116 Union St.

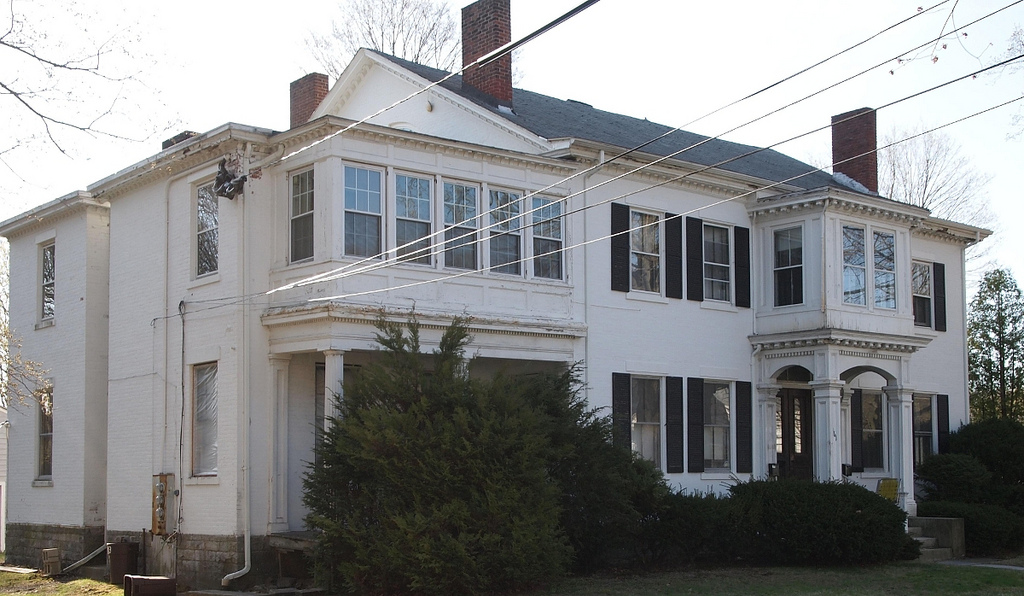
161 Broadway

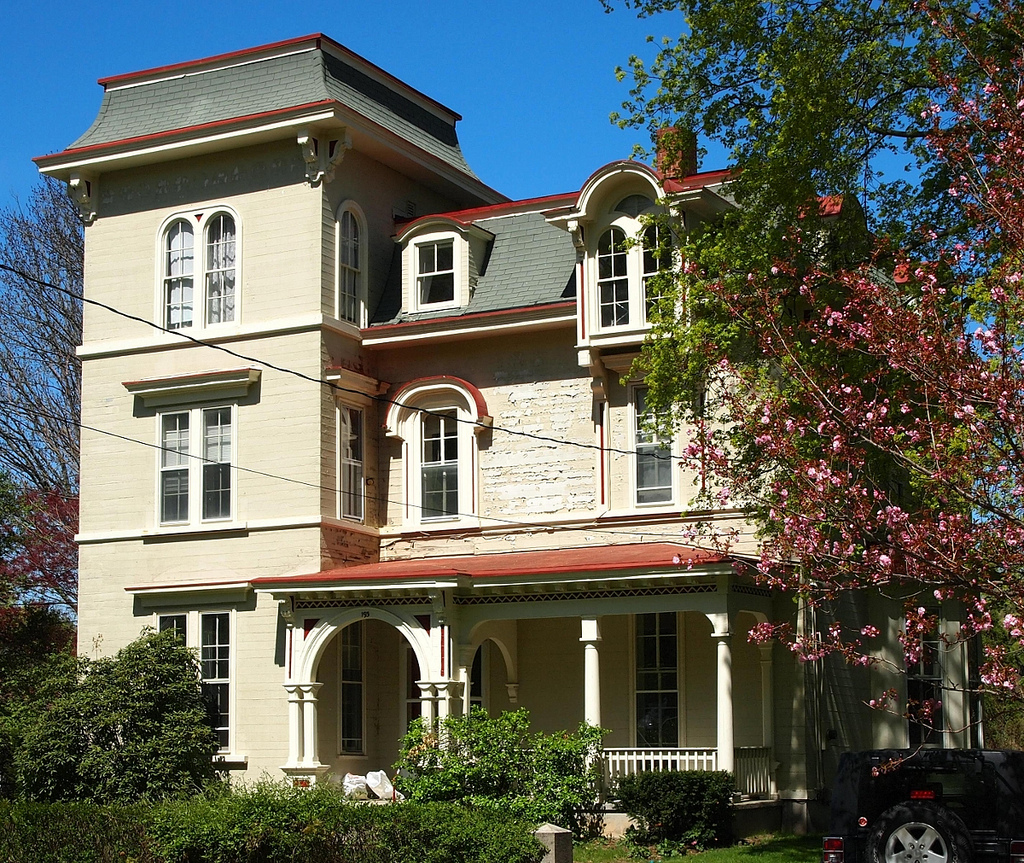
193 Broadway

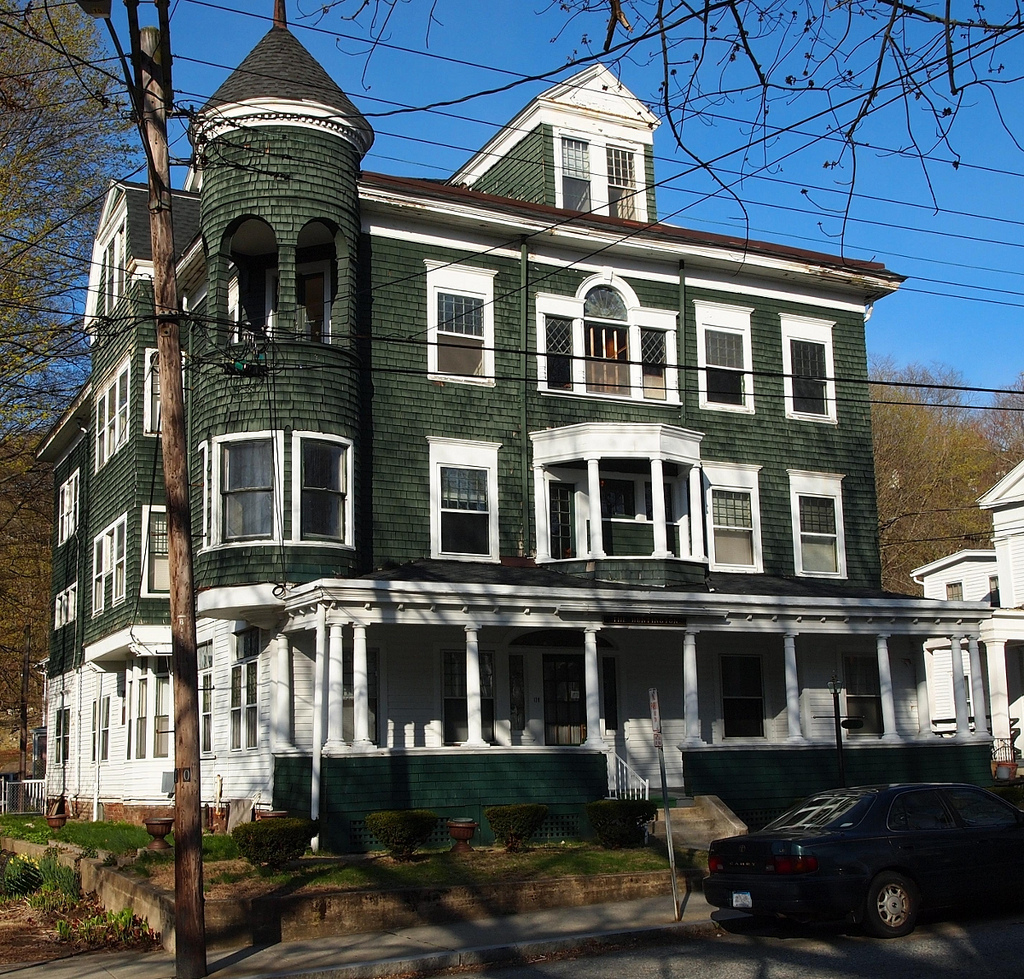
170 Broadway

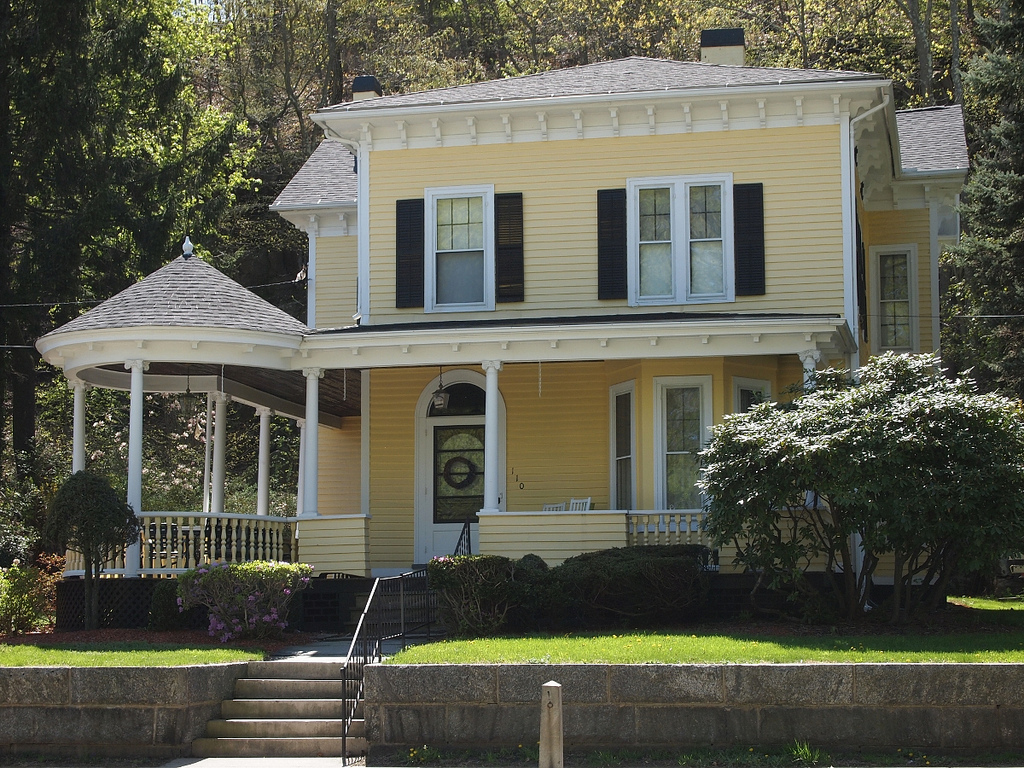
110 Union St.

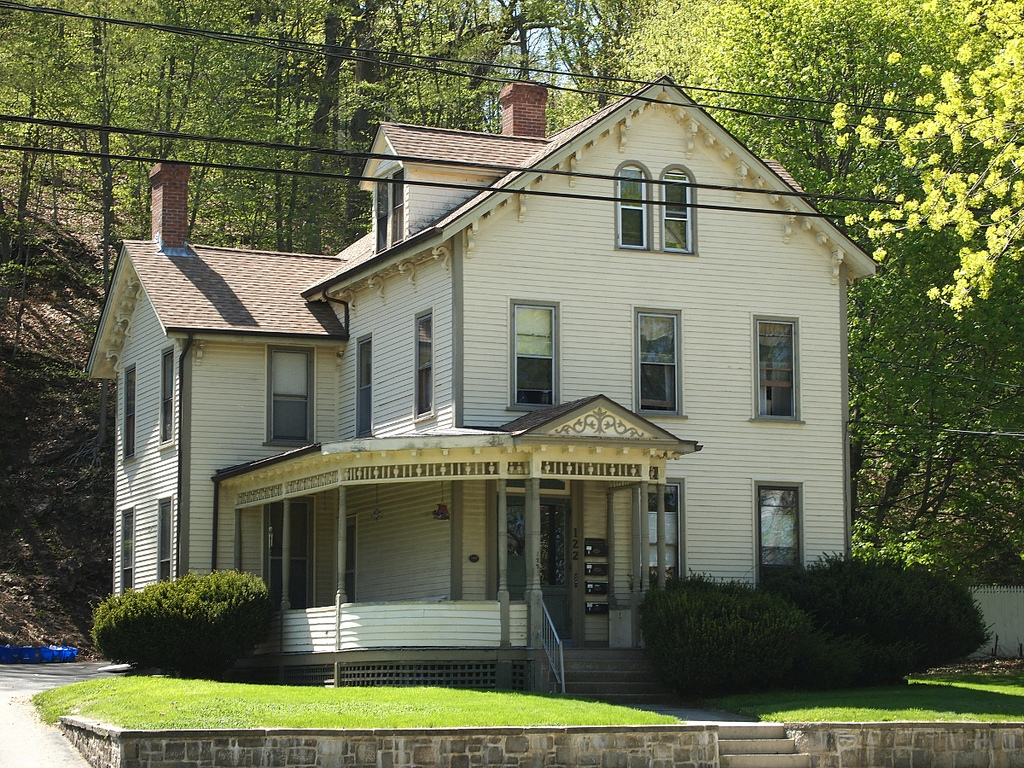
122 Union St.

== See also ==
- Neighborhoods of Norwich, Connecticut
- National Register of Historic Places listings in New London County, Connecticut
