= United States Post Office–Norwich Main =

- US Post Office-Norwich Main
- U.S. National Register of Historic Places
- U.S. Historic district – Contributing property
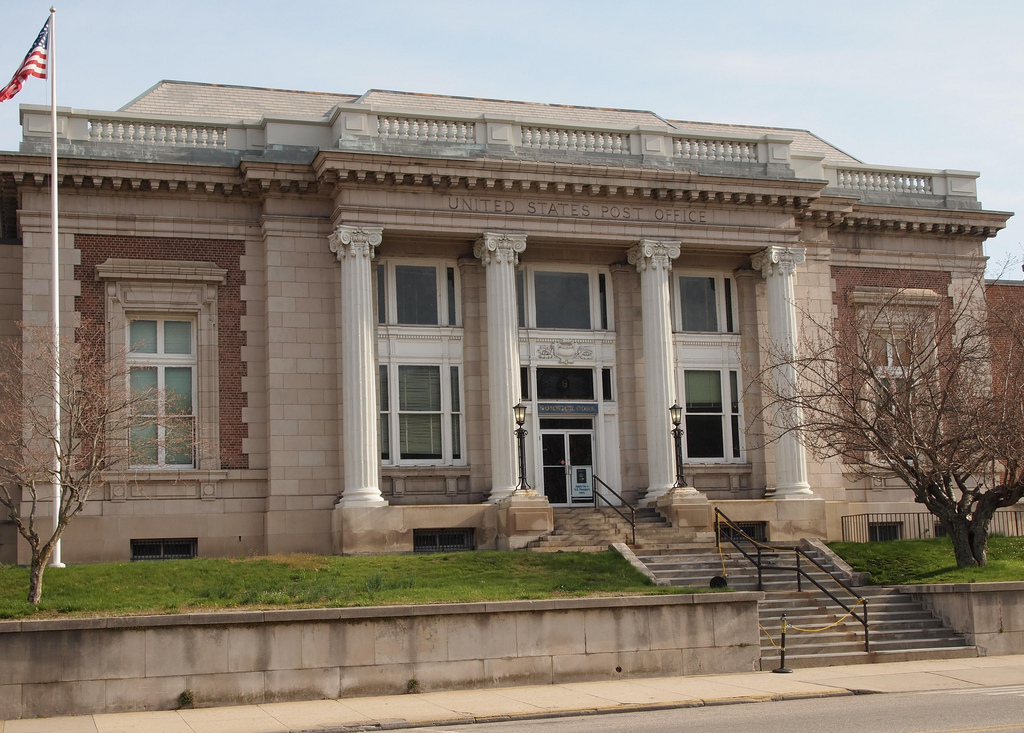

- Location within Connecticut Location within the United States
- Location: 340 Main Street, Norwich, Connecticut
- Coordinates: 41°31′28″N 72°4′19″W
- Area: less than one acre
- Built: 1905
- Architect: Taylor, James Knox
- Architectural style: Classical Revival
- Part of: Downtown Norwich Historic District (ID85000707)
- NRHP reference No.: 86002271

Significant dates
- Added to NRHP: July 17, 1986
- Designated CP: April 4, 1985

The US Post Office-Norwich Main is located at 340 Main Street in downtown Norwich, Connecticut. Built in 1905 and enlarged in 1938, it is a good local example of Classical Revival architecture, with an unusual level of detail for a period post office. The building was listed on the National Register of Historic Places on July 17, 1986.

== Description and history ==
The Norwich Main Post Office is located on the eastern fringe of its central business district, on the north side of Main Street between Cliff and Park Streets. It is a tall single-story Classical Revival structure, built of steel framing faced in limestone and brick. It has a mansard-style roof surrounded by a stone balustrade, and a slightly projecting center entrance three bays in width. This section is framed by four fluted Ionic columns, and is flanked by windows set in elaborate bracketed and corniced stone surrounds. Some of the exterior detailing is reflected in the main lobby area, where there are Ionic pilasters rising to detailed ceiling molding.

The building was designed in 1903 by James Knox Taylor and built in 1905, with a 1938 addition designed by Louis A. Simon and funded by the Public Works Administration. It was one of only six buildings designed by Taylor in 1903, resulting in an unusually detailed design. The addition was made with similar materials to the original; while not as elaborate in its design, it has elements that tie the two sections together.

== See also ==
- National Register of Historic Places listings in New London County, Connecticut
- List of United States post offices
