= Prospect Street Historic District =

Historic district in Connecticut, United States

- U.S. National Register of Historic Places
- U.S. Historic district
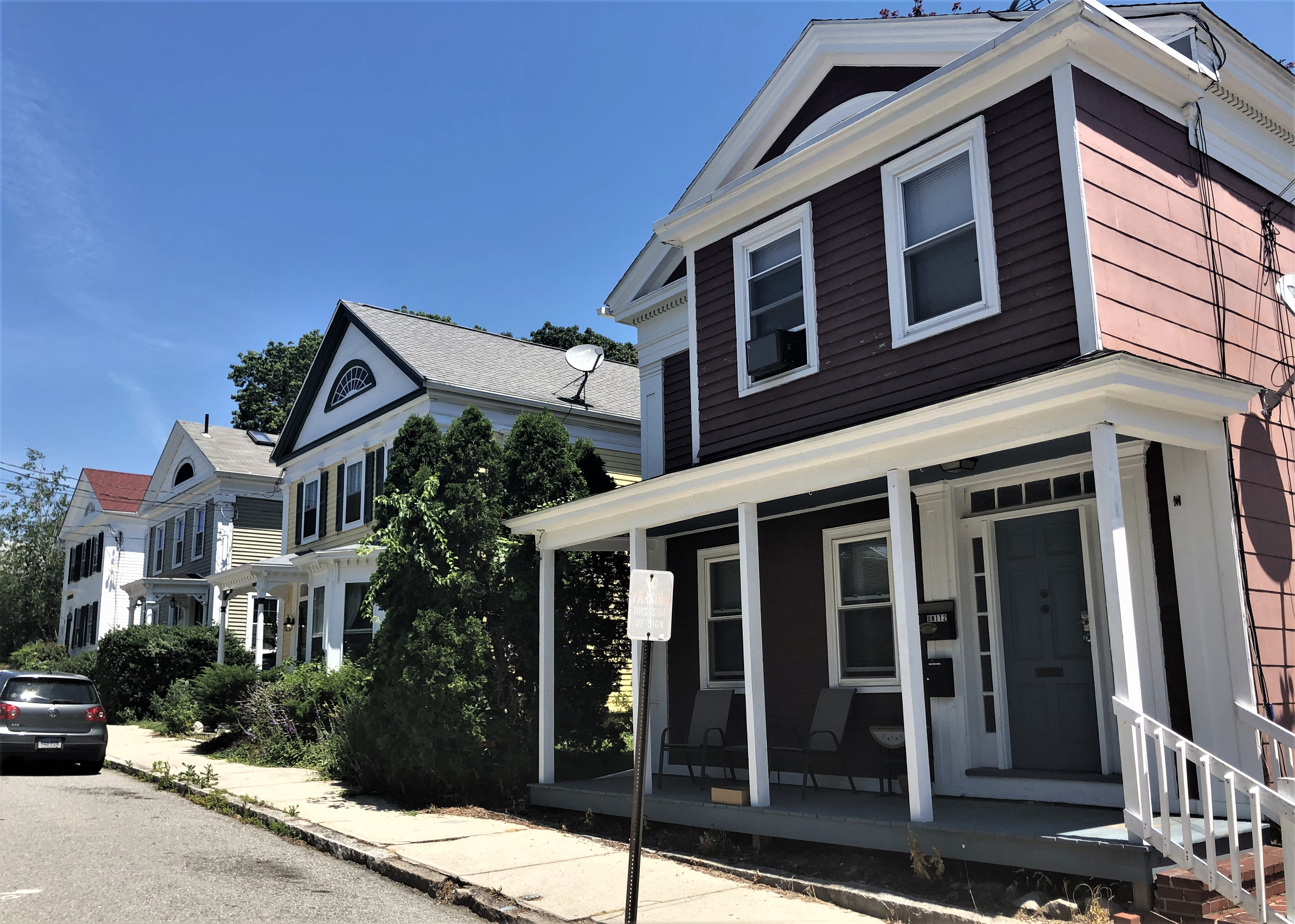
- The Greek Revival houses on the east side of Prospect Street (2022)

- Location within Connecticut Location within the United States
- Location: Roughly bounded by Bulkeley Place, Huntington, Federal, and Hempstead Streets, New London, Connecticut
- Coordinates: 41°21′27″N 72°6′2″W
- Area: 5.5 acres (2.2 ha)
- Built: 1840
- Architect: Crandall, Lewis; Et al.
- Architectural style: Greek Revival, Italianate, Gothic Revival, Queen Anne; also elements of Second Empire, Colonial Revival, Eastlake
- NRHP reference No.: 86002114
- Added to NRHP: July 31, 1986

The Prospect Street Historic District encompasses approximately 5.5 acres northwest of the central business district of New London, Connecticut. The district is bounded by Bulkeley Place on the north, Hempstead Street on the west, Federal Street on the south and Huntington Street on the east. Prospect Street bisects the district on a north-south axis. The residential area includes 24 buildings, most of which are Greek Revival or Italianate houses built between 1838 and 1859. The area was developed in response to local demand for increased middle-class housing, and the dense development and modest scale of the buildings is reflective of this objective.

The district was listed on the National Register of Historic Places on July 31, 1986.

== Description and history ==
Prospect Street was developed in the 1830s in response to increased demand for middle-class housing occasioned by New London's economic success as a whaling center. Two real estate developers, Hezekiah Goddard and Sabin Smith, purchased the Hallam family estate, bounded by Hempstead, Federal, and Huntington Streets, and Bulkeley Place, in 1836. The northern half was developed by Smith, who laid out Prospect Street, and sold off parcels to others, who either further subdivided or built on the properties. These subsidiary developers were typically involved directly or indirectly in the whaling business, as suppliers or workers in firms doing business with whaling ships.

Fifteen of the 24 houses in the district are Greek Revival in style, reflecting their construction relatively early in the subdivision. Four houses are Italianate – two each on Huntington and Federal Streets – one of which is brick. One house in the district is in the Gothic Revival style. One of the houses in the district is an early Federal dwelling, and two of the original Greek Revival houses were replaced by a 1889 Queen Anne house and a 1905 Colonial Revival. The Greek Revival houses on Prospect Street are generally two-and-one-half stories tall, but those on Huntington are taller, as their basements are exposed due to being built into the side of a hill. The Greek Revival house at 17 Prospect Street is notable for its four-column temple front, with details copied from a builder's guide published by Minard Lafever.

== Gallery ==
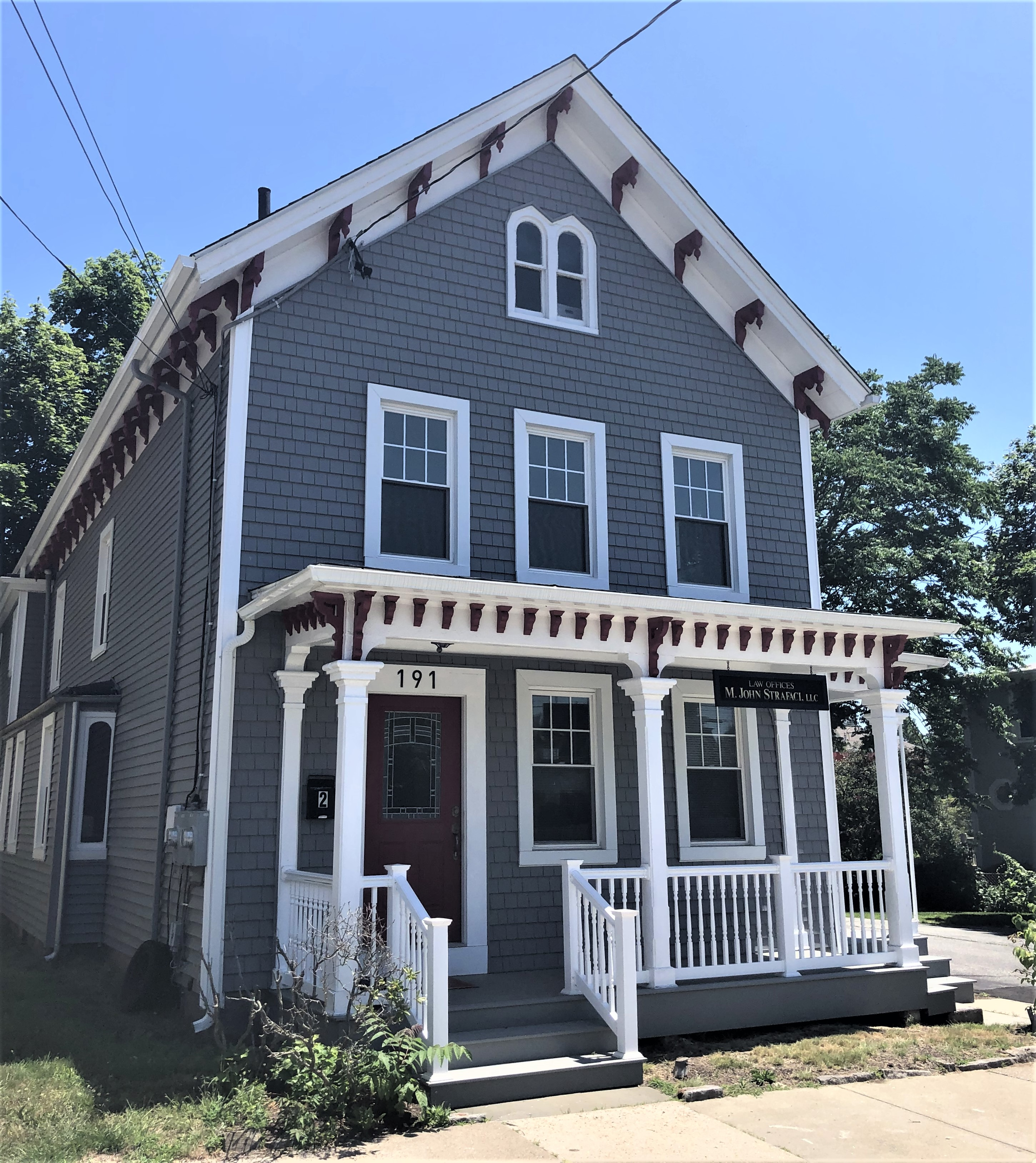
The Italianate 191 Hempstead Street was built in 1841

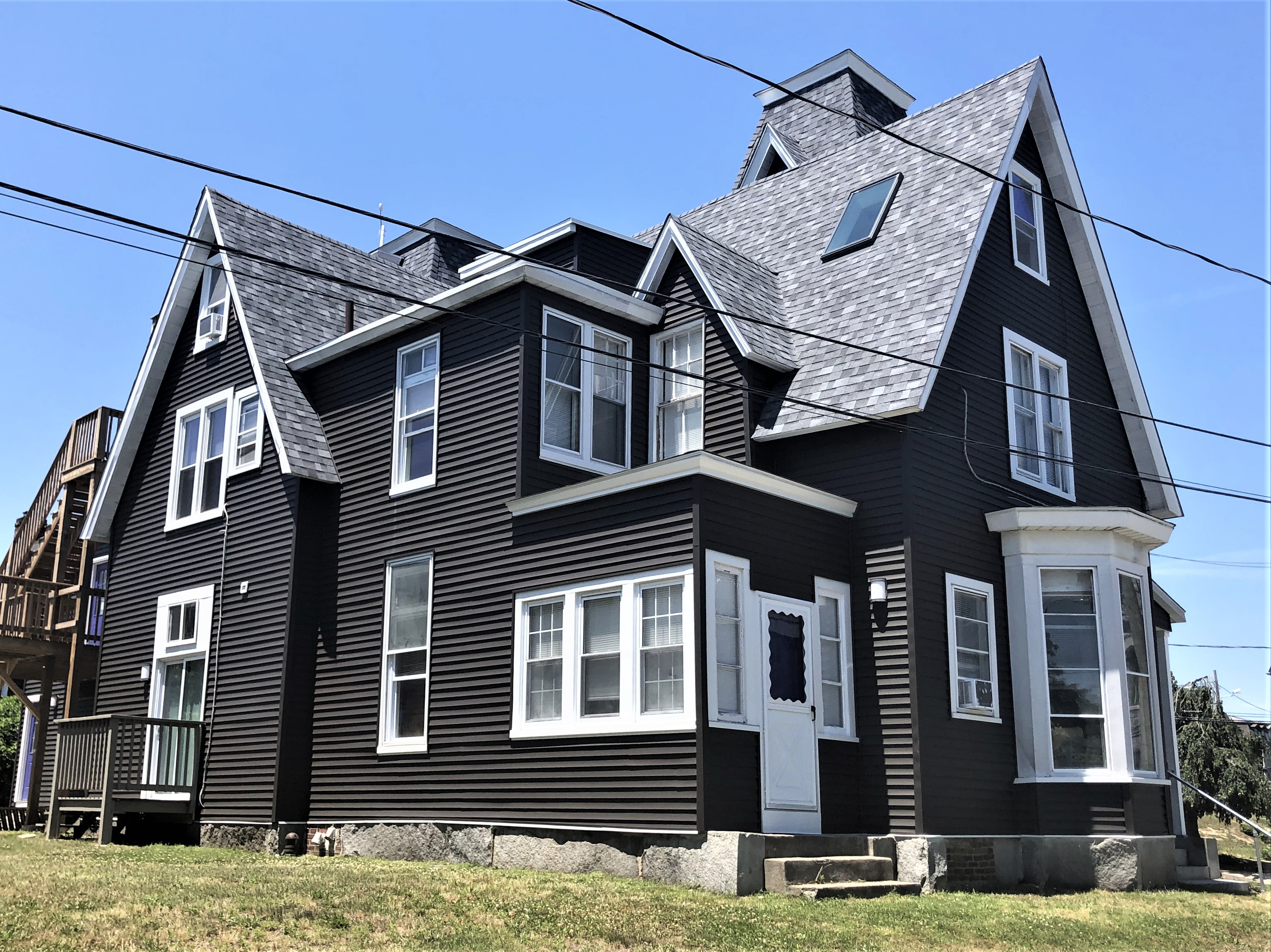
The house at 26 Prospect Street at the corner of Bulkeley Place was built in 1844 in the Gothic Revival style

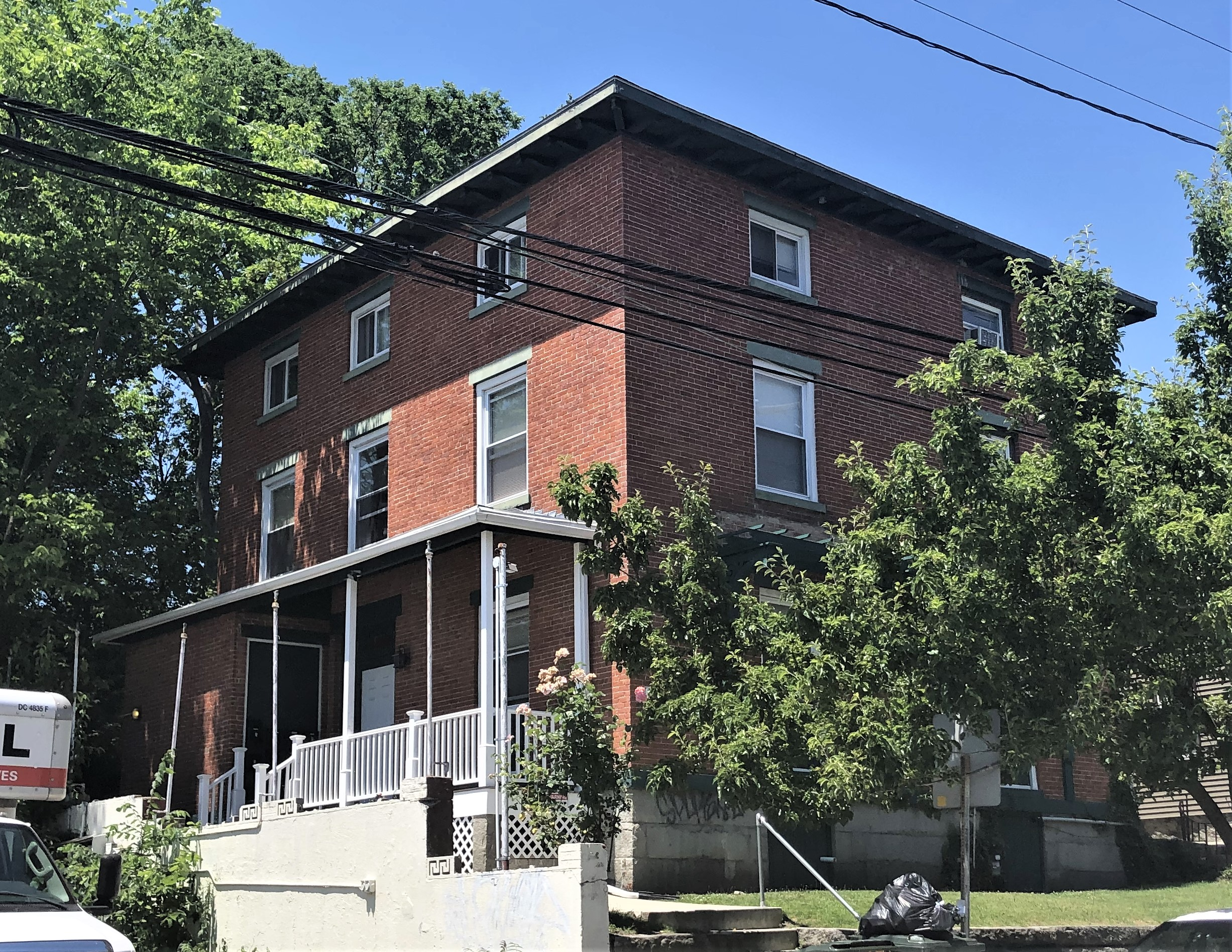
The 1851 brick house at 138 Huntington Street at the corner of Federal Street is a combination of the Greek Revival and Italianate styles

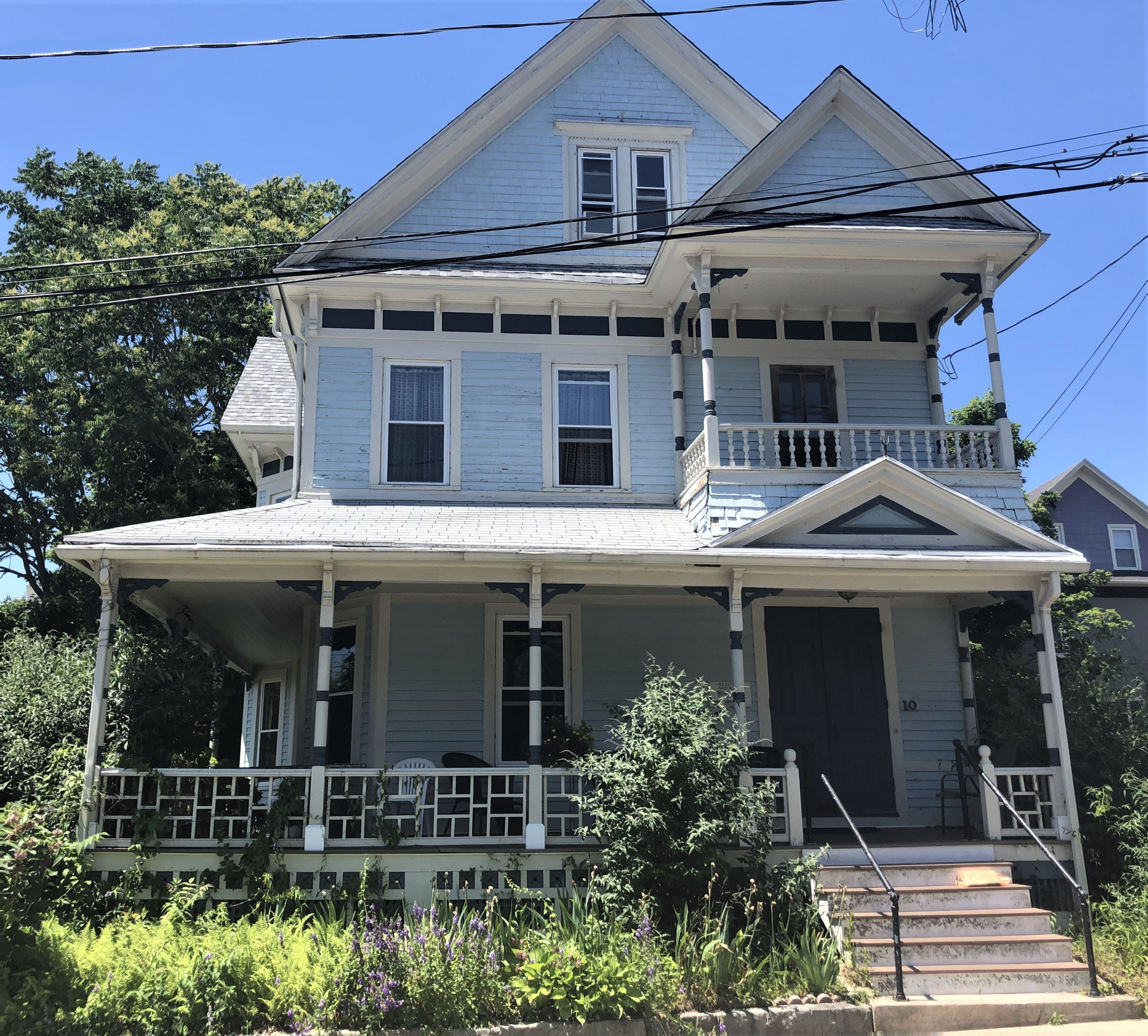
10 Prospect Street, built in 1889 in the Queen Anne style

== See also ==
- National Register of Historic Places listings in New London County, Connecticut
