= Acors Barns House =

Historic house in Connecticut

- U.S. National Register of Historic Places
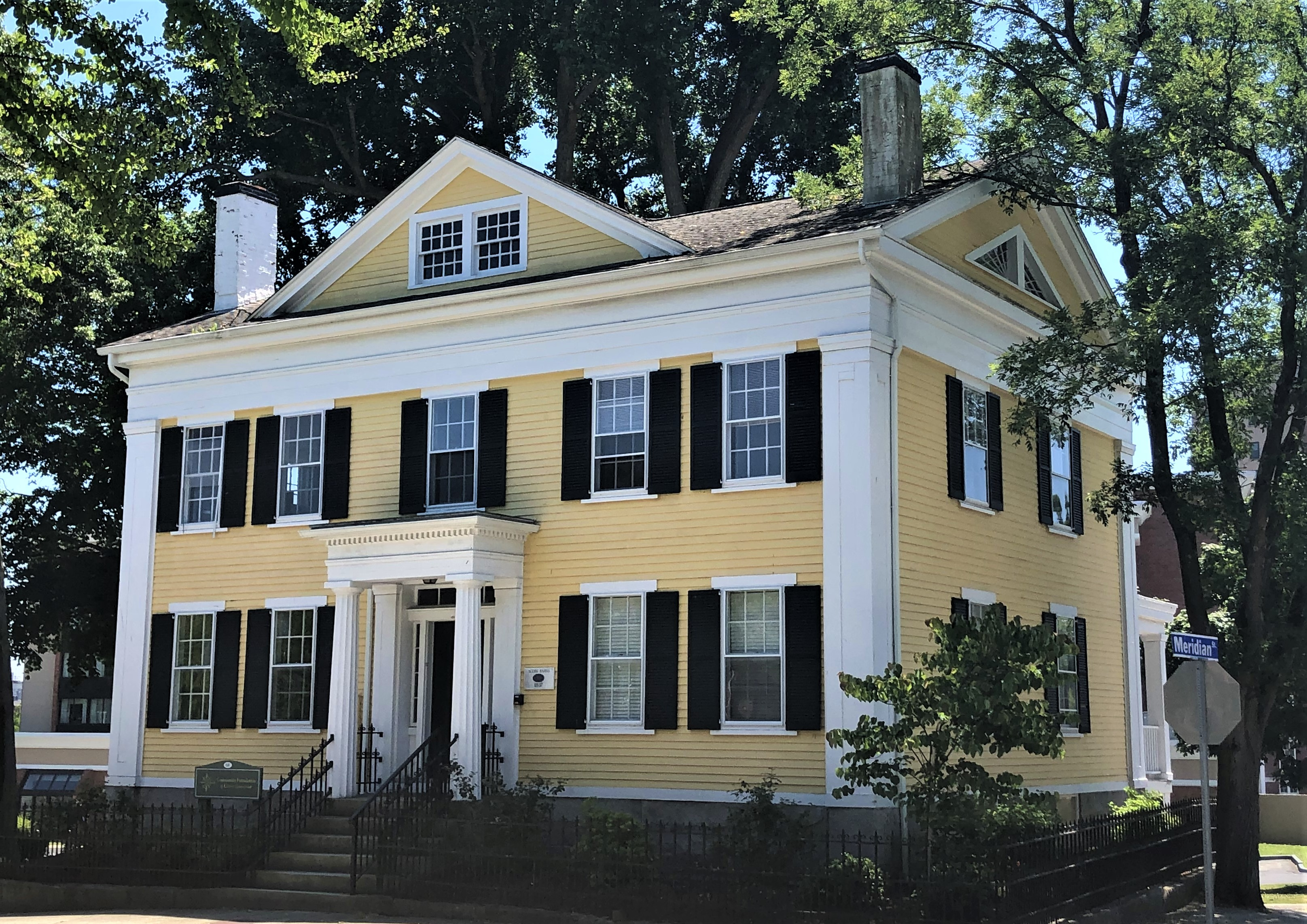
- (2022)

- Location within Connecticut Location within the United States
- Location: 68 Federal Street, New London, Connecticut
- Coordinates: 41°21′25″N 72°5′56″W
- Built: 1837
- Architectural style: Greek Revival
- NRHP reference No.: 76001992
- Added to NRHP: April 22, 1976

The Acors Barns House is located at 68 Federal Street at the corner of Meridian Street in New London, Connecticut. Barns was a wealthy merchant in the whaling industry whose company became one of the largest whaling firms in the city. He managed to avoid the collapse of whaling by investing elsewhere; he was the founder of the Bank of Commerce in 1852, and his son and grandson succeeded him as presidents.

The Acors Barns House is a two-and-one-half story Greek Revival house built in 1837 with a gable roof and clapboarded exterior. The front facade is five bays wide with a Greek Revival portico leading to the main entrance. Additions to the house include a projecting center dormer and a second-story projection over a partially enclosed veranda. The plain exterior is contrasted by the interior's elaborate hall ceilings, detailed woodwork, and arched marble fireplaces. David Collins wrote in the New London Day that the Acors Barns house is a "fine and rare example" of architecture that is especially important to New London.

The Acors Barns House was added to the National Register of Historic Places (NRHP) on April 22, 1976.

== Acors Barns ==
Acors Barns was born in 1794, the son of a mariner. He grew up in Westerly, Rhode Island, and Stonington, Connecticut, before moving to New London, Connecticut, and forming a whaling company with William Williams Jr. in 1827. The company prospered and became one of the largest firms in the city. Barns avoided the 1849 decline of the whaling industry by investing in the Willimantic and Palmer Railroad, then establishing the Bank of Commerce in 1852. He died in 1862, but his sons succeeded him as presidents of the bank.

== Design ==
The Acors Barns House is a two-and-one-half-story Greek Revival house built in 1837, with a gable roof and clapboarded exterior. The front facade of the house is five bays wide with six-over-six sash windows, and the main entrance has a Greek Revival portico supported by fluted Doric columns. The single-panel door is surrounded by sidelights. The corners of the building have simple pilasters and four chimneys rising from the top. The rear of the house has a one-story veranda with a shallow hipped roof that is supported by square columns with a balustrade. The veranda has large six-over-nine sash windows that extend almost a full story. The house is surrounded by trees and shrubs and a wrought iron fence that helps set it apart from the neighborhood.

Modifications to the house include the addition of a large pediment-shaped dormer that projects from the center of the main roof and is lighted by a rectangular double window. Part of the veranda was enclosed, and the stairs that lead to a formal garden were removed. Above the center of the veranda is a second-story projection that was described in the site's nomination to the National Register of Historic Places as visually compromising the elegance of the rear facade.

The plain exterior contrasts with the elegance of the interior. The house has elaborate hall ceilings, detailed woodwork, and arched marble fireplaces. The floor plan is built around the central hall with an offset stairway. The parlor rooms to the right are separated by a wide archway. To the left are a dining room and a pantry that has a dumbwaiter which runs down to the kitchen in the cellar. The National Register of Historic Places nomination noted that the cellar contained the "remains of the kitchen, washroom and wine cellar". The second floor is composed of four chambers, and the attic consists of five small rooms. The attic's rooms served as the servants' quarters.

== Owners ==
The Acors Barns House has gone through several owners over its lifetime. In 1862, it passed from Acors Barns to his son William H. Barns. In 1893, son Charles Barns acquired the title to the house and transferred it upon his death to Harriet Barns Vincent, the daughter of his sister. Harriet Barns Vincent sold the house to Julia O'Sullivan in 1919. Francis McGuire purchased it in 1956 and used it to house the offices of his law firm. It then passed to James McGuire, who sold it in 2013 to the Community Foundation of Eastern Connecticut for $325,000. The foundation stated it would continue to preserve the house's historical integrity.

== Importance ==
Bruce Clouette writes in the NRHP information, "The Barns house physically documents the symbiosis by which the wealthy and the propertyless shared a home. Its value as an artifact is enhanced by the successful reuse which has retained the character of the building." David Collins writes, "The Barns house is also especially important to New London because it is such a fine and rare example of the architectural fabric of the big swath of the downtown that was demolished in urban renewal in the 1960s."

== See also ==
- National Register of Historic Places listings in New London County, Connecticut
