= Capt. Thomas Fanning Farmstead =

Historic farmstead

- U.S. National Register of Historic Places
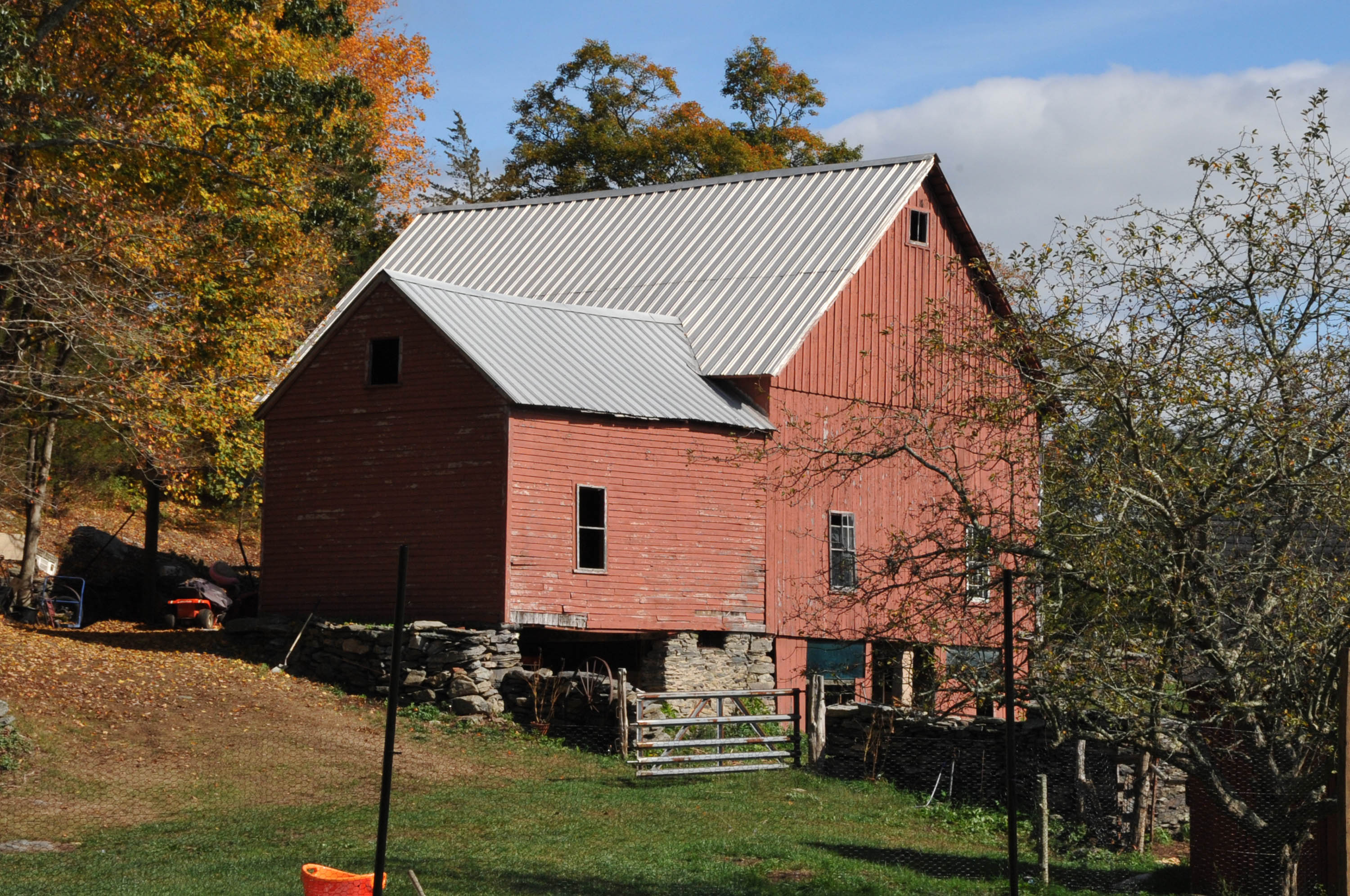
- The farmstead's barn

- Location within Connecticut Location within the United States
- Location: 1004 Shewville Road, Ledyard, Connecticut
- Coordinates: 41°28′49″N 71°59′34″W
- Area: 4 acres (1.6 ha)
- Built: 1746
- Built by: Fanning, Thomas
- Architectural style: Colonial, Postmedieval English
- MPS: Ledyard MPS
- NRHP reference No.: 92001643
- Added to NRHP: December 14, 1992

The Capt. Thomas Fanning Farmstead is a historic farm property located at 1004 Shewville Road in Ledyard, Connecticut. With a building history dating to around 1746, it is one of the oldest surviving agricultural properties in the town, including the house, barn, and smaller outbuildings. The property, now reduced to 4 acres (1.6 ha), was listed on the National Register of Historic Places in 1992.

== Description and history ==
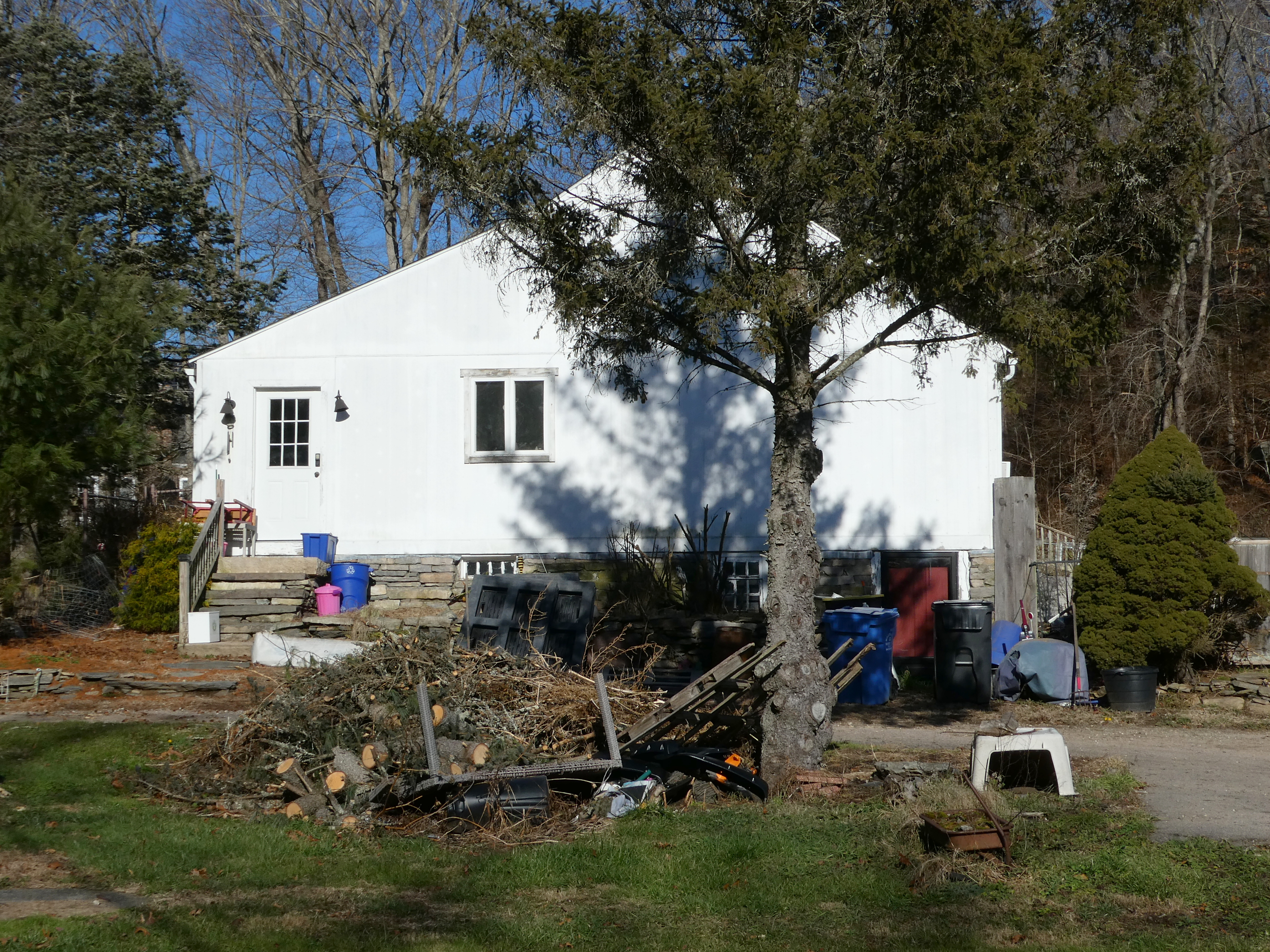
The house in December 2023

The Captain Thomas Fanning Farmstead is located in a rural setting in northern Ledyard, near the town line with Preston. It is set on four acres on the east side of Shewville Road, one of which houses the buildings of the farmstead around a grassy meadow. The house is a 1 1/2-story Cape style wood-frame structure with a central chimney. It is oriented with its main facade angled away from the road, toward the southeast. That facade is five bays wide, with a center entrance. A shed-roof section extends the building to the rear (toward the street). Outbuildings spread around the meadow include an 18th-century barn, and several 19th-century farm buildings: a corn crib, blacksmith shop, sheds, and another small barn. Some of the outbuildings stand on older foundations than what their construction methods suggest.

The documented history of the property begins in 1746–47, when Thomas Fanning purchased 100 acres (40 ha) from Jonathan Brewster of Preston, with a barn already standing on it. Fanning then built a portion of the house, which his son Frederick probably widened to five bays when he took over the property in 1789. Frederick sold the property to his brother-in-law in 1793.

== See also ==
- National Register of Historic Places listings in New London County, Connecticut
