= Coit Street Historic District =

Historic district in Connecticut

- U.S. National Register of Historic Places
- U.S. Historic district
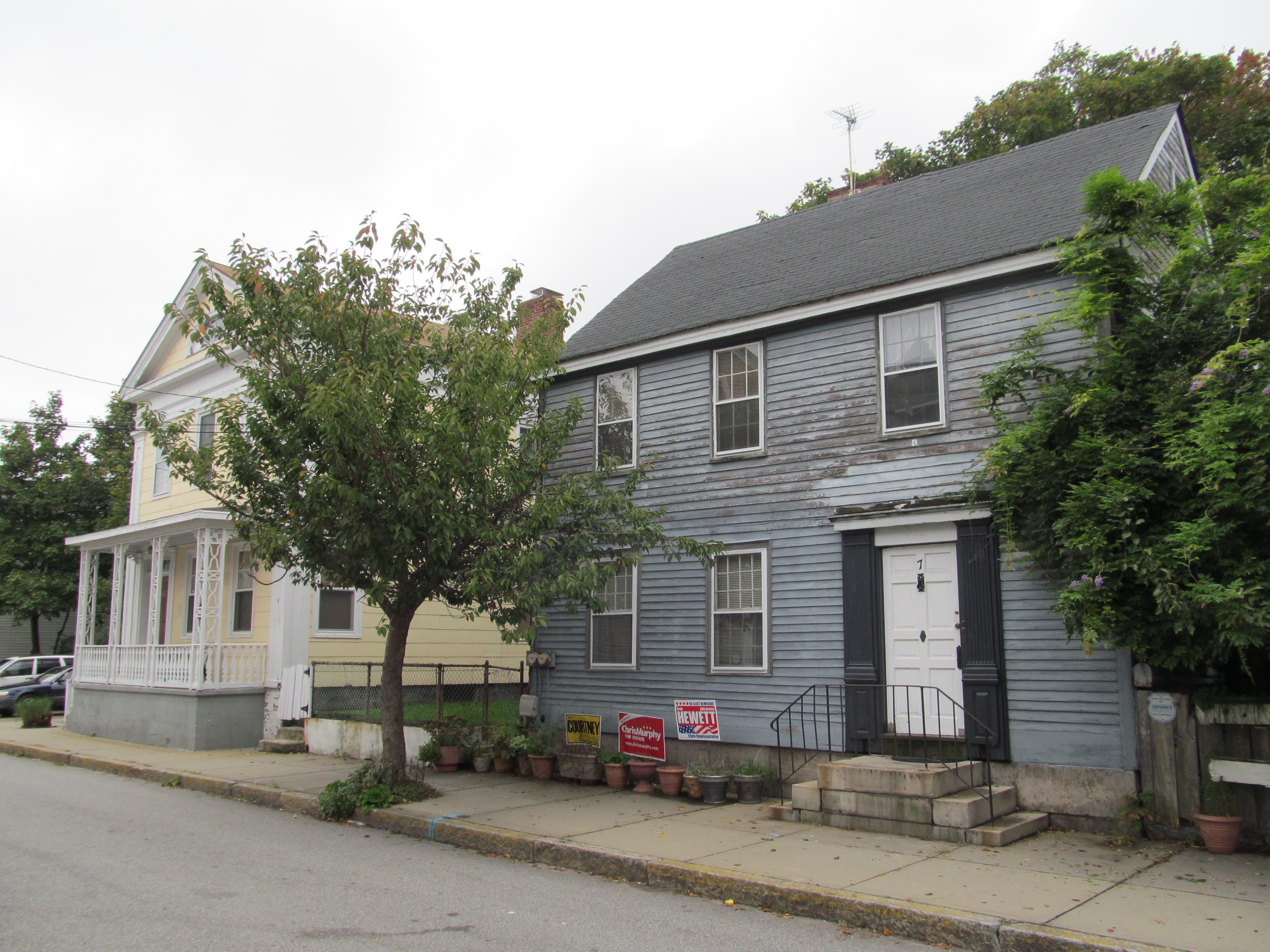
- Coit Street

- Location within Connecticut Location within the United States
- Location: Roughly bounded by Coit Street, Washington, Tilley Street, Bank Street, and Reed Street, New London, Connecticut
- Coordinates: 41°21′5″N 72°6′1″W
- Area: 4 acres (1.6 ha)
- Architect: Multiple
- Architectural style: Greek Revival, Late Victorian, Federal
- NRHP reference No.: 88000068
- Added to NRHP: February 19, 1988

The Coit Street Historic District in New London, Connecticut, is a historic district that was listed on the National Register of Historic Places in 1988. It includes 33 contributing buildings over a 4 acres (1.6 ha) area, located just southwest of the city's central business district. The area included in the district was formerly known as Bream Cove, which was filled in and developed in the 19th century. It includes all of the properties on Coit and Brewer Streets, as well as those on Blinman Street.

== Description and history ==
Coit Street is one of New London's oldest streets, probably laid out in the late 1640s, when houses began to be built facing Bream Cove. The street roughly follows what was historically the coastline of the cove prior to its 19th-century filling and development. Seven acres were purchased in 1694 by the Coit family, an influential family of shipbuilders and businessmen. William Coit, whose house stands at 92 Washington Street, was an active mariner in the American Revolutionary War. As the cove began to be filled in during the 19th century, the area continued to be a desirable residential area, mainly for its proximity to the downtown. Infill development in the second half of the 19th century provided the area with additional architectural diversity.

The district is typical of urban 19th-century residential neighborhoods, with densely built housing and narrow streets. The most common architectural style in the district is the Greek Revival, with a significant number of gable-fronted houses dominating the street view. Italianate and Queen Anne styles are also well represented, both in overall house style and as later alterations (typically by the addition of porches and other features) of older buildings.

== See also ==
- National Register of Historic Places listings in New London County, Connecticut
