= Dr. Joshua Lathrop House =

Historic house in Connecticut, United States

- U.S. National Register of Historic Places
- U.S. Historic district – Contributing property
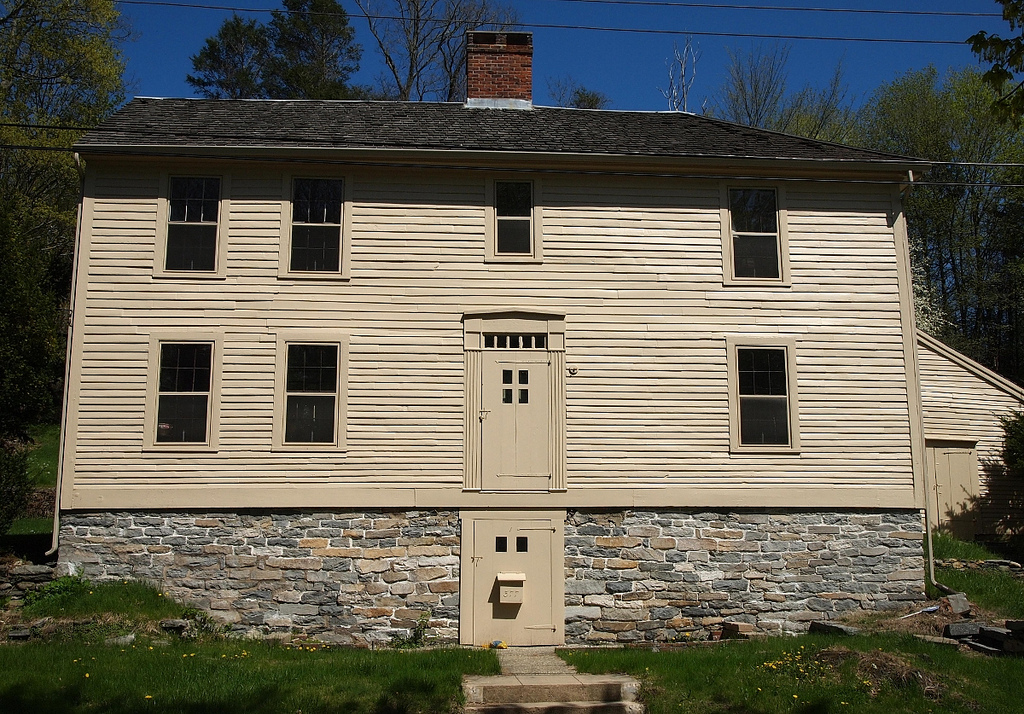

- Location within Connecticut Location within the United States
- Location: 377 Washington Street, Norwich, Connecticut
- Coordinates: 41°32′48″N 72°5′18″W
- Area: 2 acres (0.81 ha)
- Built: 1750
- Architectural style: Colonial, Georgian, Saltbox
- Part of: Norwichtown Historic District (ID730019751)
- NRHP reference No.: 70000727

Significant dates
- Added to NRHP: December 29, 1970
- Designated CP: January 17, 1973

The Dr. Joshua Lathrop House is a historic house at 377 Washington Street in Norwich, Connecticut. Built about 1750, it is an example of Georgian residential architecture of that period and further notable as the home of the first pharmacist in the state, who operated out of these premises. The house was listed on the National Register of Historic Places on December 29, 1970, and is a contributing property to the Norwichtown Historic District.

== Description and history ==
The Dr. Joshua Lathrop House is located in Norwich's historic Norwichtown area, on the east side of Washington Street just south of Lathrop Lane. The house has two parts - an older saltbox section and a more typical Georgian 2 1/2-story frame structure at the front, with a side gable roof and central chimney. The house is built into a hillside, such that the front basement is fully exposed, and the main entrance is now made through an opening in the basement wall below the original entrance. The facade is four bays wide, with an irregular placement that has the entrance at the center, two bays to its left, and one to its right. The lean-to section at the rear is also two stories in height, with irregular placement of windows and doors. The interior retains many original features, including wooden paneling and fireplaces.

The house was built c. 1750 by Joshua Lathrop, who operated a drugstore there with his brother Daniel. This is believed to the first such operation in the Connecticut Colony. Joshua Lathrop remained in partnership with his brother until 1774, and then with his nephews and son until his death in 1807. The house may have further historic significance due to the possibility that Benedict Arnold may have lived here during his apprenticeship with the Lathrops.

== See also ==
- National Register of Historic Places listings in New London County, Connecticut
