= National Register of Historic Places listings in New London County, Connecticut =

Location of New London County in Connecticut

This is a list of the National Register of Historic Places listings in New London County, Connecticut.

This is intended to be a complete list of the properties and districts on the National Register of Historic Places in New London County, Connecticut, United States. The locations of National Register properties and districts for which the latitude and longitude coordinates are included below, may be seen in an online map.

There are 210 properties and districts listed on the National Register in the county, including 13 National Historic Landmarks. One property was once listed, but has since been delisted.

Contents: Counties and municipalities in Connecticut

Fairfield (city of Bridgeport | town of Greenwich | city of Stamford) | Hartford (city of Hartford | town of Southington | town of West Hartford | town of Windsor) | Litchfield | Middlesex (city of Middletown) | New Haven (city of New Haven) | New London | Tolland | Windham

This National Park Service list is complete through NPS recent listings posted October 2, 2026.

== Current listings ==
	Name on the Register	Image	Date listed	Location	City or town	Description
1	Alden Tavern Site	Alden Tavern Site	April 13, 1998 (#98000361)	Town parking lot adjacent to Lebanon Historical Society; 41°38′14″N 72°12′47″W	Lebanon	Site of tavern, tied to the whipping of British General Richard Prescott.
2	American Thermos Bottle Company Laurel Hill Plant	American Thermos Bottle Company Laurel Hill Plant	July 17, 1989 (#88003091)	11 Thermos Avenue; 41°30′37″N 72°04′43″W	Norwich	The American Thermos Bottle Company plant is significant for the adaptive use of a mill design to modern industry. Now renovated, the property has been modernized for a school.
3	Winslow Ames House	Winslow Ames House	March 23, 1995 (#95000283)	132 Mohegan Avenue; 41°22′34″N 72°06′09″W	New London	A 1933 prefabricated Motohome designed by Robert W. McLaughlin, Jr.
4	Anshei Israel Synagogue	Anshei Israel Synagogue	July 21, 1995 (#95000861)	142 Newent Road (CT 138); 41°36′09″N 71°59′38″W	Lisbon	A small one-room Orthodox congregational synagogue constructed in 1936.
5	Applewood Farm	Applewood Farm	October 15, 1987 (#87001765)	528 Colonel Ledyard Highway; 41°25′27″N 71°59′41″W	Ledyard	A farmhouse with Colonial center-chimney design and with Federal style details.
6	Ashlawn	Ashlawn	June 4, 1979 (#79002649)	1 Potash Hill Road; 41°37′48″N 72°02′27″W	Sprague	A two-story, central-hall frame farmhouse dating from the 18th-century
7	Avery Homestead	Avery Homestead	December 14, 1992 (#92001641)	20 Avery Hill Road; 41°27′04″N 72°02′46″W	Ledyard	Built circa 1696, this home is historically significant for its design and the fact that more than twelve generations of the Avery family have resided in the house.
8	Avery House	Avery House	September 4, 1986 (#86001726)	Northeastern corner of Park and Roode Roads; 41°36′28″N 71°54′50″W	Griswold	Believed to have been constructed around 1770, this structure was once in the thriving mill town of Hopeville. Now it serves as the park manager's residence for Hopeville Pond State Park.
9	Avery Point Lighthouse	Avery Point Lighthouse	August 23, 2002 (#02000866)	On Long Island Sound at 1084 Shennecossett Road; 41°19′01″N 72°03′49″W	Groton	A lighthouse dating from 1943, officially listed as the last lighthouse built in Connecticut.
10	Thomas Avery House	Thomas Avery House	August 22, 1979 (#79002637)	33 Society Road; 41°20′59″N 72°13′00″W	East Lyme	A two-and-a-half story clapboarded Greek Revival farmhouse dating to 1845-1846. Also known as the Smith-Harris House.
11	Nathaniel Backus House	Nathaniel Backus House	October 6, 1970 (#70000715)	44 Rockwell Street; 41°32′04″N 72°04′42″W	Norwich	A circa 1750 two-story clapboarded Colonial renovated to a Greek Revival home. Moved to its current location in 1952.
12	Bacon Academy	Bacon Academy	April 27, 1982 (#82004364)	84 Main Street; 41°34′24″N 72°19′59″W	Colchester	A utilitarian three-story Flemish bond brick school with Federal style details that was built in 1803.
13	Baltic Historic District	Baltic Historic District	August 3, 1987 (#87001247)	Roughly bounded by 5th Avenue. River, High, Main, West Main, and the Shetucket River; 41°37′02″N 72°05′06″W	Sprague	
14	Acors Barns House	Acors Barns House	April 22, 1976 (#76001992)	68 Federal Street; 41°21′25″N 72°05′56″W	New London	A two-and-one half story Greek Revival house with a gable roof and clapboarded exterior built in 1837.
15	Bean Hill Historic District	Bean Hill Historic District	December 8, 1982 (#82001006)	Huntington and Vergason Avenues, Sylvia Lane, and West Town Street; 41°33′24″N 72°06′36″W	Norwich	
16	Bennett Rockshelter		July 31, 1987 (#87001223)	Address Restricted	Old Lyme	
17	Gurdon Bill Store	Gurdon Bill Store	April 12, 1982 (#82004368)	15 Church Hill Road; 41°27′26″N 72°00′51″W	Ledyard	
18	Blackledge River Railroad Bridge	Blackledge River Railroad Bridge	July 31, 1986 (#86002109)	Former Air Line Railroad right-of-way and the Blackledge River; 41°35′02″N 72°25′21″W	Colchester	A Warren truss bridge built by the New York, New Haven and Hartford Railroad around 1912.
19	Edward Bloom Silk Company Factory	Edward Bloom Silk Company Factory	March 5, 2021 (#100006266)	90 Garfield Avenue; 41°21′13″N 72°06′31″W	New London	
20	Bozrah Congregational Church and Parsonage	Bozrah Congregational Church and Parsonage	July 26, 1991 (#91000952)	17 and 23 Bozrah Street; 41°33′24″N 72°09′56″W	Bozrah	
21	Bradford-Huntington House	Bradford-Huntington House	October 6, 1970 (#70000720)	16 Huntington Lane; 41°33′06″N 72°05′30″W	Norwich	
22	Branford House	Branford House	January 23, 1984 (#84001158)	Shennecosset and Eastern Point Roads; 41°19′01″N 72°03′52″W	Groton	
23	Brewster Homestead	Brewster Homestead	December 28, 2000 (#00001561)	306 Preston Road; 41°34′25″N 71°58′10″W	Griswold	
24	Bridge No. 1860	Bridge No. 1860	July 29, 1993 (#93000644)	Massapeag Side Road (Route 433) over Shantok Brook; 41°28′48″N 72°05′12″W	Montville	Formerly in Fort Shantok State Park, now Mohegan tribal land.
25	Broad Street School	Broad Street School	January 19, 1984 (#84001162)	100 Broad Street; 41°32′05″N 72°04′35″W	Norwich	
26	William A. Buckingham House	William A. Buckingham House	April 29, 1982 (#82004379)	307 Main Street; 41°31′27″N 72°04′28″W	Norwich	
27	Bulkeley School	Bulkeley School	August 13, 1981 (#81000613)	1 Bulkeley Place; 41°21′31″N 72°06′03″W	New London	
28	Burnett's Corner Historic District	Burnett's Corner Historic District	December 4, 1997 (#97001468)	Along Packer Road, South of CT 184; 41°23′17″N 71°58′45″W	Groton	
29	Burnham Tavern		March 23, 2022 (#100007297)	223 North Burnham Highway (CT 169); 41°37′32″N 72°00′44″W	Lisbon	
30	Carpenter House	Carpenter House	October 14, 1970 (#70000721)	55 East Town Street; 41°33′01″N 72°05′43″W	Norwich	
31	Joseph Carpenter Silversmith Shop	Joseph Carpenter Silversmith Shop	October 6, 1970 (#70000722)	71 East Town Street; 41°32′59″N 72°05′43″W	Norwich	
32	Carroll Building	Carroll Building	November 14, 1982 (#82001007)	9-15 Main Street, and 14-20 Water Street; 41°31′27″N 72°04′48″W	Norwich	
33	Cedar Grove Cemetery		October 16, 2024 (#100010932)	638 Broad Street; 41°21′57″N 72°07′28″W	New London	
34	Central Vermont Railroad Pier	Central Vermont Railroad Pier	January 26, 2005 (#04001551)	State Pier Road; 41°21′35″N 72°05′31″W	New London	
35	Henry Champion House	Henry Champion House	October 10, 1972 (#72001323)	Westchester Road; 41°32′39″N 72°24′50″W	Colchester	Home of Henry Champion.
36	David Chapman Farmstead	David Chapman Farmstead	December 14, 1992 (#92001642)	128 Stoddards Wharf Road; 41°26′46″N 72°02′27″W	Ledyard	
37	CHARLES W. MORGAN	CHARLES W. MORGAN	November 13, 1966 (#66000804)	Mystic Seaport; 41°21′46″N 71°57′55″W	Stonington	In the Mystic section of town Only surviving wooden ship from the nineteenth-century American whaling fleet.
38	Capt. Richard Charlton House	Capt. Richard Charlton House	October 15, 1970 (#70000723)	12 Mediterranean Lane; 41°33′04″N 72°05′40″W	Norwich	
39	Chelsea Parade Historic District	Chelsea Parade Historic District	May 12, 1989 (#88003215)	Roughly bounded by Crescent, Broad, Grove, McKinley, Perkins, Slater, Buckingham, Maple Grove, Washington, and Lincoln; 41°32′01″N 72°04′55″W	Norwich	
40	Civic Institutions Historic District	Civic Institutions Historic District	April 16, 1990 (#90000602)	156-158, 171, and 173-175 Garfield Avenue, 179 Colman Street, 32 Wald Avenue; 41°21′15″N 72°06′42″W	New London	
41	Clark Homestead	Clark Homestead	December 1, 1978 (#78002875)	South of Lebanon on Madley Road; 41°37′34″N 72°12′54″W	Lebanon	
42	Andrew Clark House	Andrew Clark House	June 28, 1979 (#79002636)	Ross Hill Road; 41°36′35″N 71°59′57″W	Lisbon	
43	Edward Cogswell House	Edward Cogswell House	December 15, 1993 (#93001378)	1429 Hopeville Road; 41°35′07″N 71°54′08″W	Griswold	
44	Coit Street Historic District	Coit Street Historic District	February 19, 1988 (#88000068)	Roughly bounded by Coit Street, Washington, Tilley Street, Bank Street, and Reed Street; 41°21′05″N 72°06′01″W	New London	
45	Colchester Village Historic District	Colchester Village Historic District	April 4, 1994 (#94000254)	Roughly along Broadway, Hayward, Linwood and Norwich Avenues, Cragin Court, Pierce Lane, Stebbins Road, Main and South Main Streets; 41°34′21″N 72°19′13″W	Colchester	
46	Commonwealth Works Site	Commonwealth Works Site	April 13, 1998 (#98000360)	Near Yantic Falls	Norwich	Early industrial site at Yantic Falls
47	Converse House and Barn	Converse House and Barn	October 6, 1970 (#70000716)	185 Washington Street; 41°32′03″N 72°05′00″W	Norwich	
48	Cooper Site		October 15, 1987 (#87001224)	Address Restricted	Lyme	
49	Antone DeSant Houses		September 12, 2025 (#100012215)	745 and 751–753 Bank Street; 41°20′57″N 72°06′20″W	New London	
50	Deshon-Allyn House	Deshon-Allyn House	October 28, 1970 (#70000700)	613 Williams Street; 41°22′21″N 72°06′19″W	New London	
51	Downtown New London Historic District	Downtown New London Historic District	April 13, 1979 (#79002665)	Roughly bounded by State, Bank, Tilley and Washington Streets; 41°21′10″N 72°05′47″W	New London	
52	Downtown Norwich Historic District	Downtown Norwich Historic District	April 4, 1985 (#85000707)	Roughly bounded by Union Square, Park, Main and Shetucket Streets, and Washington Square; 41°31′26″N 72°04′38″W	Norwich	
53	East District School	East District School	October 28, 1970 (#70000717)	365 Washington Street; 41°32′46″N 72°05′20″W	Norwich	
54	Eastern Point Historic District		October 4, 1979 (#08000499)	Roughly along Eastern Point Rd. 41°19′18″N 72°04′20″W	Groton	
55	EMMA C. BERRY (Fishing Sloop)	EMMA C. BERRY (Fishing Sloop)	October 12, 1994 (#94001649)	Greenmanville Avenue; 41°21′35″N 71°58′00″W	Stonington	In the Mystic section of town One of the oldest surviving commercial vessels in the United States
56	Eolia-Harkness Estate	Eolia-Harkness Estate	November 20, 1986 (#86003331)	Great Neck Road; 41°18′17″N 72°06′47″W	Waterford	
57	Capt. Thomas Fanning Farmstead	Capt. Thomas Fanning Farmstead	December 14, 1992 (#92001643)	1004 Shewville Road; 41°28′49″N 71°59′34″W	Ledyard	
58	Abel H. Fish House	Abel H. Fish House	March 2, 1982 (#82004381)	Buckley Hill and Rathbun Hill Roads; 41°31′47″N 72°14′55″W	Salem	
59	Fort Griswold	Fort Griswold	October 6, 1970 (#70000694)	Bounded by Baker Avenue, Smith Street, Park Avenue, Monument Avenue, and the Thames River; 41°21′12″N 72°04′54″W	Groton	
60	Fort Shantok	Fort Shantok	March 20, 1986 (#86000469)	Massapeag Side Road (State Route 433); 41°28′40″N 72°04′40″W	Montville	Mohegan settlement and home of the seventeenth century sachem Uncas. Park open to the public.
61	Fort Trumbull	Fort Trumbull	September 22, 1972 (#72001333)	Fort Neck; 41°20′40″N 72°05′40″W	New London	
62	Gales Ferry Historic District No. 1	Gales Ferry Historic District No. 1	December 14, 1992 (#92001639)	Junction of Hurlbutt Road and Riverside Place; 41°25′48″N 72°05′34″W	Ledyard	
63	Gales Ferry Historic District No. 2	Gales Ferry Historic District No. 2	August 22, 2002 (#02000865)	Roughly along Hurlbutt Road, from Allyn Road to Military Highway; 41°25′42″N 72°05′17″W	Ledyard	
64	William Gorton Farm	William Gorton Farm	April 5, 1984 (#84001166)	14 West Lane; 41°17′24″N 72°12′21″W	East Lyme	
65	Graniteville Historic District	Graniteville Historic District	August 28, 2003 (#03000812)	Rope Ferry Road; 41°20′06″N 72°09′13″W	Waterford	Info available at Connecticut Trust for Historic Preservation
66	Greeneville Historic District	Greeneville Historic District	September 21, 2005 (#05001047)	Roughly along Boswell and Central Avenues, Prospect and North Main Streets, between Hickory and 14th Streets; 41°32′05″N 72°03′31″W	Norwich	Info available at Connecticut Trust for Historic Preservation
67	Griswold Point Historic District		February 10, 2023 (#100008625)	Over 200 acres (81 ha) at the confluence of the Black Hall and Connecticut Rivers; 41°17′04″N 72°18′45″W	Old Lyme	Landscape preserving centuries of prehistoric and historic land use patterns.
68	Florence Griswold House and Museum	Florence Griswold House and Museum	April 19, 1993 (#93001604)	96 Lyme Street; 41°19′31″N 72°19′39″W	Old Lyme	Boarding house frequented by American impressionist artists such as Henry Ward Ranger, Childe Hassam, and Willard Metcalf.
69	Groton Bank Historic District	Groton Bank Historic District	March 24, 1983 (#83001287)	Roughly bounded by the Thames River, Broad, Cottage, and Latham Streets; 41°21′24″N 72°04′55″W	Groton	
70	Hadlyme Ferry Historic District	Hadlyme Ferry Historic District	December 21, 1994 (#94001444)	150, 151, 158, 159, 162-1, 162-2 Ferry Road and ferry slip 41°25′09″N 72°25′41″W	Lyme	It is located in the area of, and may include, the Chester–Hadlyme Ferry
71	Hadlyme North Historic District	Hadlyme North Historic District	December 8, 1988 (#88002686)	Roughly bounded by CT 82, Town Street, Banning Road, and Old Town Street; 41°25′45″N 72°24′25″W	Lyme	
72	Hallville Mill Historic District	Hallville Mill Historic District	August 22, 1996 (#96000913)	Hallville Road, Hall's Mill Road, and CT 2A on Hallville Pond; 41°29′40″N 72°02′00″W	Preston	
73	Hamburg Bridge Historic District	Hamburg Bridge Historic District	March 10, 1983 (#83001288)	Joshuatown Road and Old Hamburg Road; 41°23′36″N 72°21′09″W	Lyme	
74	Hamburg Cove Site		October 15, 1987 (#87001225)	Address Restricted	Lyme	
75	Jonathan Newton Harris House	Jonathan Newton Harris House	April 27, 1982 (#82004375)	130 Broad Street; 41°21′27″N 72°06′17″W	New London	
76	Hartford Colony	Hartford Colony	July 1, 2005 (#04000414)	Roughly Leonard Court, New Shore Road, and Shore Road; 41°18′19″N 72°08′26″W	Waterford	
77	Hayward House	Hayward House	October 18, 1972 (#72001325)	9 Hayward Avenue; 41°34′29″N 72°19′53″W	Colchester	
78	Hempstead Historic District	Hempstead Historic District	July 31, 1986 (#86002112)	Roughly bounded by Franklin Street, Jay Street, and Mountain Avenue; 41°21′13″N 72°06′13″W	New London	
79	Joshua Hempstead House	Joshua Hempstead House	October 15, 1970 (#70000701)	11 Hempstead Street; 41°21′09″N 72°06′08″W	New London	
80	Nathaniel Hempstead House	Nathaniel Hempstead House	December 2, 1970 (#70000702)	Corner of Jay, Hempstead, Coit, and Truman Streets; 41°21′06″N 72°06′09″W	New London	Also known as the Old Huguenot House.
81	House at 130 Mohegan Avenue	House at 130 Mohegan Avenue	October 28, 2009 (#08001379)	130 Mohegan Avenue; 41°22′29″N 72°06′09″W	New London	
82	Hodges Square Historic District	Hodges Square Historic District	October 10, 2017 (#100001733)	Bolles, Eastern, Central, Crystal & Terrace Avenues, Bragaw, Williams, Rosemary, Grove & Adelaide Streets; 41°21′58″N 72°06′01″W	New London	
83	Huntington Street Baptist Church	Huntington Street Baptist Church	April 12, 1982 (#82004377)	29 Huntington Street; 41°21′12″N 72°05′57″W	New London	
84	Col. Joshua Huntington House	Col. Joshua Huntington House	February 23, 1972 (#72001343)	11 Huntington Lane; 41°33′04″N 72°05′27″W	Norwich	
85	Gen. Jedidiah Huntington House	Gen. Jedidiah Huntington House	October 6, 1970 (#70000724)	23 East Town Street; 41°33′01″N 72°05′28″W	Norwich	
86	Gov. Samuel Huntington House	Gov. Samuel Huntington House	October 6, 1970 (#70000725)	34 East Town Street; 41°33′01″N 72°05′31″W	Norwich	
87	Jail Hill Historic District	Jail Hill Historic District	April 19, 1999 (#99000431)	Roughly along Cedar, School, Fountain, Happy, and John Streets; 41°31′38″N 72°04′47″W	Norwich	
88	Jordan Village Historic District	Jordan Village Historic District	August 23, 1990 (#90001289)	Junction of North Road and Avery Lane with Rope Ferry Road; 41°20′23″N 72°08′33″W	Waterford	
89	Kinne Cemetery	Kinne Cemetery	April 12, 2001 (#01000351)	Jarvis Road; 41°33′24″N 71°53′15″W	Griswold	
90	L.A. DUNTON	L.A. DUNTON	November 4, 1993 (#93001612)	Mystic Seaport Museum; 41°21′30″N 71°57′58″W	Stonington	In the Mystic section of town Classic fishing schooner and one of the last sail-powered fishing vessels built.
91	Lamb Homestead	Lamb Homestead	September 3, 1991 (#91001175)	47 Lambtown Road; 41°24′21″N 72°00′47″W	Ledyard	
92	Dr. Daniel Lathrop School	Dr. Daniel Lathrop School	December 29, 1970 (#70000726)	69 East Town Street; 41°32′59″N 72°05′43″W	Norwich	
93	Dr. Joshua Lathrop House	Dr. Joshua Lathrop House	December 29, 1970 (#70000727)	377 Washington Street; 41°32′48″N 72°05′18″W	Norwich	
94	Lathrop-Mathewson-Ross House	Lathrop-Mathewson-Ross House	April 15, 1982 (#82004370)	Ross Hill Road; 41°37′19″N 71°59′27″W	Lisbon	
95	Laurel Hill Historic District	Laurel Hill Historic District	October 26, 1987 (#87000516)	Roughly bounded by Spruce Street, Rogers and River Avenues, and Talman Street; 41°31′04″N 72°04′29″W	Norwich	
96	Lebanon Green Historic District	Lebanon Green Historic District	June 4, 1979 (#79002666)	CT 87 and West Town Street; 41°38′26″N 72°13′08″W	Lebanon	
97	Thomas Lee House	Thomas Lee House	October 6, 1970 (#70000693)	CT 156 and Giant's Neck Road; 41°19′03″N 72°14′20″W	East Lyme	
98	Leffingwell Inn	Leffingwell Inn	December 29, 1970 (#70000728)	348 Washington Street; 41°32′32″N 72°05′17″W	Norwich	
99	Nathan Lester House	Nathan Lester House	June 30, 1972 (#72001328)	Vinegar Hill Road; 41°25′24″N 72°03′08″W	Ledyard	
100	Timothy Lester Farmstead	Timothy Lester Farmstead	December 4, 1998 (#98001441)	Junction of Crary, Browning and Terry Roads; 41°34′03″N 71°57′32″W	Griswold	
101	Lieutenant River III Site		July 31, 1987 (#87001227)	Address Restricted	Old Lyme	
102	Lieutenant River IV Site		July 31, 1987 (#87001228)	Address Restricted	Old Lyme	
103	Lieutenant River No. 2		July 31, 1987 (#87001226)	Address Restricted	Old Lyme	
104	Lighthouse Inn	Lighthouse Inn	August 1, 1996 (#96000822)	6 Guthrie Place; 41°19′00″N 72°05′39″W	New London	
105	Little Plain Historic District	Little Plain Historic District	October 15, 1970 (#86003541)	120-156 Broadway and 10-88 Union Street; 41°31′47″N 72°04′37″W	Norwich	
106	Long Society Meetinghouse	Long Society Meetinghouse	April 22, 1976 (#76001996)	45 Long Society Road; 41°32′04″N 72°02′09″W	Preston	
107	Lord Cove Site		October 15, 1987 (#87001229)	Address Restricted	Lyme	
108	Capt. Enoch Lord House	Capt. Enoch Lord House	May 16, 2007 (#07000418)	17 Tantummaheag Road; 41°20′30″N 72°20′35″W	Old Lyme	
109	Lyman Viaduct	Lyman Viaduct	August 21, 1986 (#86002729)	Dickinson Creek and former Boston and New York Air-Line Railroad right-of-way 41°33′49″N 72°27′08″W	Colchester	
110	Main Sawmill	Main Sawmill	April 26, 1972 (#72001332)	175 Iron Street; 41°26′49″N 71°59′14″W	Ledyard	
111	Mashantucket Pequot Reservation	Mashantucket Pequot Reservation	June 11, 1986 (#86001323)	Northeastern Ledyard; 41°27′32″N 71°58′21″W	Ledyard	Encompasses much of the Pequot Reservation lands.
112	Mechanic Street Historic District	Mechanic Street Historic District	June 7, 1988 (#88000653)	Roughly bounded by West Broad Street, Pawcatuck River, Cedar Street, and Courtland Street; 41°22′23″N 71°49′59″W	Stonington	
113	James Merrill House	James Merrill House	August 28, 2013 (#13000618)	107 Water Street; 41°20′01″N 71°54′24″W	Stonington	Designated a National Historic Landmark on October 31, 2016.
114	Mill Brook Bridge	Mill Brook Bridge	January 2, 1997 (#96001498)	Blissville Road, Junction of Mill Brook; 41°33′30″N 72°02′25″W	Lisbon	
115	Samuel Miner House	Samuel Miner House	June 18, 1976 (#76001995)	North of North Stonington off CT 2 on Hewitt Road; 41°26′57″N 71°53′26″W	North Stonington	Destroyed by fire in 2003.
116	Montauk Avenue Historic District	Montauk Avenue Historic District	December 18, 1990 (#90001910)	Roughly bounded by Ocean, Willets, and Riverview Avenues and Faire Harbor; 41°20′20″N 72°06′22″W	New London	
117	Monte Cristo Cottage	Monte Cristo Cottage	July 17, 1971 (#71001010)	325 Pequot Avenue; 41°19′55″N 72°05′47″W	New London	Summer home of playwright Eugene O'Neill
118	Mystic Bank	Mystic Bank	August 8, 2014 (#14000476)	39 Main Street; 41°23′25″N 71°57′36″W	Old Mystic	
119	Mystic Bridge Historic District	Mystic Bridge Historic District	August 31, 1979 (#79002671)	U.S. Route 1 in Connecticut and CT 27; 41°21′25″N 71°57′51″W	Stonington	In the Mystic section of town
120	Mystic River Historic District	Mystic River Historic District	August 24, 1979 (#79002728)	U.S. Route 1 in Connecticut and CT 215; 41°21′15″N 71°58′30″W	Groton	In the Mystic section of town (West Mystic)
121	Natcon Site		July 31, 1987 (#87001230)	Address Restricted	Old Lyme	
122	U.S.S. NAUTILUS (submarine)	U.S.S. NAUTILUS (submarine)	May 16, 1979 (#79002653)	Naval Submarine Base; 41°23′39″N 72°05′34″W	Groton	The world's first operational nuclear-powered submarine.
123	New England Hebrew Farmers of the Emanuel Society Synagogue and Creamery Site	New England Hebrew Farmers of the Emanuel Society Synagogue and Creamery Site	February 28, 2012 (#12000039)	Junction of CT 161 & CT 85; 41°25′40″N 72°12′55″W	Montville	
124	New London County Courthouse	New London County Courthouse	October 15, 1970 (#70000705)	70 Huntington Street; 41°21′18″N 72°06′01″W	New London	
125	New London Customhouse	New London Customhouse	October 15, 1970 (#70000706)	150 Bank Street; 41°21′08″N 72°05′46″W	New London	
126	New London Harbor Lighthouse	New London Harbor Lighthouse	May 29, 1990 (#89001470)	Pequot Avenue at Lighthouse Point; 41°18′59″N 72°05′25″W	New London	
127	New London Ledge Lighthouse	New London Ledge Lighthouse	May 29, 1990 (#89001471)	Thames River New London Harbor; 41°18′20″N 72°04′41″W	Groton	
128	New London Public Library	New London Public Library	October 15, 1970 (#70000712)	63 Huntington Street; 41°21′18″N 72°06′00″W	New London	
129	New London Railroad Station	New London Railroad Station	June 28, 1971 (#71000913)	35 Water Street; 41°21′15″N 72°05′36″W	New London	
130	Noank Historic District	Noank Historic District	August 10, 1979 (#79002656)	Main Street; 41°19′28″N 71°59′20″W	Groton	
131	North Stonington Village Historic District	North Stonington Village Historic District	March 17, 1983 (#83001289)	CT 2, Main Street, Wyassup, Babcock, Caswell, and Rocky Hollow Roads; 41°26′26″N 71°52′59″W	North Stonington	
132	Norwich Hospital District	Norwich Hospital District	January 22, 1988 (#87002424)	CT 12; 41°29′22″N 72°04′26″W	Norwich-Preston	
133	Norwich Town Hall	Norwich Town Hall	December 22, 1983 (#83003589)	Union Street and Broadway; 41°31′34″N 72°04′34″W	Norwich	
134	Norwichtown Historic District	Norwichtown Historic District	January 17, 1973 (#73001951)	Roughly bounded by Huntington Lane, Scotland Road, and Washington, Town and East Town Streets; 41°32′52″N 72°05′33″W	Norwich	
135	William Noyes Farmstead	William Noyes Farmstead	December 14, 1992 (#92001644)	340 Gallup Hill Road; 41°24′30″N 71°58′01″W	Ledyard	
136	Occum Hydroelectric Plant and Dam	Occum Hydroelectric Plant and Dam	December 6, 1996 (#96001459)	North of Bridge Street, on the Western Side of the Shetucket River; 41°35′49″N 72°03′01″W	Norwich and Sprague	
137	Ohev Sholem Synagogue	Ohev Sholem Synagogue	May 11, 1995 (#95000562)	109 Blinman Street; 41°21′04″N 72°06′09″W	New London	
138	Oil Mill Historic District		February 2, 2023 (#100008593)	Gurley, Oil Mill, and Boston Post Roads; 41°22′20″N 72°11′31″W	Waterford	
139	Old Lyme Historic District	Old Lyme Historic District	October 14, 1971 (#71000916)	Lyme Street from Shore Road to Sill Lane, Old Boston Post Road from Sill Lane to Rose Lane; 41°19′18″N 72°19′40″W	Old Lyme	
140	Oswegatchie Historic District	Oswegatchie Historic District	September 15, 2005 (#05001043)	East Street, Riverside, Plant, Park Drives, and Sharwandassee and Oswegatchie Roads; 41°21′07″N 72°11′05″W	Waterford	
141	Capt. Nathaniel B. Palmer House	Capt. Nathaniel B. Palmer House	June 19, 1996 (#96000971)	40 Palmer Street; 41°20′34″N 71°54′28″W	Stonington	Home of pioneering Antarctic explorer and seal hunter Nathaniel Palmer.
142	John Palmer House	John Palmer House	January 12, 2005 (#04001461)	291 North Burnham Highway; 41°37′51″N 72°00′21″W	Lisbon	
143	Luther Palmer House		October 4, 1979 (#08000498)	812 Pendleton Hill Road (CT 49); 41°30′29″N 71°50′22″W	North Stonington	
144	William Park House	William Park House	March 7, 2007 (#07000106)	330 Main Street; 41°38′42″N 72°03′57″W	Sprague	
145	Peck Tavern	Peck Tavern	April 12, 1982 (#82004380)	1 Sill Lane; 41°19′49″N 72°19′30″W	Old Lyme	
146	Pequot Colony Historic District		December 1, 1988 (#88002692)	Roughly bounded by Gardner, Pequot, Glenwood, and Montauk Aves. 41°19′23″N 72°05′29″W	New London	
147	Pequot Fort	Pequot Fort	January 19, 1990 (#89002294)	Pequot Avenue; 41°21′35″N 71°58′36″W	Groton	
148	Pequotsepos Manor	Pequotsepos Manor	June 15, 1979 (#79002650)	120 Pequotsepos Road; 41°21′46″N 71°56′54″W	Stonington	In the Mystic section of town
149	Perkins-Bill House	Perkins-Bill House	July 20, 2000 (#00000817)	1040 Long Cove Road; 41°24′34″N 72°04′36″W	Ledyard	
150	Perkins-Rockwell House	Perkins-Rockwell House	October 17, 1985 (#85003144)	42 Rockwell Street; 41°32′05″N 72°04′45″W	Norwich	
151	Morton Freeman Plant Hunting Lodge	Morton Freeman Plant Hunting Lodge	December 12, 1988 (#88002691)	56 Stone Ranch Road; 41°21′25″N 72°15′59″W	East Lyme	
152	Poquetanuck Village Historic District	Poquetanuck Village Historic District	August 22, 1996 (#96000912)	Roughly along Main Street between CT 117 and Middle Road and along School House and Cider Mill Road; 41°29′14″N 72°02′31″W	Preston	Poquetanuck is a populated place with a long history as a "typical small New England village"
153	Post Hill Historic District	Post Hill Historic District	August 5, 1993 (#93000812)	Roughly bounded by Broad, Center, Vauxhall, Berkeley, Fremont, and Walker Streets; 41°21′37″N 72°06′17″W	New London	
154	Preston City Historic District	Preston City Historic District	July 31, 1987 (#87000452)	Amos and Old Shetucket Roads, Northwest Corner Road, and CT 164; 41°31′38″N 71°58′33″W	Preston	
155	Prospect Street Historic District	Prospect Street Historic District	July 31, 1986 (#86002114)	Roughly bounded by Bulkeley Place, Huntington, Federal, and Hempstead Streets; 41°21′27″N 72°06′02″W	New London	
156	Quaker Hill Historic District	Quaker Hill Historic District	April 11, 2002 (#02000337)	Roughly along Old Norwich Road from Richards Grove Road to Mohegan Avenue Parkway; 41°24′12″N 72°06′35″W	Waterford	
157	John Randall House	John Randall House	December 1, 1978 (#78002877)	Southeast of North Stonington on CT 2; 41°24′59″N 71°51′37″W	North Stonington	
158	Raymond-Bradford Homestead	Raymond-Bradford Homestead	April 16, 1982 (#82004372)	Raymond Hill Road; 41°29′00″N 72°09′43″W	Montville	
159	River Road Stone Arch Railroad Bridge	River Road Stone Arch Railroad Bridge	August 21, 1986 (#86002727)	River Road and former Air Line Railroad right-of-way 41°34′49″N 72°25′32″W	Colchester	
160	Rocky Neck Pavilion	Rocky Neck Pavilion	September 4, 1986 (#86001745)	Lands End Point, Rocky Neck State Park; 41°17′56″N 72°14′48″W	East Lyme	
161	Rossie Velvet Mill Historic District	Rossie Velvet Mill Historic District	March 9, 2007 (#07000110)	Roughly along Bruggerman Court, Bruggerman Place, Greenmanville Avenue, Hinckly Street, Pleasant Street, Rossie Street, and Velvet Street; 41°21′44″N 71°57′48″W	Stonington	In the Mystic section of town
162	SABINO (steamer)	SABINO (steamer)	October 5, 1992 (#92001887)	Mystic Seaport Museum; 41°21′39″N 71°58′02″W	Stonington	In the Mystic section of town One of only two surviving members of the American "mosquito fleet", small steamers that served the inland waters of the United States.
163	St. James Episcopal Church	St. James Episcopal Church	July 21, 2004 (#90001098)	125 Huntington Street; 41°21′26″N 72°05′58″W	New London	
164	Salem Historic District	Salem Historic District	September 22, 1980 (#80004063)	CT 85; 41°29′13″N 72°16′27″W	Salem	
165	Selden Island Site		October 15, 1987 (#87001231)	Address Restricted	Lyme	
166	Seventh Sister	Seventh Sister	July 31, 1986 (#86002103)	67 River Road; 41°25′25″N 72°25′53″W	Lyme	Now known as Gillette Castle.
167	Shaw Mansion	Shaw Mansion	December 29, 1970 (#70000713)	11 Blinman Street; 41°21′02″N 72°06′06″W	New London	
168	Shepherd of the Sea Chapel		March 17, 2025 (#100011538)	231 Gungywamp Road; 41°22′57″N 72°04′07″W	Groton	
169	Slater Library and Fanning Annex	Slater Library and Fanning Annex	January 28, 2002 (#01001529)	26 Main Street; 41°36′30″N 71°59′03″W	Griswold	
170	Jabez Smith House	Jabez Smith House	May 15, 1981 (#81000615)	259 North Road; 41°21′11″N 72°01′46″W	Groton	
171	Samuel Smith House	Samuel Smith House	June 4, 1979 (#79002668)	82 Plants Dam Road; 41°20′28″N 72°14′52″W	East Lyme	
172	Shubel Smith House	Shubel Smith House	December 20, 1996 (#96001462)	515 Pumpkin Hill Road; 41°25′23″N 71°59′08″W	Ledyard	
173	Springbank	Springbank	August 17, 2001 (#01000880)	69 Neck Road; 41°19′54″N 72°20′16″W	Old Lyme	
174	Robert Stanton House	Robert Stanton House	June 4, 1979 (#79002648)	Green Haven Road; 41°20′03″N 71°51′02″W	Stonington	
175	Capt. Mark Stoddard Farmstead	Capt. Mark Stoddard Farmstead	December 14, 1992 (#92001640)	24 Vinegar Hill Road; 41°26′09″N 72°03′22″W	Ledyard	
176	Stonington Borough Historic District	Stonington Borough Historic District	October 2, 1979 (#08000497)	Roughly along Water and Main Sts. 41°20′10″N 71°54′14″W	Stonington (borough)	Boundary map is in NARA# 132355918 page 86.
177	Stonington Cemetery	Stonington Cemetery	April 19, 2018 (#100002321)	Southeast Corner of North Main Street & Route 1; 41°21′02″N 71°54′11″W	Stonington	
178	Stonington Harbor Lighthouse	Stonington Harbor Lighthouse	January 1, 1976 (#76002000)	7 Water Street; 41°19′42″N 71°54′21″W	Stonington	
179	Stonington High School	Stonington High School	August 17, 1978 (#78002880)	176 South Broad Street; 41°20′04″N 71°54′10″W	Stonington	
180	Taftville	Taftville	December 1, 1978 (#78002878)	North of Norwich at CT 93 and CT 97; 41°34′04″N 72°02′57″W	Norwich	
181	Telephone Exchange Building	Telephone Exchange Building	November 28, 1983 (#83003590)	23 Union Street; 41°31′36″N 72°04′35″W	Norwich	
182	Thames Shipyard	Thames Shipyard	April 17, 1975 (#75001939)	50 Farnsworth Street; 41°22′43″N 72°05′53″W	New London	
183	The Seaside	The Seaside	August 15, 1995 (#95001007)	36 Shore Road; 41°18′08″N 72°07′55″W	Waterford	
184	Simon Tiffany House	Simon Tiffany House	June 30, 1983 (#83001290)	Darling Road; 41°26′37″N 72°18′16″W	Salem	
185	John Trumbull Birthplace	John Trumbull Birthplace	October 15, 1966 (#66000883)	Town Common; 41°38′10″N 72°12′56″W	Lebanon	Home of Connecticut governor Joseph Trumbull and birthplace of his son John Trumbull, the "painter of the Revolution"
186	Dr. Philip Turner House	Dr. Philip Turner House	October 15, 1970 (#70000729)	29 West Town Street; 41°32′55″N 72°05′55″W	Norwich	
187	Uncasville Mill Historic District	Uncasville Mill Historic District	July 19, 2021 (#100006732)	42, 46 Pink Row; 3-35 Crescent Street (odd #s), 5-19 Blumenthal Drive (odd #s), 362 CT 32; 41°26′14″N 72°06′28″W	Montville	
188	Uncasville School	Uncasville School	February 23, 2001 (#00001327)	310 Norwich-New London Turnpike; 41°26′04″N 72°06′42″W	Montville	
189	United States Housing Corporation Historic District	United States Housing Corporation Historic District	April 16, 1990 (#90000603)	Roughly bounded by Colman, Fuller, and West Pleasant Streets, and Jefferson Avenue; 41°21′17″N 72°06′49″W	New London	
190	US Post Office-New London Main	US Post Office-New London Main	January 21, 1986 (#86000124)	27 Masonic Street; 41°21′19″N 72°05′48″W	New London	
191	US Post Office-Norwich Main	US Post Office-Norwich Main	July 17, 1986 (#86002271)	340 Main Street; 41°31′28″N 72°04′19″W	Norwich	
192	Edward Waldo House	Edward Waldo House	November 21, 1978 (#78002879)	96 Waldo Street; 41°39′33″N 72°06′05″W	Scotland and Sprague	Saltbox home of Waldo family from 1715-1971. House located in Windham County, while property extends into New London County.
193	Walnut Grove	Walnut Grove	September 21, 2005 (#05001044)	305 Great Neck Road; 41°18′35″N 72°06′39″W	Waterford	
194	War Office	War Office	October 6, 1970 (#70000695)	West Town Street; 41°38′13″N 72°12′55″W	Lebanon	
195	Whale Oil Row	Whale Oil Row	December 29, 1970 (#70000714)	105-119 Huntington Street; 41°21′22″N 72°06′00″W	New London	
196	Wheeler Block	Wheeler Block	April 16, 1993 (#93000312)	40 Norwich Avenue; 41°34′24″N 72°19′53″W	Colchester	
197	Whitehall Mansion	Whitehall Mansion	April 12, 1979 (#79002647)	42 Whitehall Avenue; 41°22′37″N 71°57′20″W	Stonington	
198	William Clark Company Thread Mill	William Clark Company Thread Mill	December 16, 2008 (#08001190)	21 Pawcatuck Avenue, 12 and 22 River Road; 41°21′37″N 71°50′25″W	Stonington	
199	Williams Memorial Institute	Williams Memorial Institute	January 30, 1978 (#78002876)	110 Broad Street; 41°21′26″N 72°06′13″W	New London	
200	Williams Memorial Park Historic District	Williams Memorial Park Historic District	December 3, 1987 (#87002057)	Roughly bounded by Hempstead, Mercer, Broad, and Williams Streets; 41°21′22″N 72°06′07″W	New London	
201	William Williams House	William Williams House	November 11, 1971 (#71001012)	Junction of CT 87 and 207; 41°38′10″N 72°12′46″W	Lebanon	Home of William Williams, Connecticut delegate to the Continental Congress and signer of the Declaration of Independence
202	John Wilson House	John Wilson House	August 23, 1985 (#85001827)	11 Ashland Street; 41°36′21″N 71°58′50″W	Griswold	
203	Winthrop Mill	Winthrop Mill	November 30, 1982 (#82001008)	Mill Street; 41°21′47″N 72°06′00″W	New London	
204	Woodbridge Farm	Woodbridge Farm	December 1, 1997 (#97001467)	29, 30, and 90 Woodbridge Road; 41°27′40″N 72°18′22″W	Salem	
205	Ashbel Woodward House	Ashbel Woodward House	April 8, 1992 (#92000264)	387 CT 32; 41°36′17″N 72°08′12″W	Franklin	
206	Nathan A. Woodworth House	Nathan A. Woodworth House	June 1, 1982 (#82004378)	28 Channing Street; 41°21′33″N 72°06′20″W	New London	
207	Wylie School	Wylie School	December 19, 1991 (#91001742)	Junction of Ekonk Hill and Wylie School Roads; 41°36′34″N 71°50′38″W	Voluntown	
208	Yantic Falls Historic District	Yantic Falls Historic District	June 28, 1972 (#72001344)	Yantic Street; 41°32′01″N 72°05′19″W	Norwich	
209	Yantic Woolen Company Mill	Yantic Woolen Company Mill	July 25, 1996 (#96000780)	6 Franklin Road; 41°33′38″N 72°07′30″W	Norwich	
210	Edward Yeomans House	Edward Yeomans House	December 22, 1978 (#78002874)	Brook Street; 41°19′49″N 72°00′12″W	Groton	

== Former listing ==
	Name on the Register	Image	Date listed	Date removed	Location	City or town	Description
1	Ashland Mill Bridge	Ashland Mill Bridge	April 1, 1999 (#99000407)	February 2, 2016	Over the Pachaug River, near Ashland Street; 41°31′31″N 71°58′28″W	Griswold	A 65-foot-long (20 m) bridge made by the Berlin Iron Bridge Company

== See also ==
- List of National Historic Landmarks in Connecticut
- National Register of Historic Places listings in Connecticut
