= David Chapman Farmstead =

Historic house in Connecticut

- U.S. National Register of Historic Places
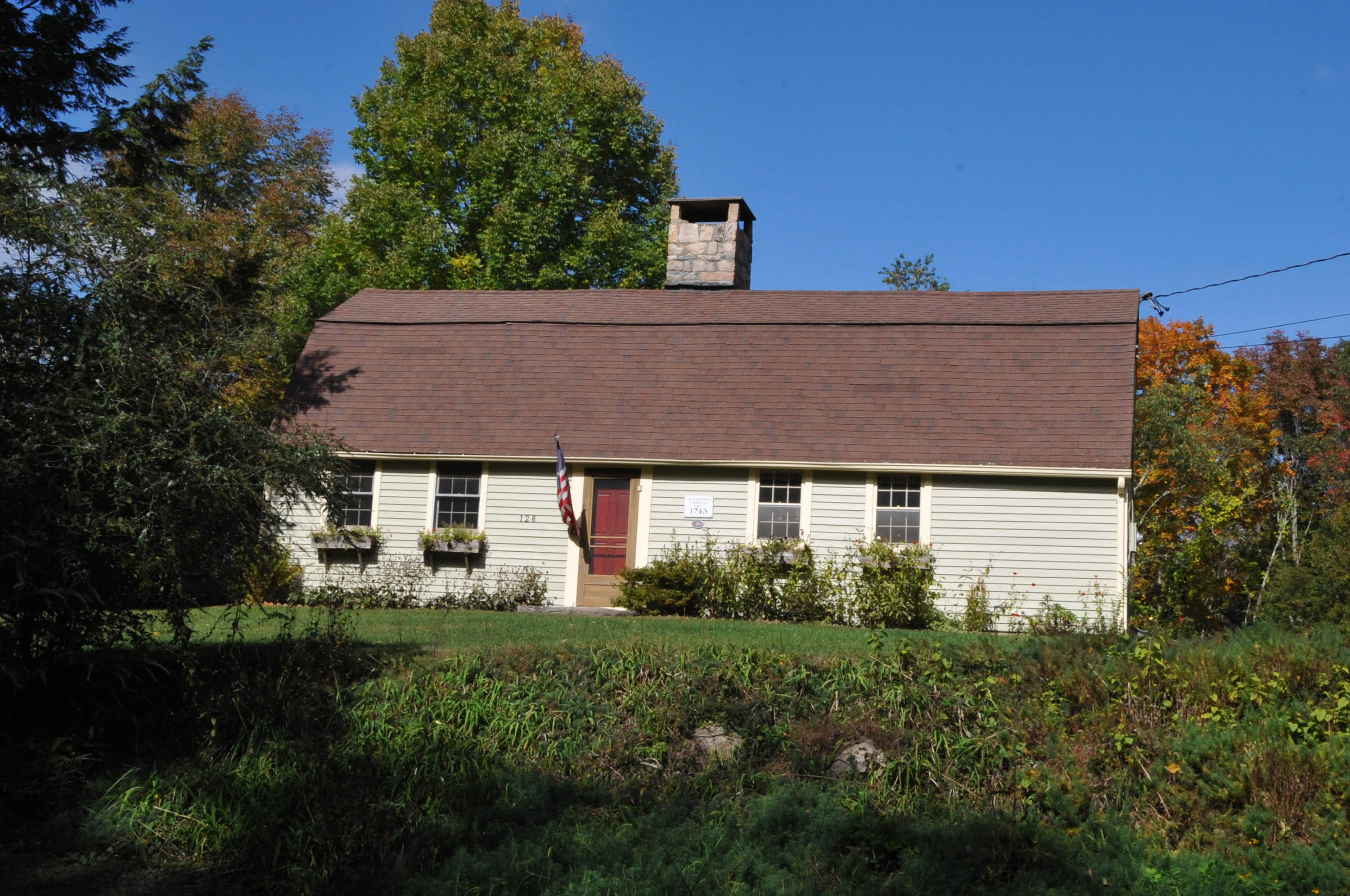

- Location within Connecticut Location within the United States
- Location: 128 Stoddards Wharf Road, Ledyard, Connecticut
- Coordinates: 41°26′46″N 72°02′27″W
- Area: 2 acres (0.81 ha)
- Built: 1744
- Architectural style: Colonial, Postmedieval English
- MPS: Ledyard MPS
- NRHP reference No.: 92001642
- Added to NRHP: December 14, 1992

The David Chapman Farmstead is a historic house at 128 Stoddards Wharf Road in Ledyard, Connecticut, built about 1744. It is a well-preserved example of a vernacular rural farmhouse of the period, built by a descendant of one of Ledyard's early settlers. It was listed on the National Register of Historic Places in 1992.

== Description and history ==
The David Chapman Farmstead is located in a rural setting on the north side of Stoddard Wharf Road, just west of its crossing of Stoddard Brook. It is a 1 1/2-story wood-frame structure, with a gambrel roof, central chimney, and clapboarded exterior. Its main facade is five bays wide, the bays set asymmetrically. The entrance is near the center, and both door and windows butt against the roof eave. The interior of the house has exposed architectural elements showing its construction history.

The house was built in two stages by David Chapman, the grandson of William Chapman, one of the area's early colonial proprietors. The eastern half dates to about 1744 and consisted of a single chamber on the ground floor with a loft in the attic, which was accessed by a ladder. In 1756, Chapman added the western half, probably replacing the original roof with the present gambrel. He may also have built the barn that stands at the back of the property, as the construction methods suggest that it dates to the 18th century.

== See also ==
- National Register of Historic Places listings in New London County, Connecticut
