= Lamb Homestead =

- U.S. National Register of Historic Places
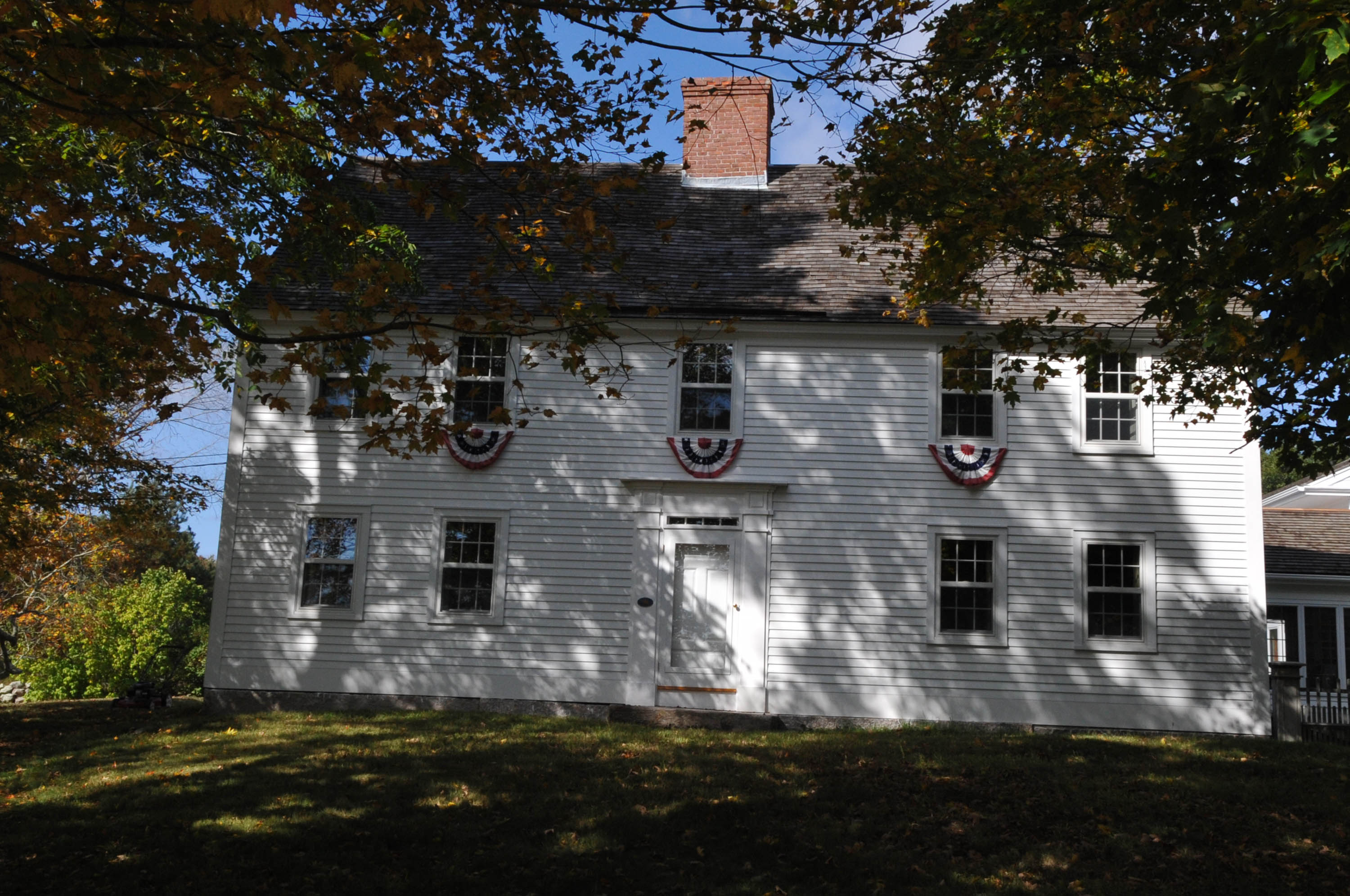

- Location within Connecticut Location within the United States
- Location: 47 Lambtown Road, Ledyard, Connecticut
- Coordinates: 41°24′21″N 72°0′47″W
- Area: 16 acres (6.5 ha)
- Architectural style: New England Colonial
- NRHP reference No.: 91001175
- Added to NRHP: September 3, 1991

The Lamb Homestead is a historic farm property at 47 Lambtown Road in Ledyard, Connecticut. Developed since the early 18th century, it is one of the town's oldest farms, with a long association with the Lamb family, early settlers and important in the development of the Lambtown area of the community. The property was listed on the National Register of Historic Places in 1991.

== Description and history ==
The Lamb Homestead is located in a rural area of southern Ledyard, on Lambtown Road east of Center Groton Road (Connecticut Route 117). The property now consists of about 16 acres (6.5 ha), most of which is south of the road, with the farmhouse on the north side and a barn on the south side. The house is of great antiquity, dated according to family lore to about 1711. It is a 2 1/2-story timber-framed structure, with a side gable roof, central brick chimney, and clapboarded exterior. Its main facade is five bays wide, with a center entrance framed by Federal period pilasters and corniced entablature. Second story windows are set butted against the eave, a typical early-to-mid 18th century placement. The interior retains many 18th-century features, including wide floor boards of oak, pine, and chestnut, a large fireplace hearth in the kitchen, and several doors with original handwrought strap hinges. The house is accompanied by a modern garage and shed. The barn across the street appears to date to about 1900.

The property was, according to family history, settled about 1714 by Isaac Lamb, who had previously owned property in nearby Mystic. The family traditionally gives this date as that for construction of the house, even though many of its finishing features are of later 18th century styles. A house was documented to stand here in 1731, when Lamb's sons divided the property. The Lambs were prominent in the establishment of the Baptist congregation of Groton, the first of that sect in the state, and maintained association with the congregation well into the 19th century. At the time the property (reduced from a maximum of over 300 acres (120 ha)) was listed on the National Register in 1991, it was still held by the Lamb family.

== See also ==
- National Register of Historic Places listings in New London County, Connecticut
