= Williams Memorial Park Historic District =

Historic district in Connecticut, United States

- U.S. National Register of Historic Places
- U.S. Historic district
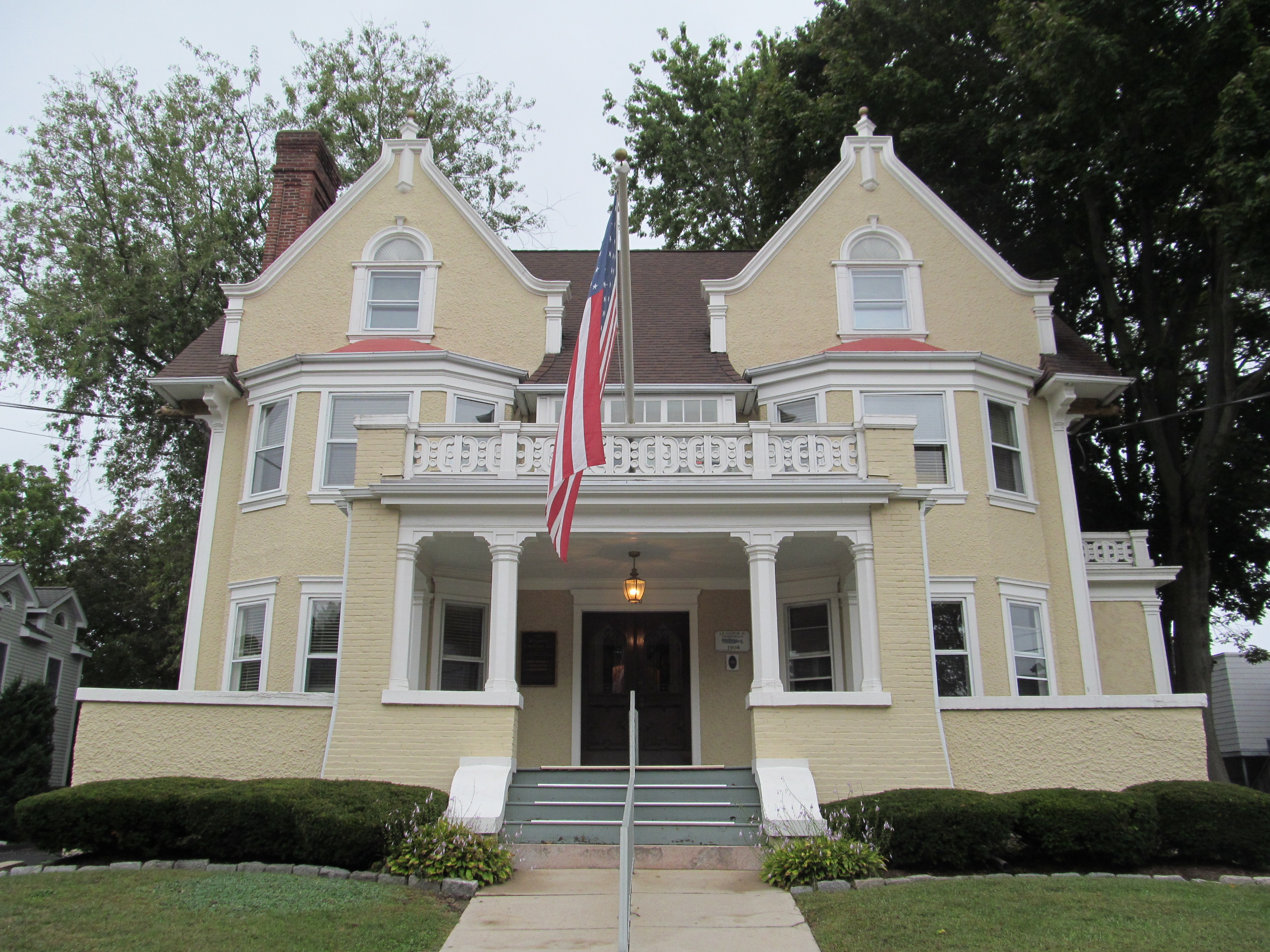
- Leander K. Shipman House

- Location within Connecticut Location within the United States
- Location: Roughly bounded by Hempstead, Mercer, Broad, and Williams Streets, New London, Connecticut
- Coordinates: 41°21′22″N 72°6′7″W
- Area: 8 acres (3.2 ha)
- Architect: Multiple
- Architectural style: Greek Revival, Late Victorian, Tudor Revival
- NRHP reference No.: 87002057
- Added to NRHP: December 3, 1987

The Williams Memorial Park Historic District is located in New London, Connecticut, roughly bounded by Hempstead, Broad, Mercer and Williams Streets, with houses on Broad Street south to Cottage Street included. Williams Memorial Park – which was designed by Frederick Law Olmsted – is also included, as is the Civil War monument located there; 16 houses are part of the district, while two buildings – a brick office building at 43 Broad Street and an apartment building at 127 Hempstead Street, are non-contributing properties. Four of the six outbuildings in the district are contributing. Nine different architectural styles are represented in the district.

The area was developed through the efforts of members of the locally prominent Williams family, whose fortune was made in the whaling industry, and contains some of New London's finest late-19th century architecture. The district was listed on the National Register of Historic Places on December 3, 1987.

== History ==
New London established its Second Burial Ground on 1793, on land that is now Williams Memorial Park. This area was then on the outskirts of the city, and the area around the cemetery consisted of larger estates until the 1830s, when denser residential development began. Land on the west side of the cemetery was developed by Archibald Mercer and Enos Ames, while that on the east was developed by Thomas W. Williams, one of the city's leading whalers, and his business partner Henry Haven. Williams and Haven were major contributors to the construction of the Second Congregational Church, a Gothic Revival building standing just north of the park. Charles Augustus Williams, the son of Thomas, broached the idea of converting the Second Burial Ground into a park in 1885. He retained Frederick Law Olmsted to provide a design for the park, and provided funds for relocating the burials to Cedar Grove Cemetery, and the shutting down of a quarry that had been operating on the site. The park then became an attractive site for large upper-class houses to be located near.

== See also ==
- National Register of Historic Places listings in New London County, Connecticut
