= Huntington (name) =

Huntington is both a surname and a Christian name. Notable people with the name include:

Surname:

- Adin Huntington (born 2002), American football player
- A. K. Huntington (1852–1920), British professor of metallurgy and aviation pioneer
- Anna Hyatt Huntington (1876–1973), American sculptor
- Annette Huntington, New Zealand nursing academic
- Arabella Huntington, wife of Collis Potter Huntington
- Archer Milton Huntington (1870–1955), scholar of Hispanic Studies
- Benjamin Huntington (1736–1800), American jurist and politician
- Benjamin N. Huntington (1816–1882), American farmer, banker, and politician
- Charles A. Huntington (1891–1973), American quarterback and coach
- Charles Pratt Huntington (1871–1919), American architect
- Collis Potter Huntington (1821–1900), American railroad magnate
- Cynthia Huntington, American poet
- Daniel Huntington (artist) (1816–1906), American artist
- Daniel Riggs Huntington (1871–1962), American architect
- Ebenezer Huntington (1754–1834), United States Representative from Connecticut
- Eddy Huntington (born 1965), English pop singer and teacher
- Edward Vermilye Huntington (1874–1952), American mathematician
- Elfie Caroline Huntington (1868–1949), American photographer
- Elisha Huntington (1796–1865), Lieutenant Governor for the Commonwealth of Massachusetts from 1853 to 1854
- Ellsworth Huntington (1876–1947), American geographer
- Frank Atwood Huntington (1836–1925), American inventor
- Frederic Dan Huntington (1819–1904), first Protestant Episcopal bishop of Central New York
- George Huntington (disambiguation), several people
  - George Huntington, provided an early comprehensive description of Huntington's disease
  - George Huntington (Steuben County, NY) (1796–1866), New York politician
  - George Huntington Hartford (1833–1917), American businessman, of A&P supermarkets
  - George Sumner Huntington (1861–1927), American physician
- Henry E. Huntington (1850–1927), railroad magnate and business leader
- Henry of Huntington, English historian of the 12th century and archdeacon of Huntingdon
- Jabez Huntington (colonist) (1719–1786), a merchant of Connecticut Colony
- Jabez W. Huntington (1788–1847), United States Representative and United States Senator from Connecticut
- James Otis Sargent Huntington (1854–1935), founder of the Order of the Holy Cross, an Anglican Benedictine monastic order
- Jedediah Huntington (1743–1818), American general in the Continental Army during the American Revolutionary War
- Jedediah Vincent Huntington (1815–1862), clergyman, novelist
- Joshua Huntington (1786–1819), a Boston clergyman
- Kayla Huntington, fictional character on the ABC television series, Desperate Housewives
- Louise Huntington (1904–1997), stage and screen actress
- Lucius Seth Huntington (1827–1886), Quebec lawyer, journalist and political figure
- Maria Huntington (born 1997), Finnish athlete
- Nora Huntington, a fictional character on the ABC television series, Desperate Housewives
- Paul Huntington (born 1987), English footballer
- Presendia Lathrop Huntington, sixth woman to marry LDS Church founder Joseph Smith Jr.
- Robert Kingsbury Huntington, naval aviator and member of Torpedo Squadron 8 (VT-8)
- Ron Huntington (1921–1998), Canadian politician
- Rosie Huntington-Whiteley (born 1987), British model, actor
- Sam Huntington (born 1982), American actor
- Samuel Huntington (disambiguation), several people
- Selina Hastings, Countess of Huntingdon (1707–1791), English countess
- William R. Huntington (1907–1990), American architect and Quaker representative to the United Nations and director of the UN Quaker program
- Huntington baronets, a title in the Baronetage of England (1906–1928)

Given name:

- Huntington Hardisty (1929–2003), United States Navy admiral
- Huntington Hartford, A&P supermarket heir
- Huntington Willard, American geneticist
- Huntington Wilson (1875–1946), American diplomat and writer
