= Gen. Jedidiah Huntington House =

Historic house in Connecticut, United States

- U.S. National Register of Historic Places
- U.S. Historic district – Contributing property
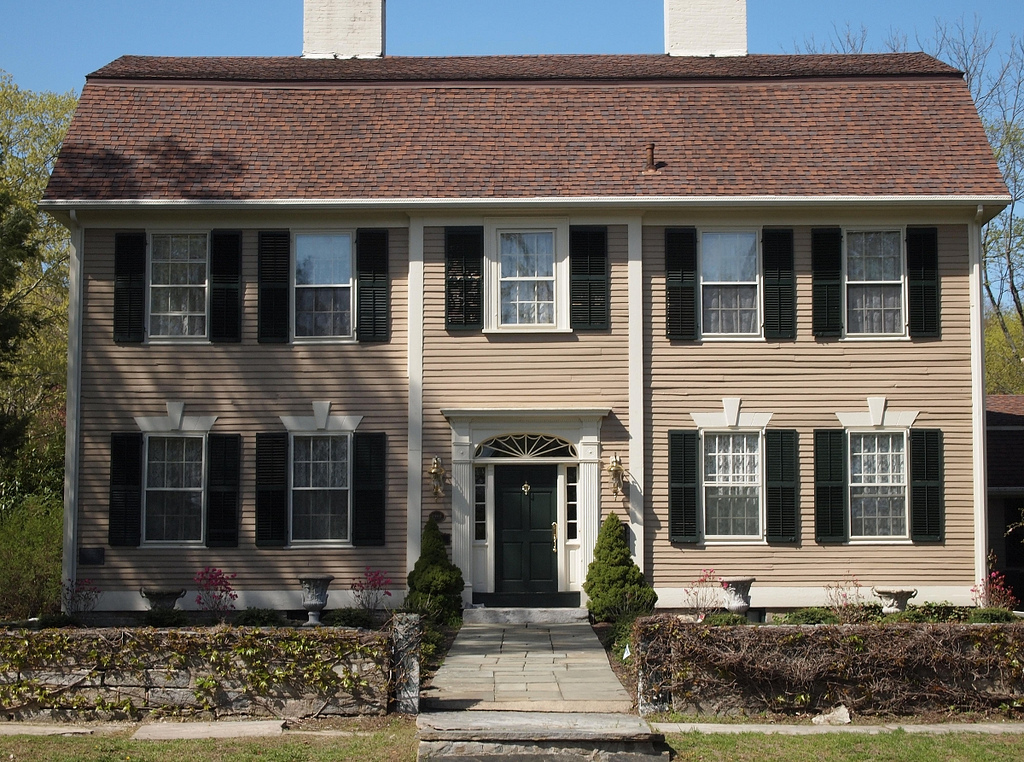

- Location within Connecticut Location within the United States
- Location: 23 East Town Street, Norwichtown, Connecticut
- Coordinates: 41°33′1″N 72°5′28″W
- Area: 2 acres (0.81 ha)
- Built: 1765
- Architectural style: Georgian
- Part of: Norwichtown Historic District (ID73001951)
- NRHP reference No.: 70000724

Significant dates
- Added to NRHP: October 6, 1970
- Designated CP: January 17, 1973

The Gen. Jedidiah Huntington House is a historic house at 23 East Town Road in Norwich, Connecticut. Built in 1765, it is a good example of Georgian residential architecture, notable as the home of Jedidiah Huntington, a general during the American Revolutionary War. The house was listed on the National Register of Historic Places in 1970, and is a contributing property to the Norwichtown Historic District.

== Description and history ==
The General Jedidiah Huntington House is located in the Norwichtown part of Norwich, one its earliest areas of settlement. It is located at the northeast corner of East Town Street and Huntington Lane, on a 2-acre (0.81 ha) lot fringed at the sidewalk by a low stone retaining wall. It is a 2 1/2-story wood-frame structure, five bays wide, with a gable roof, twin brick chimneys, clapboard siding, and a stone foundation. The entry is particularly elaborate, with sidelight windows and pilasters flanking the door, and a semi-elliptical transom window and simple cornice above. The interior follows a typical central hall plan, with a fine central staircase.

The house was built in 1765, and was home to Jedediah Huntington (1743–1818), an American general in the Continental Army during the American Revolutionary War. He served at the Battle of Bunker Hill, in the 1776 New York and New Jersey campaign, and wintered at Valley Forge in 1777–78. At the end of the war he was promoted to major general. He was also politically active, serving as county sheriff and in the state legislature.

== See also ==
- Col. Joshua Huntington House, just to the north
- Gov. Samuel Huntington House, to the southwest
- National Register of Historic Places listings in New London County, Connecticut
