= Joshua Huntington =

American clergyman (1786–1819)

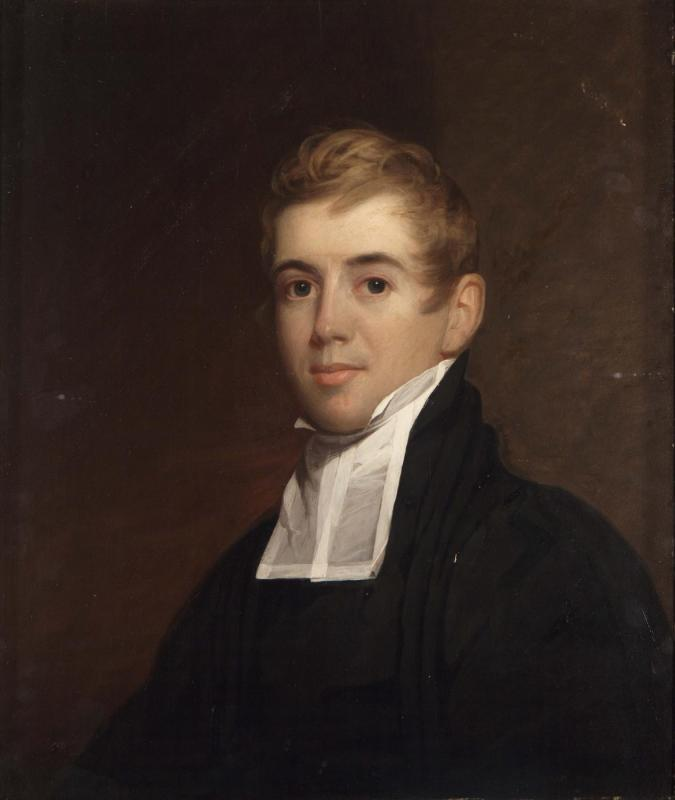
- Born: January 31, 1786
- Died: September 11, 1819
- Education: Yale University
- Occupations: Cleric, Minister
- Spouse: Susan Huntington
- Father: Jedediah Huntington

Joshua Huntington (January 31, 1786, in Norwich, Connecticut – September 11, 1819, in Groton, Massachusetts) was an American clergyman.

== Biography ==
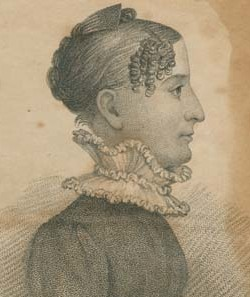
Susan Mansfield Huntington

He was a son of Jedidiah Huntington, a general in the Continental Army during the American Revolutionary War. He graduated from Yale in 1804. He was licensed to preach by the New London Association in September 1806. He was ordained pastor of the Old South Church (then at the Old South Meeting House), Boston, on May 18, 1808, which charge he held until his death.

He was one of the founders of the American Educational Society in 1815, and was president of the Boston Society for the Religious and Moral Instruction of the Poor, which was founded in 1816. He was the author of Life of Abigail Waters (1817).

His wife, Susan Mansfield Huntington (born January 27, 1791; died 1823), wrote a story entitled “Little Lucy.” Her memoirs, with her letters, journal, and poetry, were published by Benjamin B. Wisner (Boston, 1829; republished in Scotland).

Two of his brothers were also preachers. Two of his nephews were Rev. Jedediah Vincent Huntington and artist Daniel Huntington.

== See also ==
- Col. Joshua Huntington House
