= Bradford-Huntington House =

Historic house in Connecticut

- U.S. National Register of Historic Places
- U.S. Historic district – Contributing property
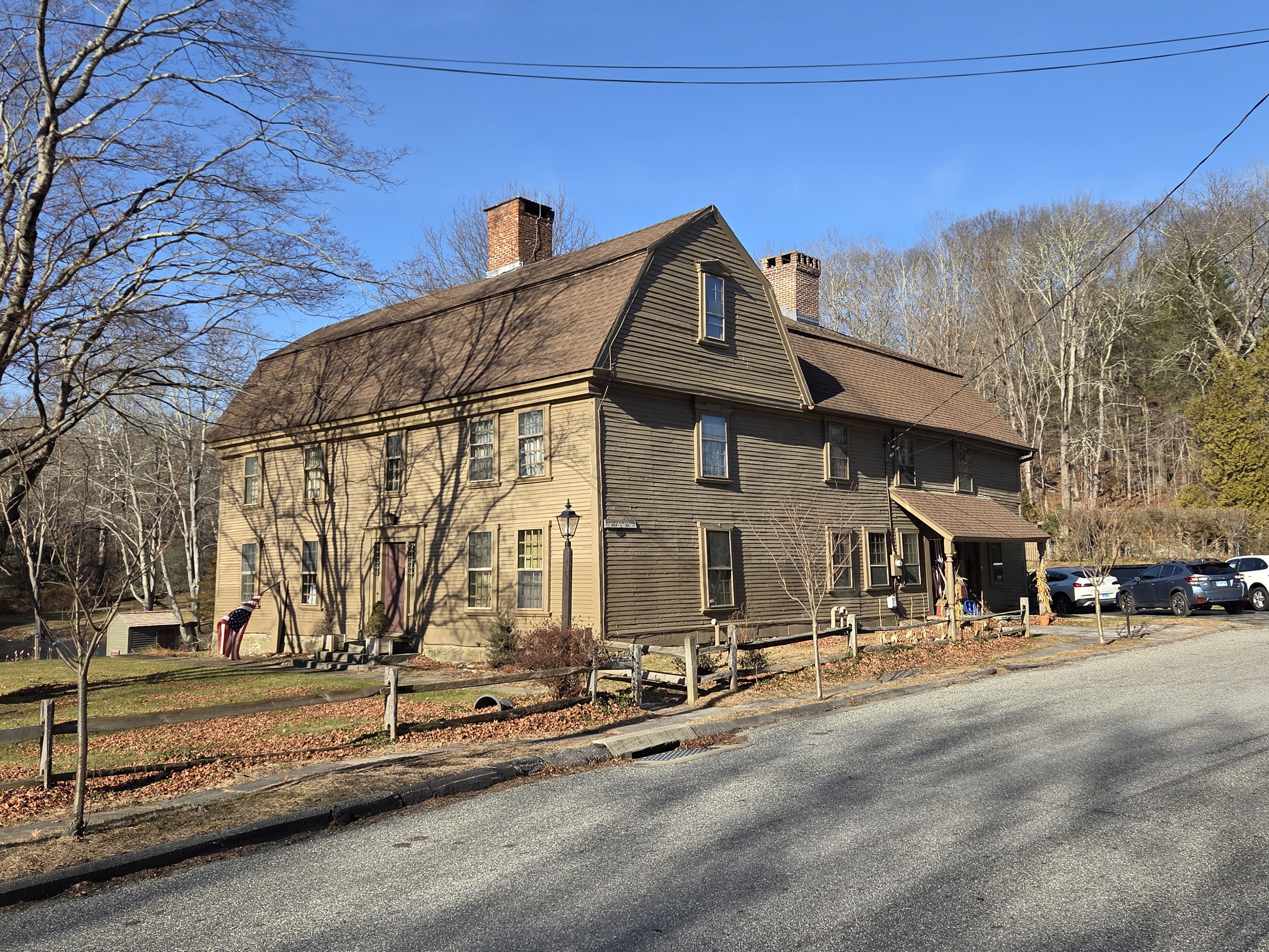
- Bradford-Huntington House in 2025

- Location within Connecticut Location within the United States
- Location: 16 Huntington Lane, Norwich, Connecticut
- Coordinates: 41°33′6″N 72°5′30″W
- Area: 3 acres (1.2 ha)
- Built: 1691
- Architect: Huntington, Simon, Jr.; Bradford, Thomas
- Part of: Norwichtown Historic District (ID730019751)
- NRHP reference No.: 70000720

Significant dates
- Added to NRHP: October 6, 1970
- Designated CP: January 17, 1973

The Bradford-Huntington House is a historic house at 16 Huntington Lane in the Norwichtown section of Norwich, Connecticut. The house was built in stages, beginning around 1691, and is one of the oldest to survive in the area. It was owned by American Revolutionary War officer Jabez Huntington. It is claimed that Huntington hosted George Washington here. The house was listed on the National Register of Historic Places in 1970. It is also a contributing property in the Norwichtown Historic District (which was listed on the National Register in 1973).

== Description and history ==
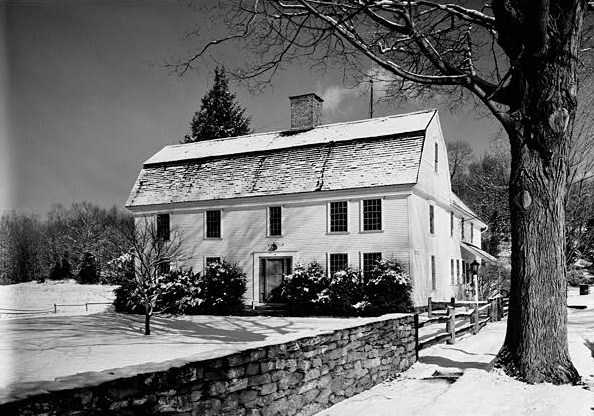
Bradford-Huntington House in 1961

The Bradford-Huntington House is located northeast of the Norwichtown green, on the west side of Huntington Lane. It stands facing south on a stone foundation, with a large brick fireplace and chimney in the middle of each of two gambrel-roofed wings. It is 2 1/2 stories in height, with a gambrel-roofed main section and a clapboarded exterior. The interior has many well-preserved features, including exposed chamfered summer beam, wide floorboards, and a winding staircase in the front entry vestibule.

The oldest portion of the house dates to 1691 at the latest, when it was described as the "new dwelling house" of John Bradford. It was enlarged in stages by members of the Huntington family, who were early settlers of Norwich. Jabez Huntington was the owner in the late 18th century, a major general in the state militia during the American Revolutionary War. In this role, he is believed to have hosted both George Washington and the Marquis de Lafayette at his home. The house is of architectural interest for its complex construction history, exhibiting differing construction methods over time.

== See also ==
Media related to Bradford-Huntington House at Wikimedia Commons

- National Register of Historic Places listings in New London County, Connecticut
- List of the oldest buildings in Connecticut
