= Jabez Huntington =

Jabez Huntington may refer to:

- Jabez W. Huntington (1788–1847), United States Representative and Senator from Connecticut
- Jabez Huntington (colonist) (1719–1786), merchant and politician from Connecticut Colony
