= Carpenter House (Norwich, Connecticut) =

Historic house in Connecticut, United States

- U.S. National Register of Historic Places
- U.S. Historic district – Contributing property
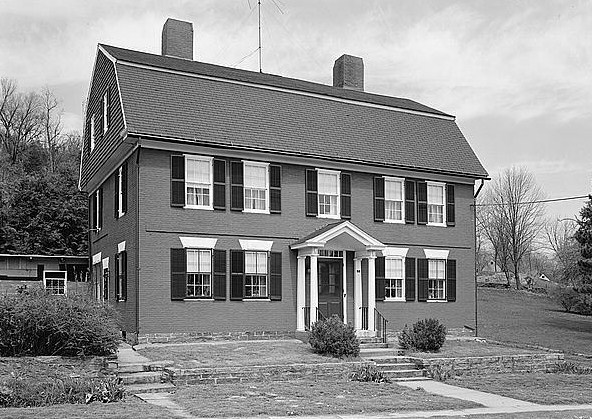
- Carpenter House in 1958

- Location within Connecticut Location within the United States
- Location: 55 East Town Street, Norwich, Connecticut
- Coordinates: 41°33′1″N 72°5′43″W
- Built: 1793
- Architectural style: Georgian
- Part of: Norwichtown Historic District (ID730019751)
- NRHP reference No.: 70000721

Significant dates
- Added to NRHP: October 14, 1970
- Designated CP: January 17, 1973

The Carpenter House, also known as the Gardiner (Gardner) Carpenter House and the Red House, is a Georgian style house in Norwichtown area of Norwich, Connecticut. A house was previously on the site, but it was removed by Gardner Carpenter to construct the house in 1793. The three-story Flemish bond Georgian house's front facade consists of five bays with a gabled porch over the main entrance and supported by round columns. The gambrel roof and third story addition were added around 1816 by Joseph Huntington. In 1958, a modern one-story rear wing was added to the back of the house. The interior of the house is a center hall plan with 10-foot (3.0 m) high ceilings and has been renovated, but retains much of its original molding, paneling and wrought iron hardware. It was listed on the National Register of Historic Places in 1970 and added to the Norwichtown Historic District in 1973.

== History ==
Historical records for Gardner Carpenter's life are sparse in detail, but the Vital records of Norwich, 1659–1848 Part II provide some information. Gardner Carpenter married Mary Huntington, daughter of Benjamin Huntington Jr., on October 29, 1791. Carpenter was a local business man who operated his mercantile business in a shop that was shared with his brother, Joseph Carpenter, the silversmith. The Carpenters' shared shop is historically significant and is known as the Joseph Carpenter Silversmith Shop. A 1906 paper titled Norwich: early homes and history identified Gardner Carpenter as the builder of the store and noted that Gardner Carpenter was one of the first traders of Norwich. In 1793, the house which is now known as the Carpenter House was constructed on the property after a previous house on the land was removed. Gardner and Mary Carpenter would have six children together; their first son, George, was born in 1795 and their first and only daughter, Mary Elizabeth, in 1797. Another son, Gardner Carpenter, was born in 1802 and was followed by Henry in 1804, John in 1807 and Charles in 1810. Gardner Carpenter served as a pay master in the 17th Connecticut Regiment in the American Revolutionary War and he was the postmaster of Norwich from 1799 to 1814, shortly before his death in 1815. His wife, Mary Carpenter, died in 1838. The house was sold to Joseph Huntington after Carpenter's death, who would add a third story around 1816. The house was sold again to Reverend Hiram P. Arms in 1841.

== Design ==
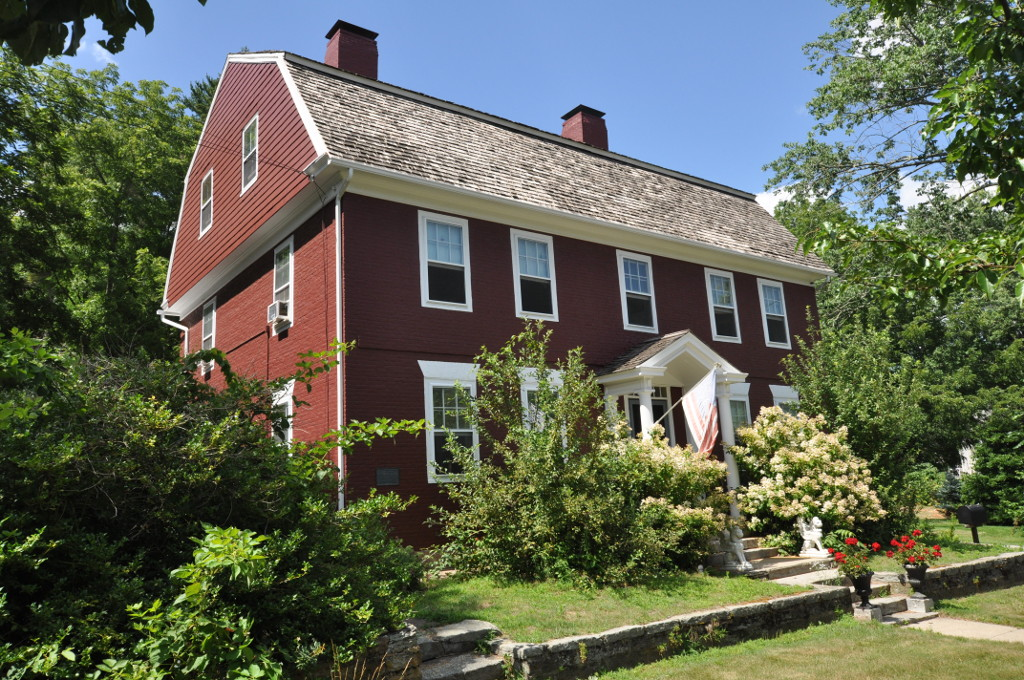
House in 2016

The Georgian house is built on the north end of the Norwichtown green and faces East Town Street. The walls of the three-story house are made of brick laid in Flemish bond and painted a cranberry red. The front facade consist of five bays with a gabled porch over the main entrance and supported by round columns. The doorway is not original, but has a transom of six lights on top. The windows of the house are double hung six-over-six sash with the windows on the first floor have flat splayed lintels mimicking the gabled porch. The third story is also the attack and has an oversized gambrel roof that over hangs the two stories, the roof was covered with asphalt shingles at the time of its nomination in 1970. This addition of the third story was done about 1816 when the house was owned by Joseph Huntington. A modern one-story rear wing is at the back of the house, the last addition dating to 1958. Four chimneys arise from the roof of the house, with two interior chimneys and a rear chimney on the main house with a smaller fourth chimney on the one-story rear addition. The interior of the house is a typical center hall plan which retains much of its original moldings, paneling and wrought iron hardware. The 1958 addition added a 16-foot (4.9 m) by 26-foot (7.9 m) family room.

The interior of the house comprises 3,200 square feet (300 m^{2}) and was renovated sometime after its addition to the National Register of Historic Places in 1970. Circa 1980, the home was purchased by the Chassanoff family and underwent a historical restoration. The Chassanoffs' restoration included removing the wallpaper, applying historic paint colors and stripping and refinishing the original floor's wooden planks. The renovations also included using wood shingles to preserve the authenticity of the house. The interior consists of 11 rooms and includes 10-foot (3.0 m) high ceilings. Four rooms are on the second floor, including a 15-foot (4.6 m) by 16-foot (4.9 m) master bedroom. The house has a total of six known fireplaces with another two likely concealed under plaster. The floors were restored and some planks had to be replaced in the process.

== Importance ==
The house was added to the National Register of Historic Places on October 6, 1970. It was made a part of the Norwichtown Historic District on January 17, 1973, but was unaccredited as a separately listed property at the time. On the district nomination the house is spelled alternatively as the "Gardner House". Luyster writes, "This is a good example of Georgian housing of the colonial period. Its value is increased because of the historical and architectural value of the buildings which surround it since it is located next to the Norwich town green which is the focal point of the historic district in that area." The home was featured as part of a historic house tour in 1993's "More Reflections on the Past." In 2002, the house was available for purchase and remains a private residence as of 2014.

== See also ==
- National Register of Historic Places listings in New London County, Connecticut
