= 1786 Connecticut gubernatorial election =

- April 13, 1786
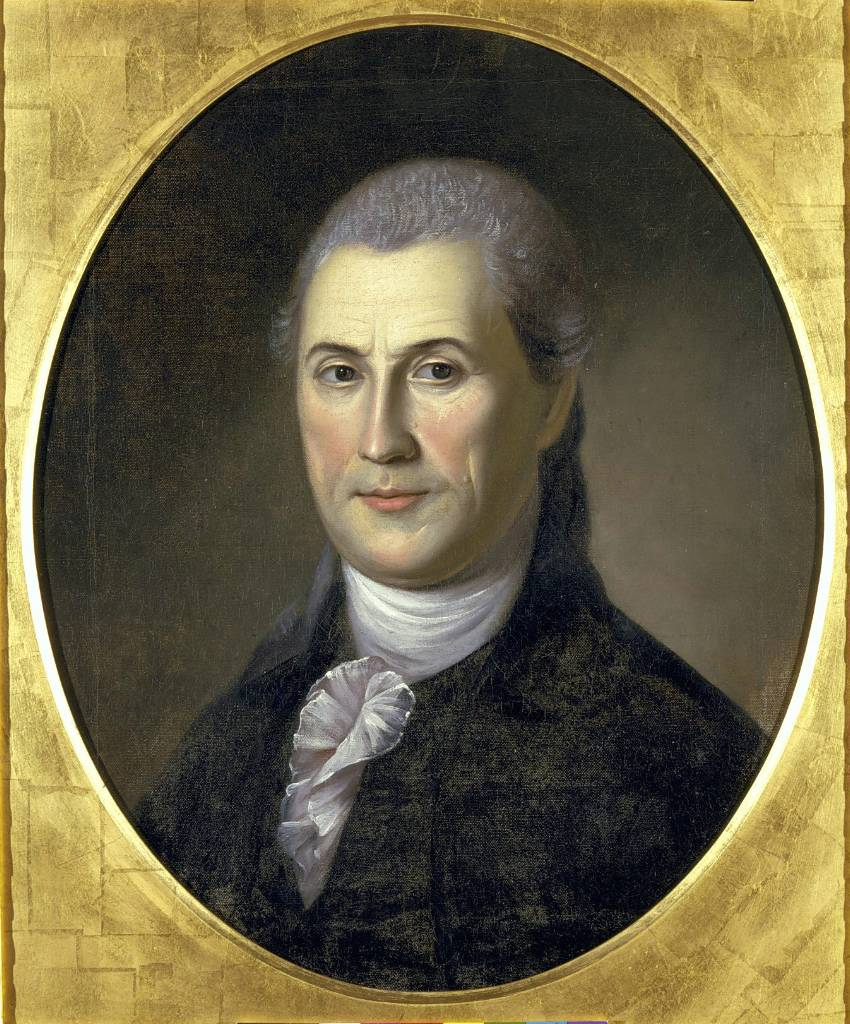
Nominee	Samuel Huntington
Party	Nonpartisan
Popular vote	1,701
Percentage	30.35%
Governor before election
Matthew Griswold
Nonpartisan
Elected Governor
Samuel Huntington
Nonpartisan

The 1786 Connecticut gubernatorial election was held on April 13, 1786, in order to elect the Governor of Connecticut. Incumbent Nonpartisan Lieutenant Governor Samuel Huntington won a plurality of the vote in his gubernatorial election bid against other candidates including incumbent Governor Matthew Griswold. However, as no candidate received a majority of the total votes cast as was required by Connecticut law, the election was forwarded to the Connecticut legislature, who chose Huntington as governor.

== General election ==
On election day, April 13, 1786, incumbent Nonpartisan Lieutenant Governor Samuel Huntington won the election after having been chosen by the Connecticut legislature. Huntington was sworn in as the 18th Governor of Connecticut on May 11, 1786.

=== Results ===
Connecticut gubernatorial election, 1786
Party	Candidate	Votes	%
Nonpartisan	Samuel Huntington	1,701	30.35
	Scattering	3,903	69.65
Total votes		5,604	100.00
Nonpartisan hold			
