= Samuel Huntington =

Samuel Huntington may refer to:

- Samuel Huntington (Connecticut politician) (1731–1796), American jurist, statesman, and revolutionary leader, 18th Governor of Connecticut
- Samuel Huntington (Ohio politician) (1765–1817), American jurist, third Governor of Ohio
- Samuel P. Huntington (1927–2008), American political scientist and historian
- SS Samuel Huntington, an American liberty ship

== See also ==
- Sam Huntington (born 1982), American actor
