= Jedediah Huntington =

American general and politician

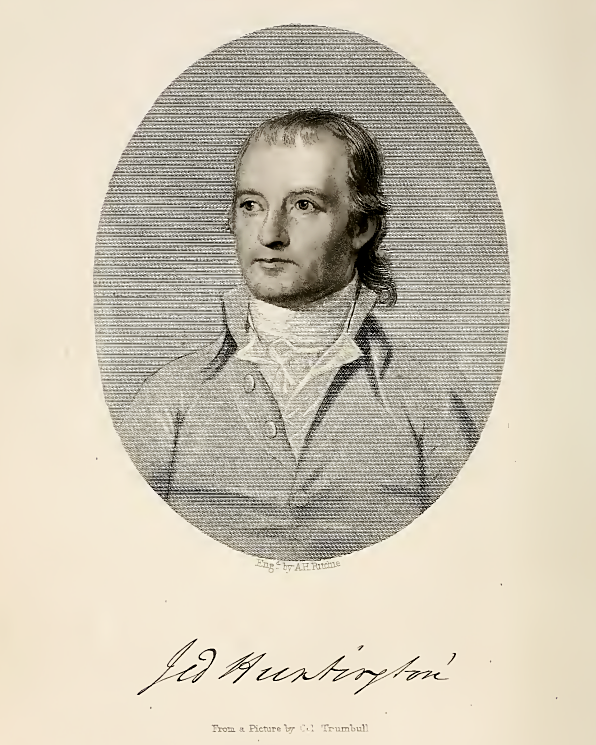

Treasurer of Connecticut
- In office 1789–1790
- Preceded by: John Lawrence
- Succeeded by: Peter Colt

Personal details
- Born: 4 August 1743 Norwich, Connecticut, British America
- Died: September 25, 1818 (aged 75)
- Spouse: Faith Huntington (m. 1766; died 1775)
- Children: Joshua Huntington
- Education: Harvard University; Yale University (MA)

Military service
- Years of service: 1769-1775 (Great Britain); 1775-1776 (United Colonies); 1776-1779 (United States)
- Battles/wars: American Revolutionary War; Siege of Boston; Battle of Ridgefield; Valley Forge; Battle of Monmouth

Jedediah (or Jedidiah) Huntington (4 August 1743 – 25 September 1818), was an American general in the Continental Army during the American Revolutionary War. After the war, he served in numerous civilian posts.

== Early life ==
Huntington was born in Norwich, Connecticut Colony, the son of Jabez and Elizabeth (Backus) Huntington. Huntington graduated from Harvard in 1763 and received a master's degree from Yale University in 1770.

He was engaged in commercial pursuits with his father, was an active member of the Sons of Liberty, and of the Committee of Correspondence established at Norwich on 6 June 1774.

== Appearance ==
He was a slightly built man: "His greatness was rather intellectual and moral than physical, as there is in existence a memorandum of the weighing of several revolutionary officers at West Point, August 19, 1788; when Gen. Washington weighed 209 pounds, Gen. Lincoln, 224, Gen. Knox, 280, and Gen. Huntington, 132." Author Edwin Valentine Mitchell notes that "The diminutive General Huntington, weighing only 132, … appears like a minnow among the whales."

== Military career ==
As the war approached, Huntington became an active officer in the Norwich militia. He was appointed ensign of the first Norwich militia company in October 1769, became a lieutenant in 1771, and a captain in May 1774. In October 1774, Huntington was made Colonel of the 20th Regiment of Connecticut Militia. When Israel Bissell brought the Lexington Alarm to Norwich on April 20, 1775, he personally delivered it to Colonel Huntington, who immediately got his men ready to march. On April 26 they arrived in Wrentham, and a few days later they were in Roxbury and became part of the Siege of Boston.

Around May 20, 1775, Colonel Huntington traveled the 65 miles back to Norwich to put his affairs in order before returning to his command. While there, he arranged for his wife, Faith, and some of the other officer's wives to travel back to Roxbury to join their husbands at the siege. On their way back, the axle of their carriage was broken in an accident on June 13 near Providence, and their journey was delayed. They arrived back in Roxbury just in time to see the bloody aftermath of the Battle of Bunker Hill. The shock of seeing this, and the realization of the danger her family was in, caused Faith to start having bouts of serious depression. Despite the best efforts of the family she continued to deteriorate and hanged herself on November 24, 1775.

In July 1775, the Connecticut Assembly ordered the creation of the 8th Regiment and gave command to Colonel Huntington. The men were recruited mainly in New London, Hartford, and Windham Counties and included much of Huntington's 20th regiment. The regiment was stationed on the Long Island Sound until September 14 when, on requisition from Washington, it was ordered to the Boston Camps and took its post at Roxbury in Gen. Spencer's Brigade. The 8th remained active until expiration of the terms of service in December 1775.

As part of the January 1, 1776 organization of the Continental Army, Huntington's 8th Connecticut Regiment became the 17th Continental Regiment. Originally planned to have a strength of 728 officers and men, by the end of January the 17th only had about 400 men, as did most of the other regiments. Indeed, maintaining soldiers past their terms of service was a problem for the Continental Army. In a letter to Jabez Huntington, Colonel Huntington said, "we shall not with all our Rhetoric be able to retain many," On March 4, Huntington's regiment was one of those ordered to take and hold Dorchester Heights, the action that ended the siege by forcing the British to evacuate Boston. The day following the end of the siege, Washington began moving the army to New York. As they passed through Norwich on April 8, Colonel Huntington, Governor Trumbull (Faith's father), and General Washington had dinner at the Huntington home. By April 22, Huntington and most of his unit were in position in New York.

Huntington's regiment began fortifying New York City in anticipation of a British attack and it was here they heard of the Declaration of Independence. The 17th had lost men during the Boston siege due to illness and desertion, which continued in New York. Around August 19, Colonel Huntington became seriously ill, possibly with malaria, and was unable to perform his duties, so his second in command Lt. Col. Joel Clark replaced him. On August 24, the regiment was ordered to the Brooklyn front. Because it was so understrength, it was placed under the command of Gen. Parsons and combined with Col. Atlee's Pennsylvania regiment. When the Battle of Long Island was fought on the 27th, most of Huntington's regiment was surrounded and taken as prisoners, including Lt. Col. Clark, who died in captivity. The few men left of Huntington's regiment joined the main army under the command of Gen. Heath and evacuated with them as they fled New York. The 17th was never rebuilt and it ceased to exist when enlistments expired at the end of December.

When the Continental Army was reorganized as the "Continental Line" at the beginning of 1777, Colonel Huntington was placed in command of the 1st Regiment. In early April, the Connecticut regiments were ordered to Peekskill to join the NY and New England troops for the season. As they were getting organized, the enemy launched the Battle of Ridgefield (also known as the Battle of Danbury) in which Huntington's regiment fought and after that they moved to Peekskill. On May 12, Huntington was promoted to Brigadier general and placed in command of a brigade consisting of three Connecticut regiments. The Connecticut "line" stayed in Peekskill except for a few excursions. Huntington was ordered to move in support of Washington in the Battle of Brandywine, but the battle was over before they arrived. The Connecticut units were not used in the Saratoga campaign, so Washington moved them from Peekskill to join him at Valley Forge and they spent the bitter winter there.

In the spring of 1778, the troops were trained by Gen. Steuben before moving out in June to follow the British out of Philadelphia. General Huntington's brigade was part of the main line after Gen. Lee's retreat at the Battle of Monmouth. Starting on the 4th of July in New Brunswick, he was a member of the court-martial of Gen. Lee. At the winter camp in White Plains Gen. Huntington was placed in command of the four regiments in the 2nd Brigade of the Connecticut Division. Washington then moved Huntington's Brigade to Redding for the remainder of the winter.

Huntington's Brigade was ordered out of Redding in May 1779 and sent to the Hudson River. In June it was encamped in the highlands on the east side of the river opposite West Point and here they continued construction of three redoubts that had previously been started. In response to Tryon's Raid the entire Connecticut division was ordered to move as quickly as possible in response, but it arrived after Tryon had sailed and they missed the opportunity to defend their own state. About 21 October, the enemy destroyed and abandoned their posts at Stony and Verplanck's Points, so the Connecticut Line was ordered to those locations, where they began repairs. With winter again approaching, the Connecticut units were ordered in mid-November to Morristown to camp with the main army.

In early 1780, Huntington's brigade was under the command of Gen. St. Clair because Huntington was on furlough but on 3 April he was reinstated. Since the three-year enlistments of men from 1777 were expiring, General Huntington had to focus on recruiting to maintain the strength of the brigade. It was at this time that the levies (draft) were instated to fill the ranks. On June 7, the two Connecticut brigades (the other being under Gen. Parsons) were placed under the command of Gen. Lafayette and about June 20 left camp to return to the area around West Point. Although the army moved several times in response to enemy activity, little of significance happened that summer. The Connecticut troops were stationed about 40 miles south of West Point on the 26th of September. It was then they heard of the treason of Benedict Arnold and some of the units were positioned around West Point to protect it against a possible enemy attack. After the capture of John André, General Huntington was appointed one of the members of the board at his trial. The army stayed in this area over the coming winter. In October the Continental Congress ordered a reorganization of the army and the eight previous Connecticut regiments were combined into five new ones and Huntington was placed in command of the 1st, 3rd, and 5th regiments.

The Connecticut Line left their winter quarters on June 21, 1781 bound for Peekskill. It was at this camp that the French army soldiers joined the patriots. In August, Gen. Washington took most of the army south, leaving the Connecticut, New Hampshire, and Massachusetts units behind to guard the highlands. Washington's movement ended at the Siege of Yorktown that effectively ended the war.

On June 24, 1783, Washington wrote that the army was "reduced to a competent garrison for West Point; Patterson, Huntington, and Greaton being the only brigadiers now left with it, besides the adjutant general." That same month Jedediah Huntington received the brevet rank of major general. The Treaty of Paris was signed on September 3, 1783, formally ending the war.

== Later life ==
After the Revolution, he was one of the first members of the board of foreign missions, and a zealous supporter of charitable institutions. He was an original member of the Society of the Cincinnati. In 1788, he was appointed high sheriff of New London and later the same year the following announcement appeared in the papers: "Major General Huntington Esq. Vice President of the order of Cincinnati, High Sheriff for the county of New London, Judge of Probate for the district of Norwich, first Alderman of the city of Norwich, one of the representatives of the town in the State Legislature, and one of the State Electors, is now appointed by the General Assembly Treasurer for the State of Connecticut."

Later in 1789, he relinquished most of these duties when President Washington appointed him to be the customs house collector for the coastal area from the Connecticut River to Rhode Island. He held this post, living in New London, until his death in 1818, when he was succeeded by Brigadier General Thomas Humphrey Cushing.

Initially buried in New London, his remains were disinterred and laid to rest in the family tomb in Norwich as he requested in his will.

== Family ==
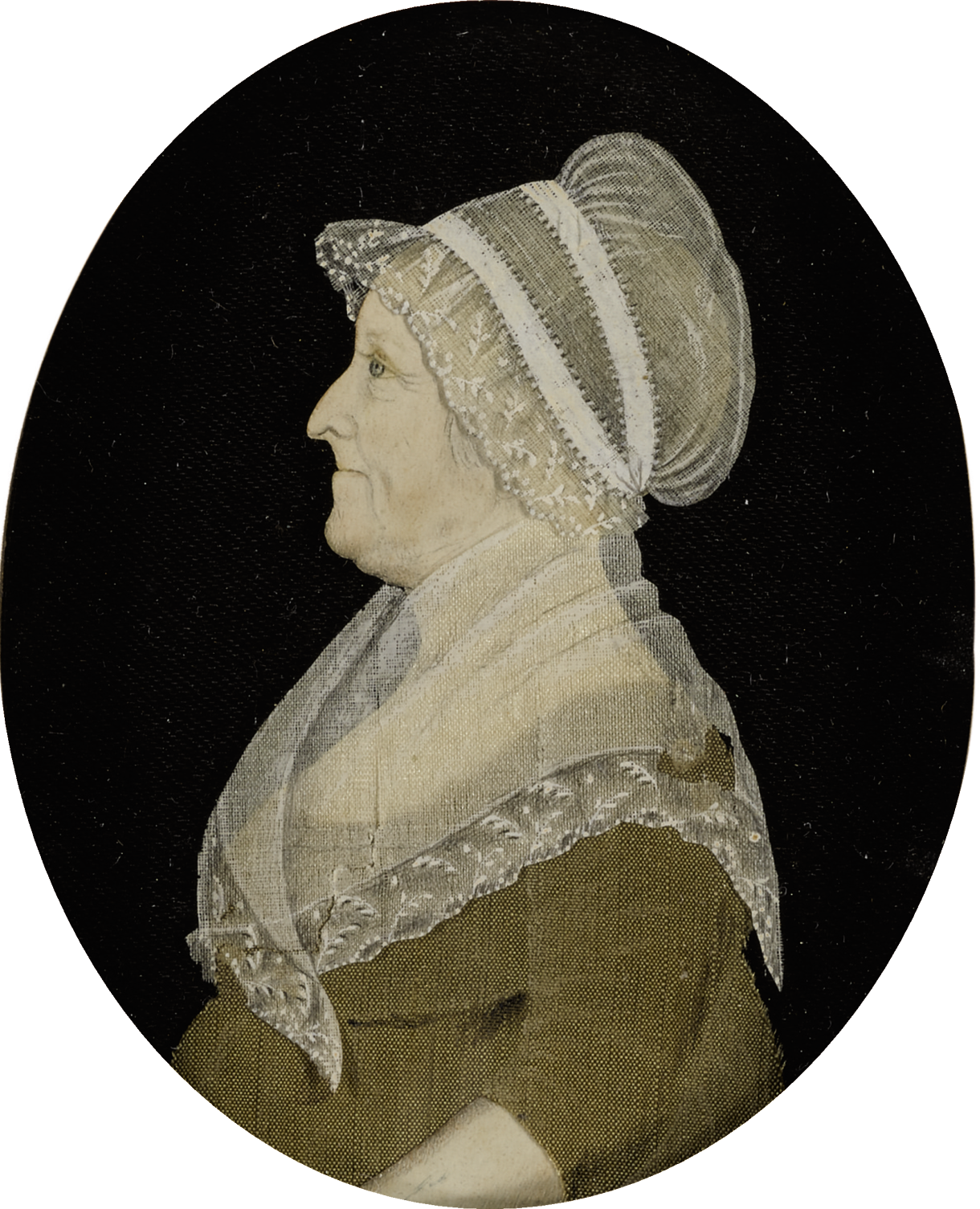
Anne Moore Huntington

In addition to his father being a major general, Huntington's brother Andrew and half-brothers Joshua, Ebenezer and Zachariah were officers during the war.

Huntington's first wife was Faith Trumbull, daughter of Connecticut Governor Jonathan Trumbull. Huntington and Faith had a son Jabez (17 Sep 1767 - 16 Aug 1848), before she hanged herself in Dedham (see his service at Boston in 1775). Jabez spent the rest of the war with his grandparents. His brother-in-law John Trumbull painted the original of the picture of Huntington shown on this page.

Huntington met Anne Moore in Peekskill, probably when his unit was based there in 1777. Her father was a Loyalist and a member of the High Church while Huntington was a Patriot and a Puritan, but they were married with her father's blessing.

Huntington and Anne Moore Huntington had seven children:

1. Elizabeth Moore, b. 20 Jan 1779;
2. Ann Channing, b. 9 Oct 1780;
3. Faith Trumbull, b. 7 Oct 1782, married her distant cousin Benjamin Huntington; they were the parents of Daniel Huntington and Jedediah Vincent Huntington
4. Harriet Smith, b. 24 Jul 1784;
5. Joshua, b. 31 Jan 1786;
6. Daniel, b. 17 Oct 1788
7. Thomas, b. 4 Dec 1793; Physician and Baptist evangelist.

== Legacy ==
The Gen. Jedidiah Huntington House, in Norwichtown, survives and was listed on the U.S. National Register of Historic Places in 1970. He entertained many distinguished officers in his house, among whom were Lafayette, Steuben, and Pulaski. When Lauzun's Legion was stationed at Lebanon during the winter of 1780-1781, he invited that commander and his officers to a banquet.

Political offices
Preceded by John Lawrence	Connecticut State Treasurer; 1789–1790	Succeeded by Peter Colt
