= Leffingwell Inn =

- U.S. National Register of Historic Places
- U.S. Historic district – Contributing property
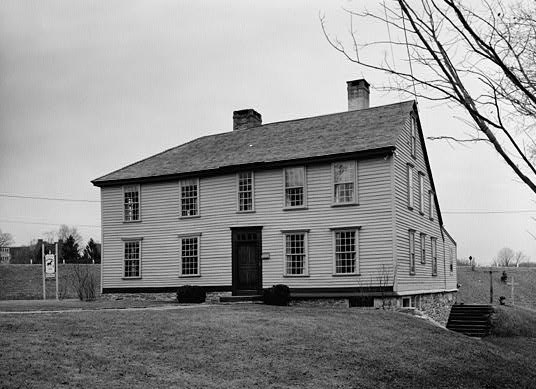
- Leffingwell Inn in 1961

- Location within Connecticut Location within the United States
- Location: 348 Washington Street, Norwich, Connecticut
- Coordinates: 41°32′42″N 72°5′19″W
- Area: 2 acres (0.81 ha)
- Built: 1675
- Architectural style: Colonial, Saltbox
- Part of: Norwichtown Historic District (ID730019751)
- NRHP reference No.: 70000728

Significant dates
- Added to NRHP: December 29, 1970
- Designated CP: January 17, 1973

The Leffingwell Inn (now known as Leffingwell House Museum) is a historic inn at 348 Washington Street in the Norwichtown section of Norwich, Connecticut. It is one of Connecticut's oldest buildings, built around 1675, and was an important meeting place during the American Revolutionary War. The building was listed on the National Register of Historic Places in 1970.

== Description and history ==
The Leffingwell Inn is located just south of the junction of Town and Washington Streets, at the southern end of the Norwichtown area. It is a 2 1/2-story wood-frame structure, built in stages in the 17th and 18th centuries. The northeastern corner dates to 1675 and was built by Stephen Backus. The Inn was founded by Thomas Leffingwell 2nd, the son of Norwich co-founder Thomas Leffingwell. It was altered and expanded several times over the next century until it reached its present configuration. It is a roughly square structure with two main facades and long sloping roof lines along the other two facades, as if two saltbox houses had been joined at a corner. It has many features dating primarily to the 18th century, including casement windows, wooden paneling, and several kitchen hearths.

Most of the architectural features of the house are the handiwork of Benajah and Christopher Leffingwell, who made the most significant alterations and additions in the 18th century. Christopher operated the inn and also established Norwich's first paper mill and a stocking factory. The inn is historically important as a meeting point during the American Revolutionary War. It is now a museum property owned by a local historical society.

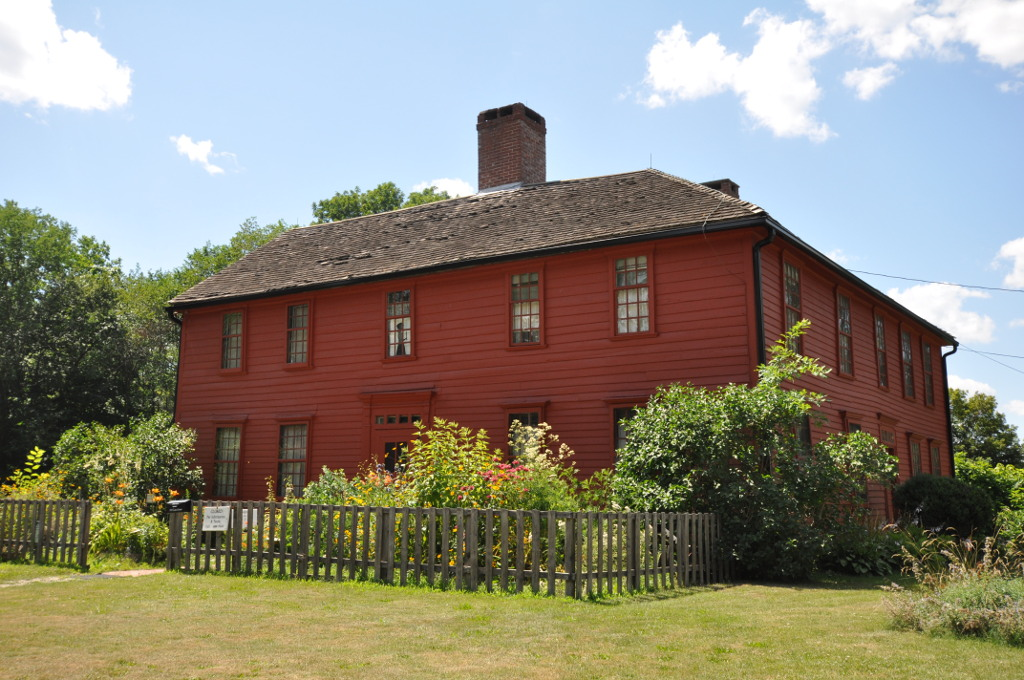
The inn in 2016

== See also ==
- National Register of Historic Places listings in New London County, Connecticut
- List of Washington's Headquarters during the Revolutionary War
- List of the oldest buildings in Connecticut
