= Dr. Daniel Lathrop School =

- U.S. National Register of Historic Places
- U.S. Historic district – Contributing property
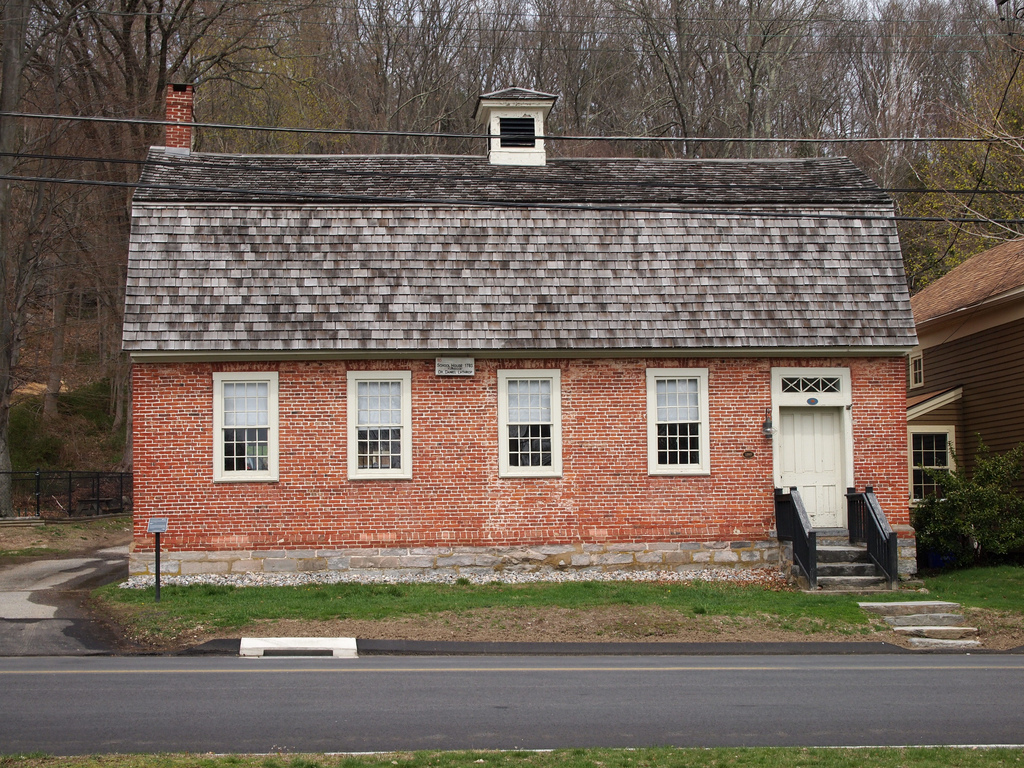

- Location within Connecticut Location within the United States
- Location: 69 East Town Street, Norwich, Connecticut
- Coordinates: 41°33′00″N 72°05′41″W
- Area: 0.5 acres (0.20 ha)
- Built: 1782
- Part of: Norwichtown Historic District (ID730019751)
- NRHP reference No.: 70000726

Significant dates
- Added to NRHP: December 29, 1970
- Designated CP: January 17, 1973

The Dr. Daniel Lathrop School is a historic school building at 69 East Town Street in the Norwichtown section of Norwich, Connecticut, United States. It is a single-story brick structure with a gambrel roof, located facing the village green next to the Joseph Carpenter Silversmith Shop, another historic building. Built in 1782, it is one of the oldest surviving brick school buildings in the state. The building was listed on the National Register of Historic Places on December 29, 1970. It now serves as a visitors center for the local historical society.

== Description and history ==
The Dr. Daniel Lathrop School is located on the northside East Town Street, facing the triangular Norwichtown green, next to the Joseph Carpenter Silversmith Shop. It is a single-story brick building, covered with a wooden shingled gambrel roof. The main facade is five bays wide, with the entrance in the rightmost bay, topped by a transom window. The roof is capped by a small square cupola with a flared roof. Windows are 12-over-12 sash windows, and there is a possibly original plank door on the back side of the building.

Dr. Daniel Lathrop was a physician in the town of Norwich in the mid-18th century. He bequeathed £500 for the establishment of a grammar school in Norwichtown, which resulted in the construction of this building in 1782. In addition to serving as a school, the building has housed a branch library, and been used by the city as a polling place. It is one of the oldest school buildings in the state, and makes a contrast with the adjacent silversmith shop, built to the same plan but out of wood. It is now used by the Norwich Historical Society as a visitors center.

== See also ==
- National Register of Historic Places listings in New London County, Connecticut
