= Col. Joshua Huntington House =

Historic house in Connecticut, United States

- U.S. National Register of Historic Places
- U.S. Historic district – Contributing property
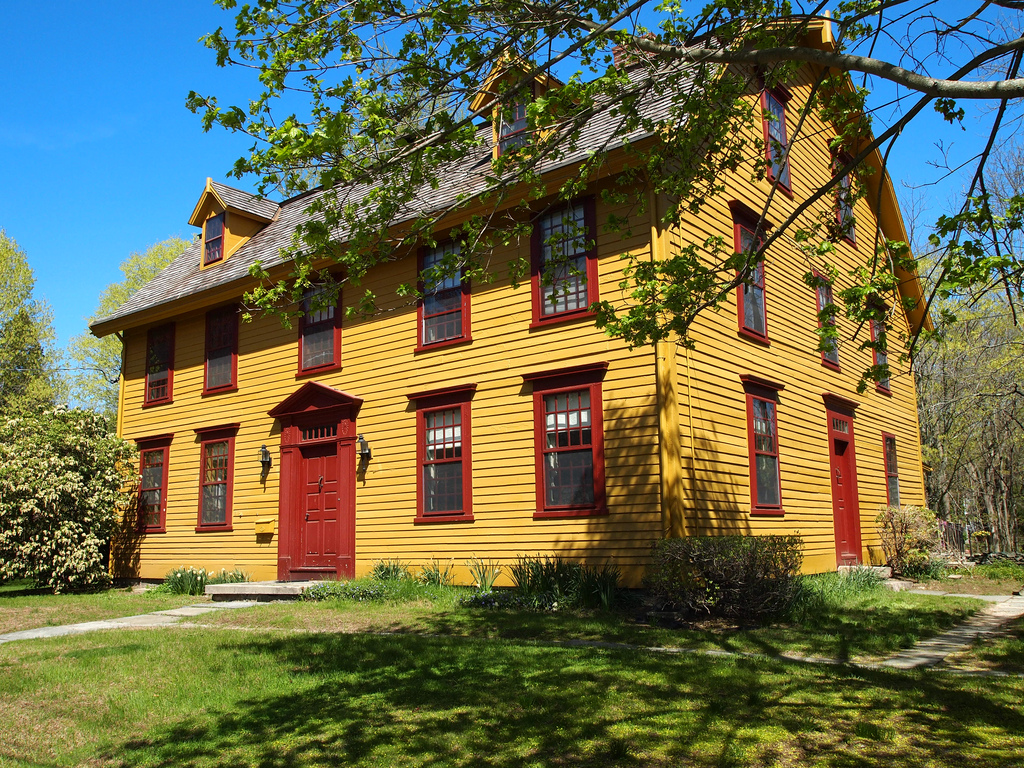

- Location within Connecticut Location within the United States
- Location: 11 Huntington Lane, Norwich, Connecticut
- Coordinates: 41°33′4″N 72°5′27″W
- Area: 2 acres (0.81 ha)
- Built: 1771
- Part of: Norwichtown Historic District (ID730019751)
- NRHP reference No.: 72001343

Significant dates
- Added to NRHP: February 23, 1972
- Designated CP: January 17, 1973

The Col. Joshua Huntington House is a historic house at 11 Huntington Lane in Norwich, Connecticut. Built in 1771, it is a well-preserved example of Georgian architecture in the city's Norwichtown area. It was built for Joshua Huntington, scion of a prominent family and a local military leader during the American Revolutionary War. The house was listed on the National Register of Historic Places on February 23, 1972.

== Description and history ==
The Colonel Joshua Huntington House is located in Norwichtown, one of the early settlement areas of Norwich, on the east side of Huntington Lane. It is a 2 1/2-story wood-frame structure, five bays wide, with a gambrel roof, twin brick chimneys, and clapboard siding. Its main entrance is flanked by pilasters and topped by a transom window and gabled pediment. Windows on the ground floor are topped by a corniced lintels, while those on the upper floor butt against the eave. There are two gabled dormers projecting from the front face of the roof, which are probably a 19th-century addition.

The house was built in 1771 by Joshua Huntington, the son of Jabez Huntington, one of Norwich's leading businessmen. The younger Huntington served in the Continental Army during the American Revolutionary War, participating the Siege of Boston and parts of the [1776 New York and New Jersey campaign. He thereafter served in the Connecticut militia, rising to the rank of colonel in that organization. He was also active politically, serving as sheriff, and as a presidential elector. The house remained in the Huntington family until 1823.

== See also ==
- National Register of Historic Places listings in New London County, Connecticut
