= East District School =

- U.S. National Register of Historic Places
- U.S. Historic district – Contributing property
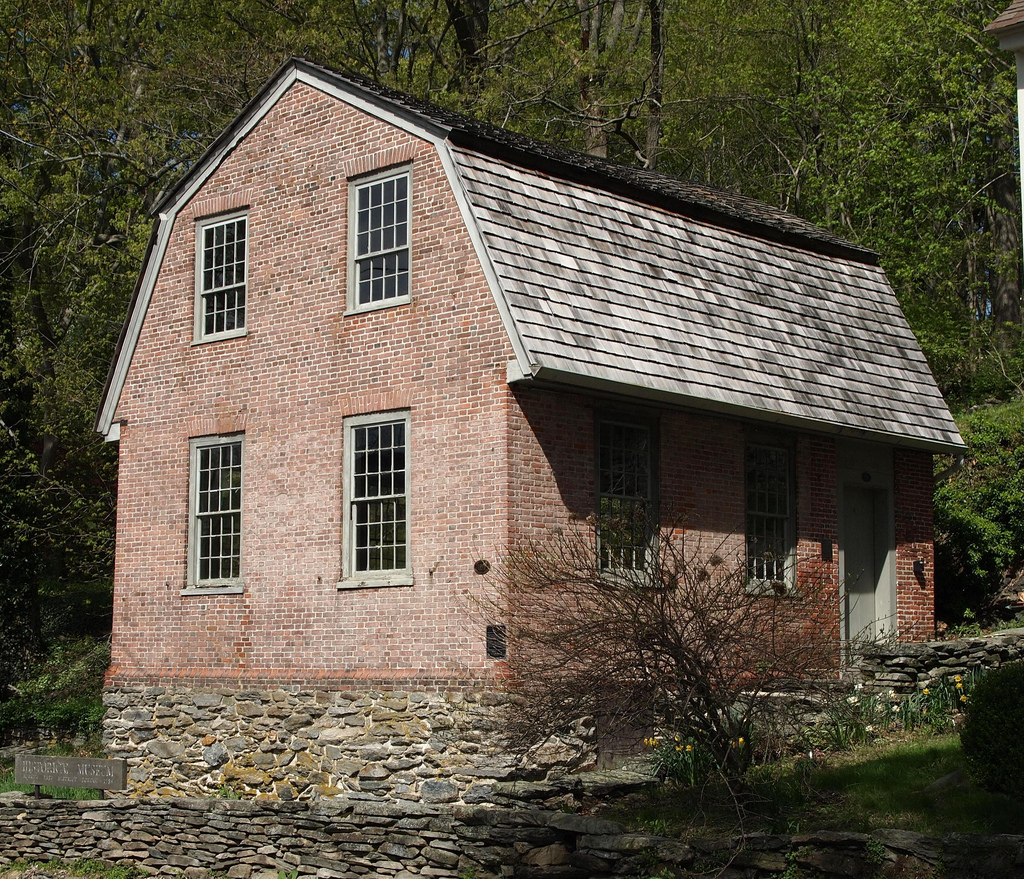

- Location within Connecticut Location within the United States
- Location: 365 Washington Street, Norwich, Connecticut
- Coordinates: 41°32′46″N 72°05′18″W
- Area: 0.5 acres (0.20 ha)
- Built: 1798
- Part of: Norwichtown Historic District (ID730019751)
- NRHP reference No.: 70000717

Significant dates
- Added to NRHP: October 28, 1970
- Designated CP: January 17, 1973

The East District School is a historic school building at 365 Washington Street in Norwich, Connecticut, built in 1798. It is significant as a rare and well-preserved 18th-century schoolhouse, and as the location of an evening school for adults established by Consider Sterry, author of an early guide to practical navigation. The school was listed on the National Register of Historic Places in 1970, and is a contributing property to the Norwichtown Historic District.

== Description and history ==
The East District School is located in the geographically central Norwichtown area of Norwich, on the east side of Washington Street, north of its junction with Butts Lane. It is a small, one-story brick building with a gambrel roof covered in wooden shingles, oriented so that a gable end faces the street. The facade is two bays wide, with sash windows in each bay on both the first floor and the attic level. The building's fieldstone foundation is partially exposed on this side due to the slope of the terrain. The main facade faces south and is three bays wide, with the entrance in the rightmost bay and windows in the other two.

The building dates no later than 1798, when Consider Steery established an evening school for adults that met there. Sterry was entirely self-taught, yet he taught writing and bookkeeping and instructed sailors in the methods of determining latitude and longitude at sea. He also published treatises on a variety of subjects, including a 300-page book on navigation. The school building was derelict at the time of its National Register listing in 1970, but it has since been restored by the local historical society.

== See also ==
- National Register of Historic Places listings in New London County, Connecticut
