= Gov. Samuel Huntington House =

Historic house in Connecticut, United States

- U.S. National Register of Historic Places
- U.S. Historic district – Contributing property
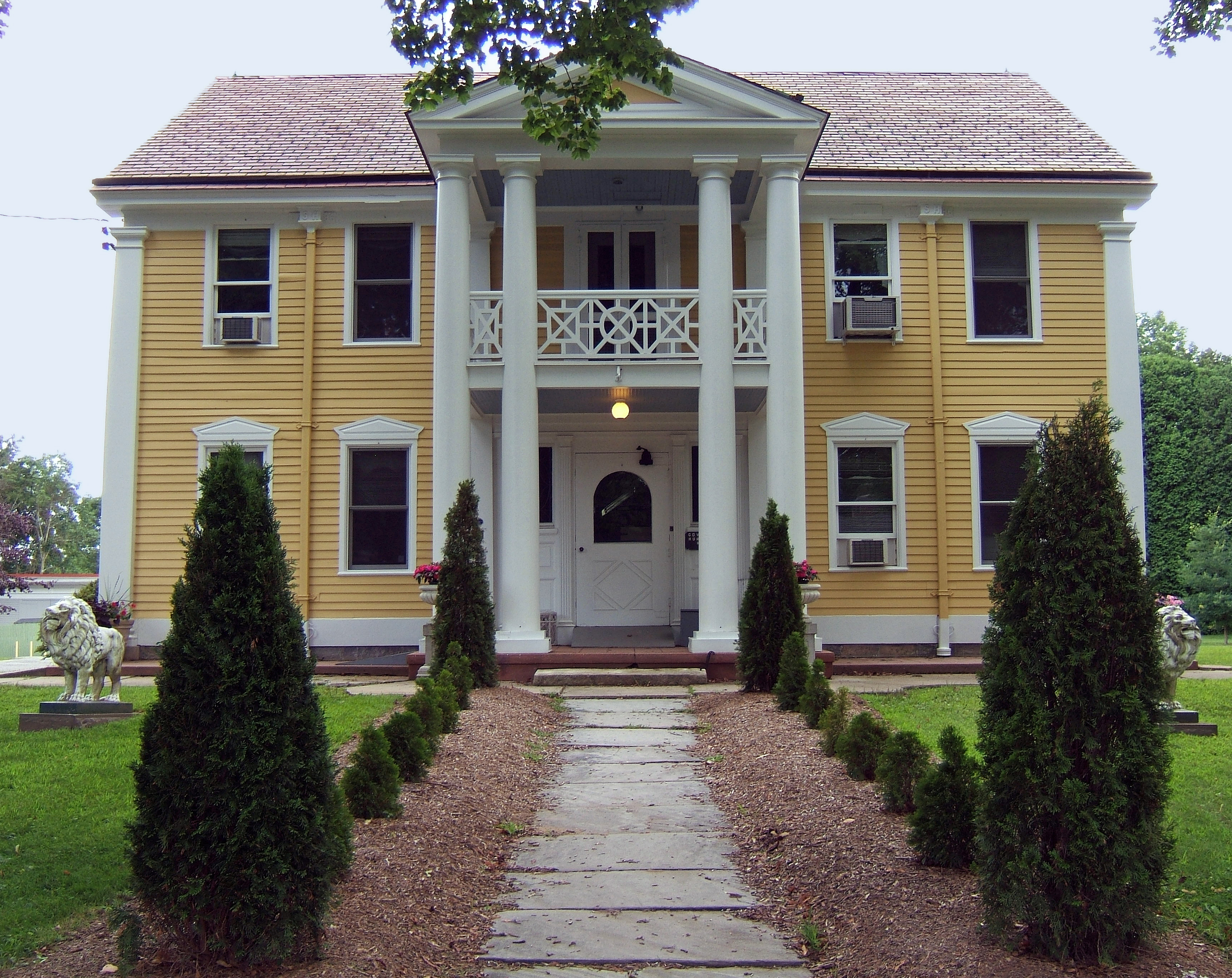
- Gov. Samuel Huntington House

- Location within Connecticut Location within the United States
- Location: 34 East Town Street, Norwich, Connecticut
- Coordinates: 41°33′1″N 72°5′31″W
- Area: 2 acres (0.81 ha)
- Built: 1783
- Architectural style: Georgian
- Part of: Norwichtown Historic District (ID73001951)
- NRHP reference No.: 70000725

Significant dates
- Added to NRHP: October 6, 1970
- Designated CP: January 17, 1973

The Gov. Samuel Huntington House is a historic house at 34 East Town Street in Norwich, Connecticut. The house was built in 1783 by Samuel Huntington (1731–96), a signer of the United States Declaration of Independence and a Governor of Connecticut. It was listed on the National Register of Historic Places on October 6, 1970, and is a contributing property to the Norwichtown Historic District.

== Description and history ==
The Governor Samuel Huntington House is located in the Norwichtown neighborhood of Norwich, one of its early settlement areas. It is on the south side of East Town Street, just west of its junction with Huntington Lane. It is a 2 1/2-story wood-frame structure, five bays wide, with a side-gable roof and clapboard siding. Its most prominent feature is a monumental entry portico, rising a full two stories to a gabled pediment, supported by paired columns. The main entry is flanked by sidelight windows and a carved woodwork surround, and there is a latticework porch above. The entry portico and wide entry section are 19th-century alterations, and there have been significant interior alterations, accommodating the building's 20th-century use as an office.

The house was built in 1783 for Samuel Huntington, one of Norwich's leading citizens. Born in Scotland, Connecticut, he came to Norwich in 1763, where he soon represented the town in the colonial legislature. He served on Connecticut's committee of safety, and in the Continental Congress, where he signed the United States Declaration of Independence and served for one year as its president. He became the state's third governor in 1786, a position he held until his death ten years later.

== See also ==
- National Register of Historic Places listings in New London County, Connecticut
