= Joseph Carpenter Silversmith Shop =

- U.S. National Register of Historic Places
- U.S. Historic district – Contributing property
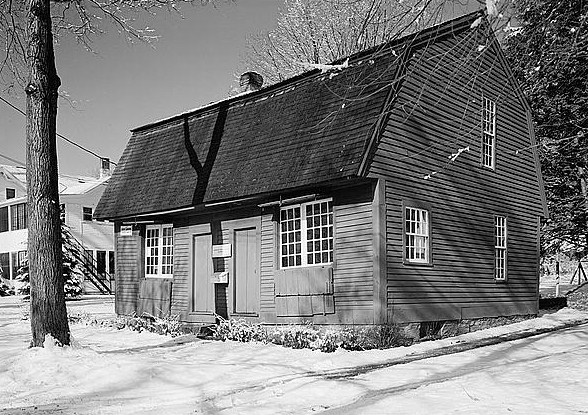
- Joseph Carpenter Silversmith Shop in 1961

- Location within Connecticut Location within the United States
- Location: 71 East Town Street, Norwich, Connecticut
- Coordinates: 41°32′59″N 72°5′43″W
- Area: 0.5 acres (0.20 ha)
- Built: 1772
- Part of: Norwichtown Historic District (ID730019751)
- NRHP reference No.: 70000722

Significant dates
- Added to NRHP: October 6, 1970
- Designated CP: January 17, 1973

The Joseph Carpenter Silversmith Shop is a historic building that was built between 1772 and 1774 on the green in the Norwichtown section of Norwich, Connecticut. It is a 30 feet (9.1 m) by 24 feet (7.3 m) 1 1/2-story clapboarded building with a gambrel roof. The interior has a single brick chimney that was used for the forge. The house has been adapted for modern use with modern doors, electric lighting and heat, and a disappearing overhead stairway that leads to the attic. Joseph Carpenter (1747–1804) was a successful silversmith, clockmaker, and pewterer, and he shared the building with his brother who was a merchant. The shop was added to the National Register of Historic Places on October 6, 1970, and was listed as a contributory property for the Norwichtown Historic District on January 17, 1973.

== Original occupants ==
Joseph Carpenter was born in 1747 to Joseph and Elizabeth Carpenter (née Lathrop). He was a successful silversmith in Norwich, Connecticut. His shop was constructed between 1772 and 1774, and he shared it with his brother Gardner Carpenter, who operated a mercantile business. In 1775, Joseph Carpenter married Eunice Fitch, and they had six children. He died in 1804. Carpenter was noted to be one of the "most successful of the Norwich silversmiths, clockmakers, and pewterers".

== Design ==
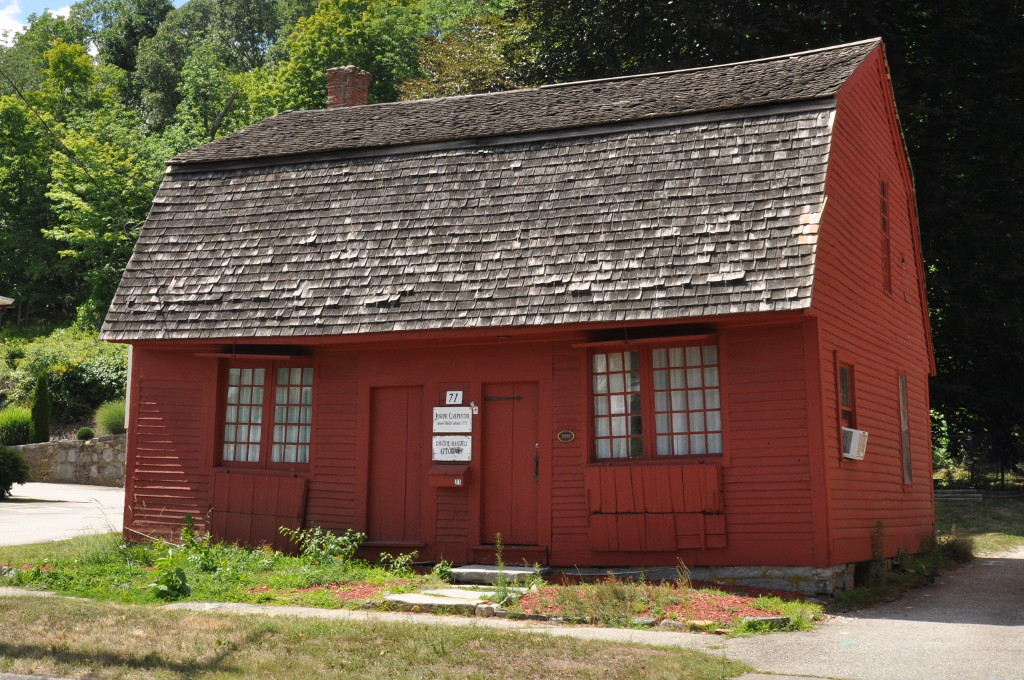
The shop in 2016

Facing southeast on the Norwichtown green, the Joseph Carpenter Silversmith Shop is a 30 feet (9.1 m) by 24 feet (7.3 m) 1 1/2-story clapboarded building with a gambrel roof. Constructed between 1772 and 1774, the building was built on a stone foundation and has a stone stoop leading to the front entrance. The gambrel roof is framed without a ridge pole. It overhangs the front and back facades by 2 feet (0.61 m), but does not project the sides. At the time of the National Historic Register of Places nomination, the roof used wooden shingles. The interior has a single brick chimney that was used for the forge. The main floor was originally open, with only a single supporting post in the center, but this was later partitioned into several rooms. Modern additions to the shop include modern doors, electric lighting and heat, and a disappearing overhead stairway that leads to the attic. The shop's cellar was not described in the survey. In 1915, the house passed out of the Carpenter family, and it was restored by Norman Isham in 1916. In 1956, the building came into the ownership of the "Society of the Founders of Norwich, Connecticut, Inc.". According to the 1966 edition of Fodor's Modern Guides, the Joseph Carpenter Silversmith Shop was "still furnished as it was when Mr. Carpenter plied his trade." The National Historic Register of Places noted that the partitioning was "recent" at the time of its 1970 nomination. In 1997, a $5000 grant was used to replace the roof.

== Importance ==
The Joseph Carpenter Silversmith Shop is an example of a small frame silversmith's shop, and is believed to be the only surviving example in New England. It was added to the National Register of Historic Places on October 6, 1970, and was listed as a contributory property for the Norwichtown Historic District on January 17, 1973.

The shop was the subject of a preservation effort as early as 1917. It was photographed by the Historic American Buildings Survey and was featured as part of a historic house tour in 1993's "Reflections on the Past."

== See also ==
- National Register of Historic Places listings in New London County, Connecticut
- Dr. Daniel Lathrop School, next door
- Carpenter House (Norwich, Connecticut) - The house of Joseph Carpenter's brother, Gardner Carpenter.
