= Samuel Huntington (Connecticut politician) =

American Founding Father and politician (1731–1796)

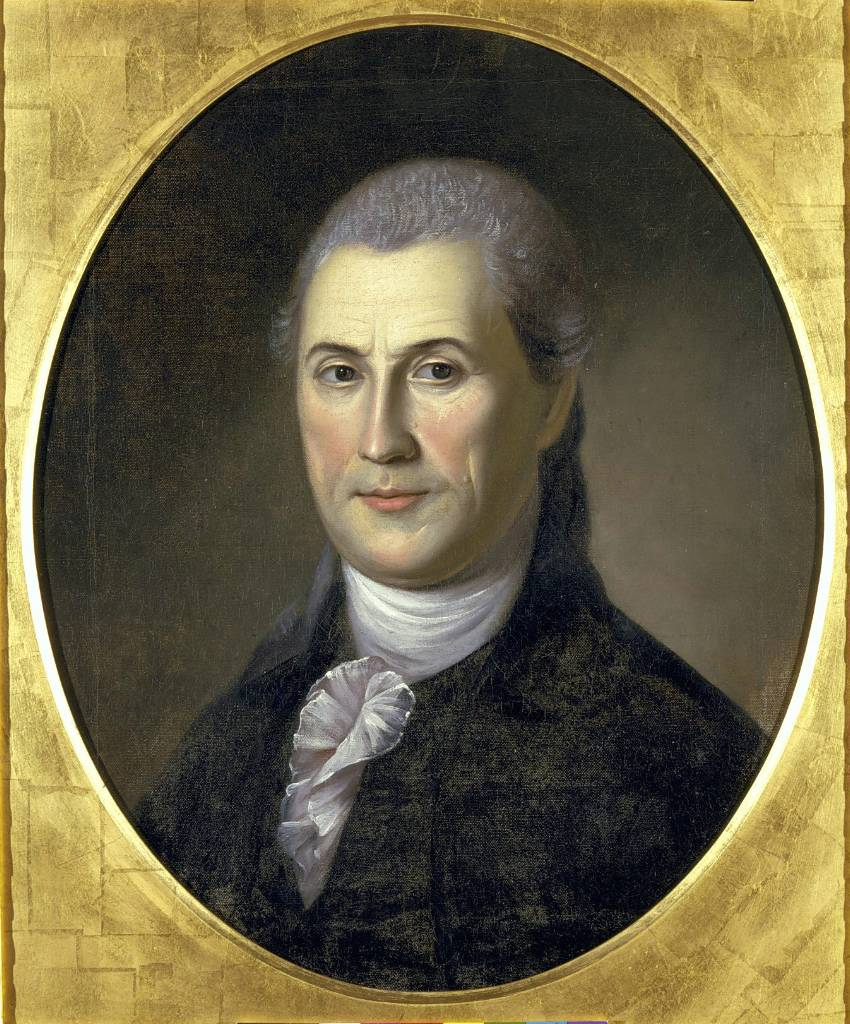
- Portrait by Charles Willson Peale, c. 1783

18th Governor of Connecticut
- In office May 11, 1786 – January 5, 1796
- Lieutenant: Oliver Wolcott
- Preceded by: Matthew Griswold
- Succeeded by: Oliver Wolcott

22nd Lieutenant Governor of Connecticut
- In office 1784–1786
- Governor: Matthew Griswold
- Preceded by: Matthew Griswold
- Succeeded by: Oliver Wolcott

1st President of the Confederation Congress
- In office September 28, 1779 – July 10, 1781
- Preceded by: John Jay (as 6th President of the Continental Congress)
- Succeeded by: Thomas McKean

Personal details
- Born: July 16, 1731 Windham, Connecticut, British America (now Scotland, Connecticut)
- Died: January 5, 1796 (aged 64) Norwich, Connecticut, U.S.
- Resting place: Old Norwichtown Cemetery, Norwich
- Party: Federalist
- Spouse: Martha Devotion

Samuel Huntington (July 16, 1731 – January 5, 1796) was a Founding Father of the United States and a lawyer, jurist, statesman, and Patriot in the American Revolution from Connecticut. As a delegate to the Continental Congress, he signed the Declaration of Independence and the Articles of Confederation. He also served as President of the Continental Congress from 1779 to 1781, President of the United States in Congress Assembled in 1781, chief justice of the Connecticut Supreme Court from 1784 to 1785, and the 18th governor of Connecticut from 1786 until his death in 1796.

== Early life and education ==
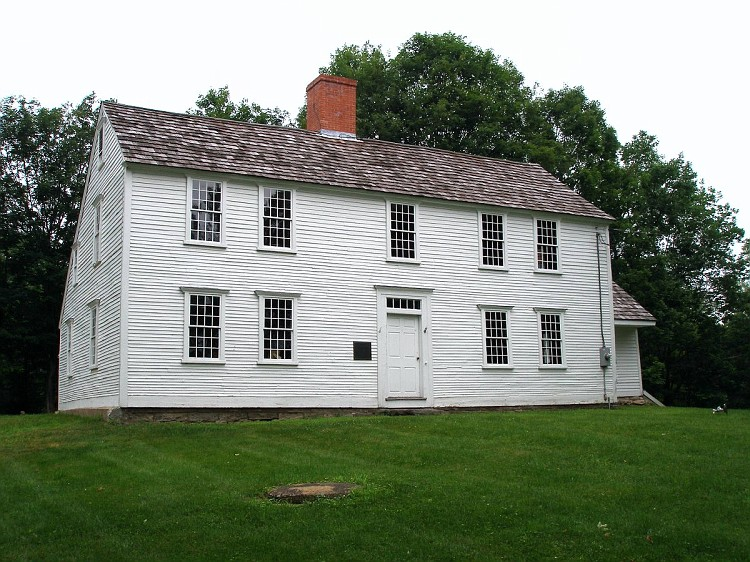
The house where Huntington was born in Scotland, Connecticut Colony

Huntington's personal coat of arms

Huntington was born to Nathaniel and Mehetabel Huntington on July 16, 1731, in Windham, Connecticut Colony in present-day Scotland, Connecticut, which broke off from Windham in 1857. His house is currently accessible off Route 14. He was the fourth of ten children and the oldest son. He had a limited education in the common schools, then was self-educated. When he was 16, he was apprenticed to a cooper but also continued to help his father on the family farm. His education largely was a product of books he read from the library of Rev. Ebenezer Devotion and books borrowed from local lawyers.

In 1754, Huntington was admitted to the bar, and moved to Norwich, Connecticut, to begin practicing law.

== Career ==
=== Connecticut Assembly ===
After brief service as a selectman, Huntington began his political career in earnest in 1764 when Norwich sent him as one of their representatives to the lower house of the Connecticut Assembly, where he served until 1774. In 1775, he was elected to the upper house, the Governor's Council, where he served until 1784. In addition to serving in the legislature, he was appointed king's attorney for Connecticut in 1768 and in 1773 was appointed to the colony's supreme court, then known as the Supreme Court of Errors. He was chief justice of the Supreme Court from 1784 until 1787.

=== American Revolution ===
Huntington was an outspoken critic of the Coercive Acts of the British Parliament. In October 1775, the assembly elected him to be one of their delegates to the Second Continental Congress in Philadelphia.

In January 1776, he joined Roger Sherman and Oliver Wolcott, which collectively represented the Connecticut Colony's delegation in the Second Continental Congress. He voted for and signed the Declaration of Independence and the Articles of Confederation. He served in the Congress in the years 1776, 1778–1781, and 1783. He suffered from an attack of smallpox while in Congress.

==== President of the Continental Congress ====
While not known for extensive learning or brilliant speech, Huntington's steady hard work and unfailing calm manner earned him the respect of his fellow delegates. As a result, when John Jay left to become minister to the Kingdom of Spain, Huntington was elected to succeed him as President of the Continental Congress on September 28, 1779, which is one reason why he is sometimes considered the first president. The President of Congress was a mostly ceremonial position with no real authority, but the office did require Huntington to handle a good deal of correspondence and sign official documents. He spent his time as president urging the states and their legislatures to support the levies for men, supplies, and money needed to fight the Revolutionary War. The Articles of Confederation were ratified during his term.

Huntington remained as President of Congress until July 9, 1781, when ill health forced him to resign and return to Connecticut. In 1782, Connecticut again named him as a delegate, but his health and judicial duties kept him from accepting. He returned to the Congress as a delegate for the 1783 session to see the success of the revolution embodied in the Treaty of Paris. In that same year, he was elected a member of the American Philosophical Society.

=== Governor of Connecticut ===
In 1785, Huntington built his mansion house just off the green in Norwichtown, Connecticut at what is now 34 East Town Street Gov. Samuel Huntington House and the current headquarters of United and Community Family Services, Inc. In 1785, he was elected as lieutenant governor of Connecticut, serving with Governor Matthew Griswold. In 1786, he became governor. He remained in charge of the Supreme Court during his tenure as lieutenant governor but vacated that position upon election to governor.

In his first year as governor, in a reprise of his efforts in Congress, he brokered the Treaty of Hartford that resolved western land claims between New York and Massachusetts. In 1787, he lent his support to the Northwest Ordinance that completed the national resolution of these issues. In 1788, he presided over the Connecticut Convention that was called to ratify the United States Constitution. In later years he saw the transition of Connecticut into a U.S. state. He resolved the issue of a permanent state capital at Hartford and oversaw the construction of the state house.

He received two electoral votes from his home state, Connecticut, in the first U.S. presidential election.

He was again a member of the Connecticut Supreme Court of Errors from 1794 until his death.

== Personal life ==
Huntington married Martha Devotion (Rev. Devotion's daughter) in 1761. They remained together until her death in 1794. The couple did not birth any children, but when his brother (Rev. Joseph Huntington) died they adopted their nephew and niece. They raised Samuel Huntington "Jr." and Frances as their own. Samuel Huntington never owned slaves.

== Death ==
While serving as governor of Connecticut, Huntington died of dropsy at his home in Norwich on January 5, 1796. His tomb, which was extensively restored in 2003, is located in the Old Norwichtown Cemetery behind his mansion house. Both Samuel and his wife Martha's remains were disinterred during the course of the project and then reinterred in a formal ceremony on November 23, 2003.

== Legacy ==
Huntington, Connecticut, was named in his honor in 1789 but was later renamed to Shelton when the town incorporated with Shelton to form a city in 1919. He is the namesake of Huntington County, Indiana. Huntington Mills is a small town in northeastern Pennsylvania which also derives its name in honor of Samuel Huntington.

The home that Samuel was born in was built by his father, Nathaniel, around 1732 and still stands. The area is now within the borders of the town of Scotland, Connecticut. In 1994, the home and some grounds were purchased by a local historic trust. The Samuel Huntington Birthplace is a National Historic Landmark.

His nephew and adopted son Samuel H. Huntington moved to the Ohio Country region that he had been instrumental in opening up and later became the third governor of Ohio.

Because Huntington was the president of the Second Continental Congress when the Articles of Confederation were ratified, some unconventional biographers and civic groups inaccurately consider Huntington the first President of the United States.

== See also ==
- Memorial to the 56 Signers of the Declaration of Independence

Party political offices
First	Federalist nominee for Governor of Connecticut; 1786, 1787, 1789, 1790, 1791, 1792, 1793, 1794, 1795	Succeeded by Oliver Wolcott
Political offices
Preceded by John Jay	President of Congress; September 28, 1779 – July 9, 1781	Succeeded by Thomas McKean
Preceded by Matthew Griswold	Lieutenant Governor of Connecticut; 1784–1786	Succeeded by Oliver Wolcott
Preceded by Matthew Griswold	Governor of Connecticut; 1786–1796	Succeeded by Oliver Wolcott
