= Matthew Griswold (Connecticut politician) =

American judge (1714–1799)

17th Governor of Connecticut
- In office May 13, 1784 – May 11, 1786
- Lieutenant: Samuel Huntington
- Preceded by: Jonathan Trumbull
- Succeeded by: Samuel Huntington

1st Lieutenant Governor of Connecticut
- In office 1776–1784
- Governor: Jonathan Trumbull
- Preceded by: position established
- Succeeded by: Samuel Huntington

21st Deputy Governor of Connecticut Colony
- In office 1769–1776
- Governor: Jonathan Trumbull
- Preceded by: Jonathan Trumbull
- Succeeded by: position abolished

Personal details
- Born: March 25, 1714 Lyme, Connecticut
- Died: April 28, 1799 (aged 85) Lyme, Connecticut
- Party: Federalist
- Spouse: Ursula Wolcott
- Relations: Griswold family

Matthew Griswold (March 25, 1714 – April 28, 1799) was the 17th governor of Connecticut from 1784 to 1786. He also served as the 21st lieutenant governor (and the first since statehood). He was also chief justice of the Superior Court, during the American Revolution (1769–1784).

== Early life ==
Coat of Arms of Matthew Griswold

Matthew Griswold was born in Lyme, Connecticut, the eldest son of John Griswold, politician and landowner, and Hannah (Lee) Griswold. He was the fourth generation of his family to live in Connecticut; the Griswold family had emigrated there from England in 1639. Through his mother, he is connected to the DeWolf family.

The Griswolds were one of the wealthiest and most respected families in Lyme; several Griswolds served in public office in Connecticut over the generations. In his mid-20s, he decided to study law. He was admitted to the New London Bar in 1742 and opened a practice in Lyme. Many of his legal cases involved settling estates and collecting debts. He became a well-liked and respected teacher of the law as well and over the years developed one of the first and finest collections of law books in Connecticut.

He married then Deputy Governor Roger Wolcott's daughter Ursula on November 10, 1743, and had seven children with her. Their son, Roger Griswold, later also became governor of Connecticut. Matthew Griswold was brother-in-law to Oliver Wolcott and Erastus Wolcott.

== Career ==
His reputation as a fair and hard-working lawyer won Griswold the appointment of king's attorney for New London County. The king's attorney represented the interests of England and her colonies in court. That Griswold held this position for over 30 years stands as a testimony to both his ability as a lawyer and his fair-mindedness. Griswold's busy law practice left much of the management of Black Hall to Ursula.

Griswold was elected to the Connecticut General Assembly in 1748, and from 1751 to 1759. He was then elected to the Council of Assistants, serving from 1759 to 1769. Griswold and eight other councilmembers demonstrated opposition to the Stamp Act of 1765 when Governor Thomas Fitch was required to take an oath to support it. Griswold became a member of the Sons of Liberty, who publicly protested the Stamp Act.

In each of the years from 1769 to 1784, he was elected Deputy Governor of Connecticut. In that position, he also served as chief justice of the Superior Court. During this time, he was concerned about education, and was a member of a committee to improved teaching at Yale College. Yale awarded him a Doctor of Laws in 1779 in appreciation.

== American Revolution ==
Griswold was a strong supporter of the colonists' cause during the American Revolution. He served on many committees that oversaw troop movements, military appointments, provisions, and defense; he especially focused on defending American ships and the Connecticut shoreline. According to family legend, Griswold twice evaded British soldiers as they searched for him, an important target, in his own home.

== Governorship and later years ==
After the end of the war, Griswold was chosen to be Governor in 1784 by the General Assembly, after he failed to receive a majority of votes in the regular election. He was re-elected in 1785, but then lost to Samuel Huntington in 1786. In 1788, as delegate from Lyme, he became president of Connecticut's convention to ratify the new United States Constitution. Later in 1788, Ursula Griswold died, and Matthew Griswold retired from public life.

== Death ==
Griswold continued to manage his family estate, Black Hall, until his death on April 28, 1799. He is interred at Duck River Cemetery, Old Lyme, New London County, Connecticut. His brother-in-law was Rev. Jonathan Parsons, father of General Samuel Holden Parsons. His sister Sarah Griswold was the mother of James Hillhouse.

== See also ==
- List of governors of Connecticut
