= Jedediah Vincent Huntington =

American writer

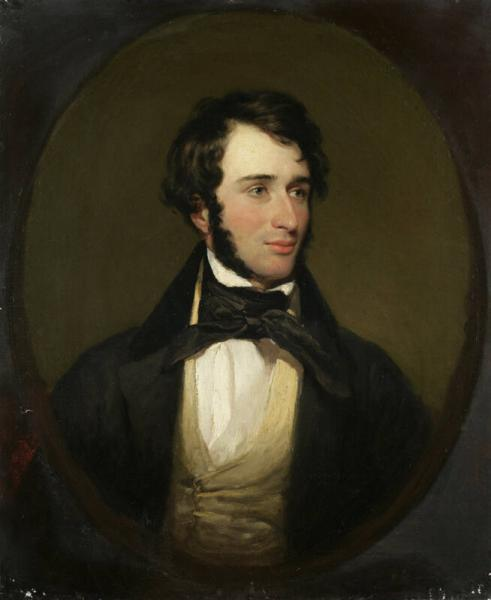
- Oil on canvas portrait (c. 1850)
- Born: January 20, 1815; New York, New York
- Died: March 10, 1862 (aged 47); Pau, France
- Education: New York University; University of Pennsylvania
- Occupations: Novelist, clergyman

Jedediah Vincent Huntington (January 20, 1815 – March 10, 1862) was an American clergyman and novelist. He was born in New York City, the son of Benjamin Huntington Jr. and Faith Trumbull Huntington.

== Biography ==
Huntington was born in New York city, to Faith Huntington, daughter of General Jedediah Huntington; his brother Daniel Huntington was a painter. Two of his uncles were also preachers.

Huntington received his early education at home and at an Episcopalian private school. He entered Yale College and later the University of New York, where he graduated in 1835. He then studied medicine at the University of Pennsylvania, received his degree in 1838, but never practiced his profession. During the three years following he was professor of mental philosophy in St. Paul's Episcopal school near Flushing, Long Island, while also studying for the ministry under William Augustus Muhlenberg. In 1841 he was ordained a minister of the Protestant Episcopal Church, resigned his professorship, and became rector of the Episcopal church at Middlebury, Vermont. Another brother also became a Low Church Episcopal clergyman.

At the end of five years he resigned because of doubts about his religious position, and went to Europe. The next three years were spent mostly in England and in Rome. He left England apparently a firm believer in the Anglican theory of the "Via media". The authority of Rome outside the British possessions he readily accepted. Soon after his arrival in Rome, however, he became convinced that his duty lay in recognizing the exclusive authority of the Roman Catholic Church. On speaking of the subject to his wife, he was agreeably surprised to learn that she was of one mind with him - accordingly, they were both received into the Roman Catholic Church in 1849.

Returning to the USA, he lectured before learned associations in several of the large cities. He became editor of the Metropolitan Magazine, a Catholic periodical published in Baltimore, and later edited The Leader published in St. Louis; each proved a failure. His life was, however, a literary life, and fairly successful. The last few years of his life were spent at Pau, in southern France, where he died of pulmonary tuberculosis at age 47.

== Writings ==
Huntington published four poems in an English magazine in 1837 on the occasion of Queen Victoria’s coronation; his first book of poetry was published six years later. He made several translations from French into English, including Narrative of a Voyage by Gabriel Franchère. He also translated Louis Gaston Adrien de Ségur's Short and Familiar Answers to Objections against Religion.

Huntington is best known as a writer of fiction. His novels were widely read and received considerable notice in the leading journals in America and England. The criticism was often harsh and at times justly deserved, especially in the case of his first novel Lady Alice and its sequel The Forest. One of his best works is Alban, or the History of a Young Puritan, which is practically the history of his own life. His last work was Rosemary, or Life and Death.

== Family ==
He married his cousin, Miss Huntington; she died on 14 Sept 1899.
