= Jabez Huntington (colonist) =

American politician

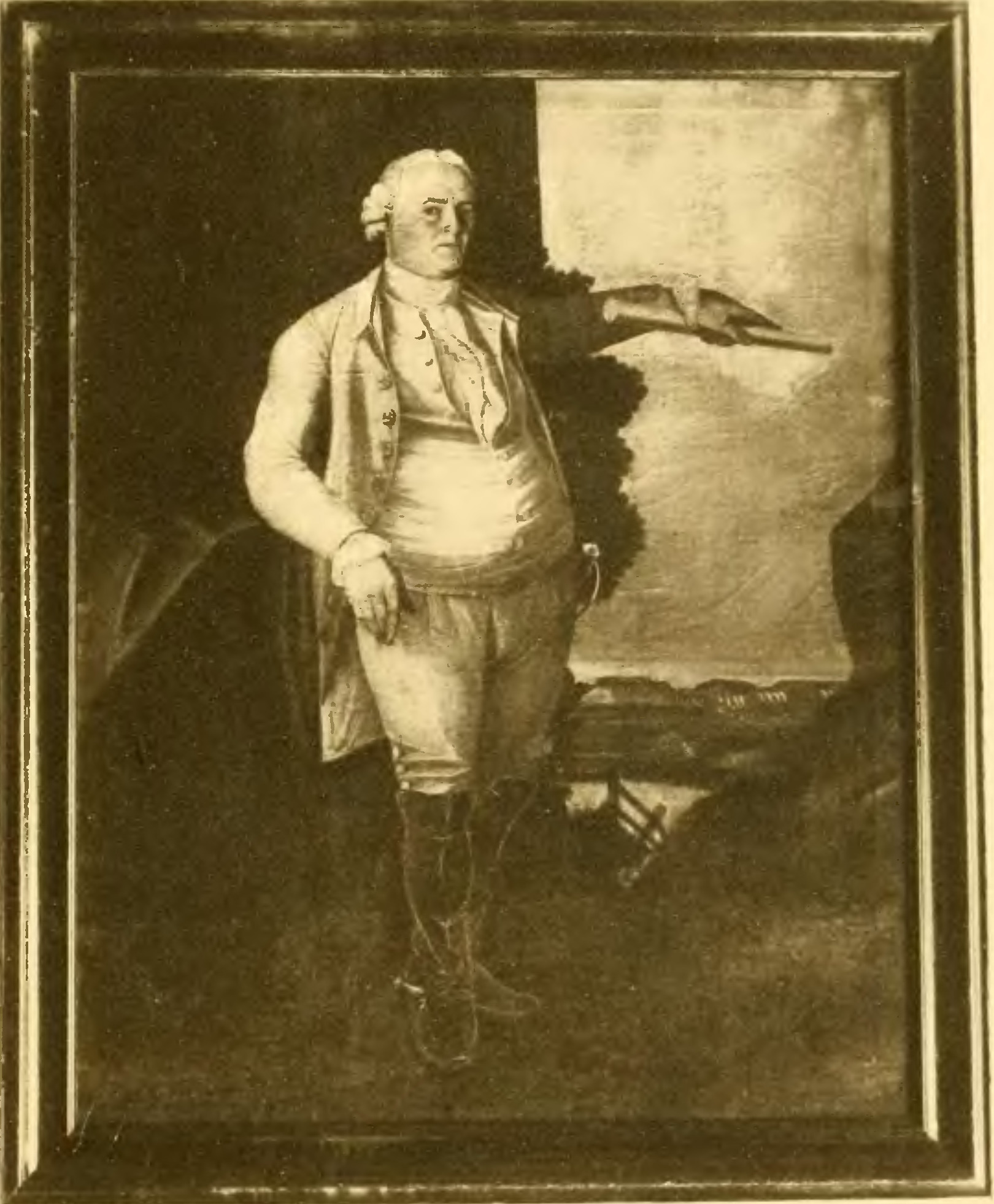
- Portrait by John Trumbull
- Born: August 7, 1719
- Died: October 5, 1786 (aged 67)
- Alma mater: Yale University
- Spouse(s): Elizabeth Backus
- Children: Jedediah Huntington, Andrew Huntington, Joshua Huntington, Ebenezer Huntington
- Parent(s): Joshua Huntington; Hannah Perkins

Jabez Huntington (August 7, 1719 – October 5, 1786) was a merchant and politician from Connecticut Colony.

Jabez Huntington graduated from Yale in 1741, engaged in the West India trade, and amassed a fortune. After 1759, he was frequently a member of the legislature, speaker for several years, and also a member of the council. At the beginning of the American Revolutionary War, he owned a large amount of shipping, and lost heavily by the capture of his vessels. He was among the most active on the committee of safety during the war; and in the September 1776 session of the Connecticut assembly, he and David Wooster were appointed Major Generals. On the death of Wooster in 1777, Jabez was placed in charge of the entire Connecticut militia. His great exertions in the patriot cause and his heavy losses impaired his physical and mental powers, and he was thus compelled to resign his employments in 1779.

== Family ==
Jabez was born on August 7, 1719, in Norwich, Connecticut, to Joshua and Hannah (Perkins) Huntington. He married first Elizabeth (January 20, 1741 – July 1, 1745), the daughter of Samuel and Elizabeth (Tracy) Backus. They had two children, Jedediah in 1743, and Andrew, who was born the month before his mother's death. He married his second wife, Hannah Williams (July 23, 1726 – March 25, 1807) of Pomfret, Connecticut, on July 10, 1746. They had six children: Joshua, Hannah (died at age eight), Ebenezer, Elizabeth, Mary, and Zachariah. Jabez died on October 5, 1786, at Norwich.

Jabez's son Jedidiah Huntington also served in the American Revolution, and after it was over was collector of customs at New London, Connecticut, for many years.

Jabez's son, Andrew Huntington (born June 21, 1745; died April 7, 1824) engaged in commercial pursuits, and in 1795 was a manufacturer of paper at the falls of Norwich. He was judge of probate in his district in 1813. During the American Revolution he was a commissary of brigade.

Jabez's son Joshua Huntington (born in Norwich, August 16, 1751) began business with his father. After the Battle of Lexington, he commanded a company of 100 men of the town, and joined Putnam's brigade. Subsequently, he was ordered by the Continental Congress to build a frigate of 36 guns, which was constructed in the Thames at Gale's Ferry in 1777.

Jabez's son Ebenezer Huntington served in the American Revolution and then became a member of the United States House of Representatives from Connecticut.
