= Norwichtown =

- Norwichtown Historic District
- U.S. National Register of Historic Places
- U.S. Historic district
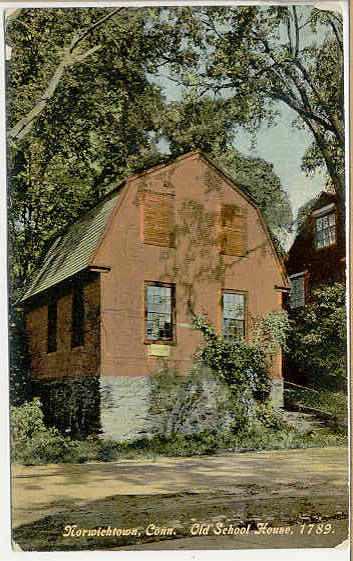
- Old School House

- Location within Connecticut Location within the United States
- Location: Roughly bounded by Huntington Lane, Scotland Road, and Washington, Town and East Town Streets, Norwich, Connecticut
- Coordinates: 41°32′52″N 72°5′33″W
- Area: 110 acres (45 ha)
- Architect: Multiple
- Architectural style: Colonial, Georgian
- NRHP reference No.: 73001951
- Added to NRHP: January 17, 1973

Norwichtown is a historic neighborhood in the city of Norwich, Connecticut, United States. It is generally the area immediately north of the Yantic River between I-395 and Route 169.

The portion of the neighborhood from the Norwichtown Green and east of it is a locally designated historic district that was also listed on the National Register of Historic Places in 1973 as the Norwichtown Historic District. The district includes 48 contributing buildings and one other contributing site over 110 acres (45 ha) area.

The earliest settlement of Norwich, in 1659, was in Norwichtown. Initial settlement, by 35 English settlers who relocated from Saybrook Fort under the leadership of Major John Mason and bought land from Uncas, sachem of the Mohegans, was centered on the Norwichtown Green.

== History ==
The Green is triangular in shape, with an area of about 1.75 acres (0.71 ha). It is surrounded by shade trees and bordered by Town Street, East Town Street and Elm Avenue. These streets are lined with 18th and 19th houses and shops that face the Green. There are four houses in Norwichtown that were built in the 17th century: the 1660 Bradford-Huntington House, built c. 1660; the Olmstead-Lathrop House, dating to c. 1659-1745; Leffingwell House Museum, built c. 1675; and the Simon Huntington House, built c. 1690. The First Congregational Church, built in the Federal style in 1801, was the third building to house the local congregation. Many older homes in the district have been converted to commercial use. The John Mason School is now the central administration for the Norwich Public School System. North of the town's first schoolhouse is the Colonial Cemetery where four Connecticut governors are buried. Four houses from the 17th century remain standing north of the Green area is Meeting House Hill, a cliff of large rocks that is also known as the Meeting House Rocks. It was on this cliff that the village's second and third meetinghouses were established, with the site used as a lookout point. The memorial on top of the rocks and pathway are cared for by the First Congregational Church.

Five buildings included in the historic district are separately listed on the National Register of Historic Places. These are the saltbox Leffingwell Inn, the Joseph Carpenter Silversmith Shop, built c. 1772-1774; the Dr. Daniel Lathrop School, one of Connecticut's oldest remaining brick schoolhouses, which dates to 1782; the Bradford-Huntington House at 16 Huntington Lane; and the Gen. Jedidiah Huntington House at 23 East Town Street.

Norwichtown was the old center of Norwich, when the town was settled primarily as a farming community in the late 17th century. By the early 18th century, the focus of Norwich became the harbor facilities in the adjacent Chelsea neighborhood east and south of the town center, and eventually the 'center' of Norwich became the small urban center at Chelsea, which was also ringed with industrial mills. The establishment of the city of Norwich in 1784 centered on the Chelsea neighborhood necessitated the distinction of calling the old town center 'Norwichtown'. The city of Norwich was consolidated with the town of Norwich in 1952 relegating Norwichtown to become a residential neighborhood of the city of Norwich.

As Chelsea Parade became a more populated residential district, the residents wanted a church closer than those in Norwichtown. Therefore, the Park Congregational Church was built right next to Chelsea Parade. Stephen C. Earle of Worcester Massachusetts designed the Park Congregational Church and the church was built in 1873. The church was built in the Romanesque revival style.

The Teel House originally built, as a hotel is also located on Chelsea Parade. Joseph Teel of Preston built the Hotel in 1789. The Hotel was known for its fine halls and splendid ballrooms. After Mr. Teel's death, the hotel was converted into a boarding school and day school. Today the Teel House is a residence. The house has an impressive center hall plan and contains eight fireplaces.

One of the main streets running through Norwichtown and adjacent to Chelsea Green is Washington Street. Along Washington Street is the house of Charles A. Converse. This gothic-styled house was built c. 1870 and is most notable for its steeply pitched roofs and the red and gray roof slates. However, the owner, Charles Converse, is noted more for the Converse Art Gallery that he gave to the Norwich Free Academy, less than a block away. Traveling further down Washington Street away from Norwich town there are many other Historic Houses, such as the Learned-Aiken House, Vernet-Lee House, the Eliza Huntington Memorial Home, and the Lathrop-Brewer House.

Running parallel to Washington Street is Broadway. One interesting House located at 189 Broadway is the De Witt House-Lydia Huntley Sigourney School. The house was built in the late eighteenth century. In 1812 the house was used a school for young ladies. Lydia Huntley conducted the school with her friend Nancy Maria Hyde until she was forced to close the school once Hyde became ill.

Continuing down Washington Street toward Norwich town is the most famous of historic homes in Norwich, the Leffingwell Inn. Stephen Backus built the original house in 1675. In 1700, Thomas Leffingwell 2nd, the son of Norwich co-founder Thomas Leffingwell, bought the house and converted the original two-room house into an inn. The Tavern Hall, to the right of the entrance is the original part of the house and exhibits one of the few remaining, completely paneled rooms from the century. The House also includes fine works from Norwich silversmiths and clock makers of the 1700s. Christopher Leffingwell, the son of Thomas commissioned Thomas Harland to design a clock for the North Parlor that is still hung in the same exact place that Christopher originally hung the clock. Also, in 1776 supposedly George Washington ate breakfast at the Leffingwell Inn.

Further into Norwich town is the Joshua Prior House. Joshua Prior built the house in 1766. The house still has the original fluted pilasters over the doorways and six-paneled raised double front door.

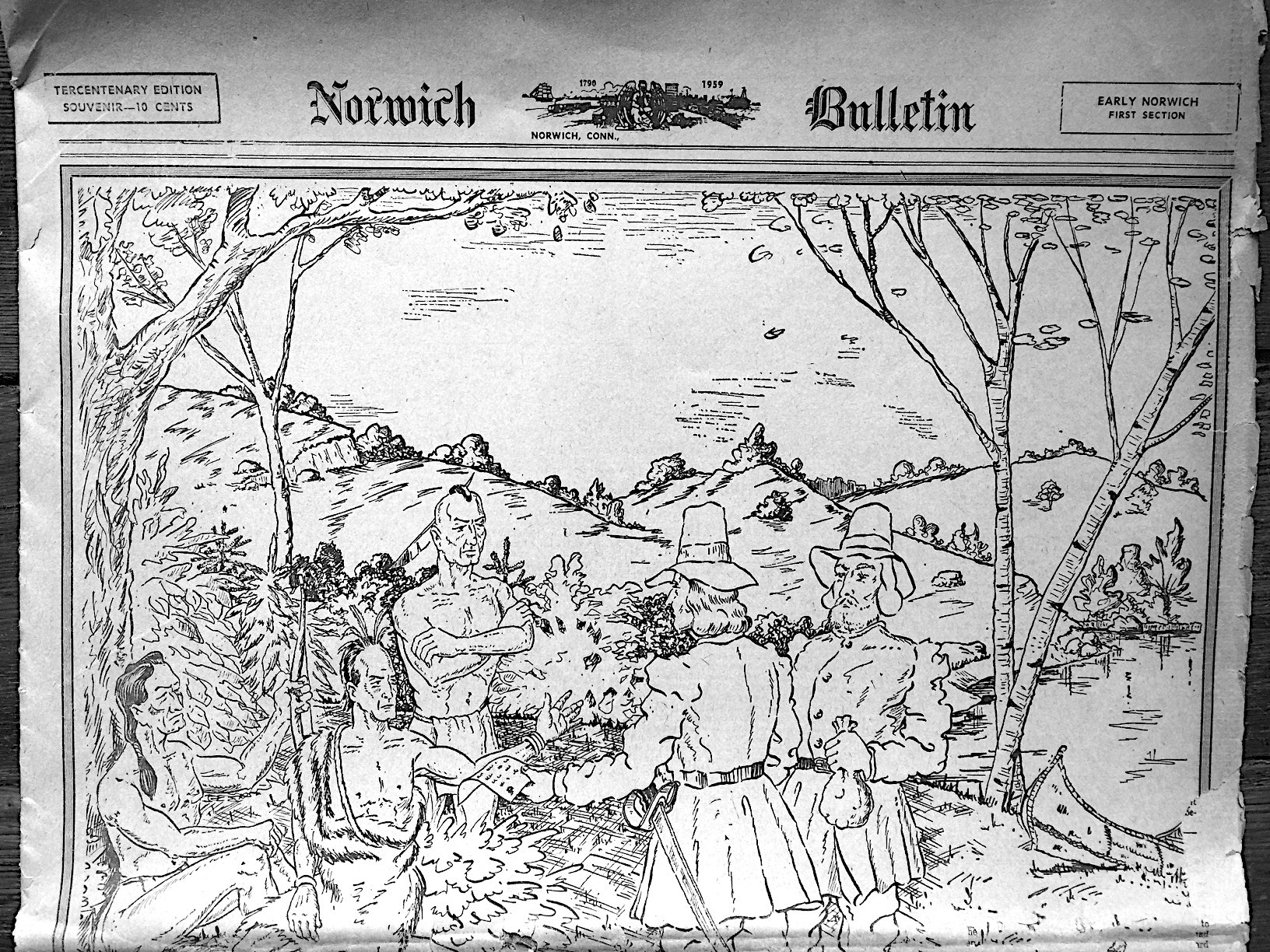
Nine Square Miles Purchase 1659

Dr. Joshua Lathrop House was built in 1763. This house was built in two sections, a saltbox section and then a three-bay Georgian Section. The house has been restored and it still has original fireplaces including a nine- foot cooking fireplace.

Samuel Huntington, signer of the Declaration of Independence, president of the Continental Congress, first President of the United States under the Articles of Confederation, and governor of Connecticut, lived in Norwichtown. His house is located to the east of the Green and he is buried in the Old Norwichtown Burying Ground. Samuel Huntington Elementary School on West Town Street in Norwichtown, a public school operated by Norwich Public Schools, is named for him.

Fairview Reservoir, one of Norwich's backup reservoirs, is between Canterbury Turnpike and Scotland Road in Norwichtown.

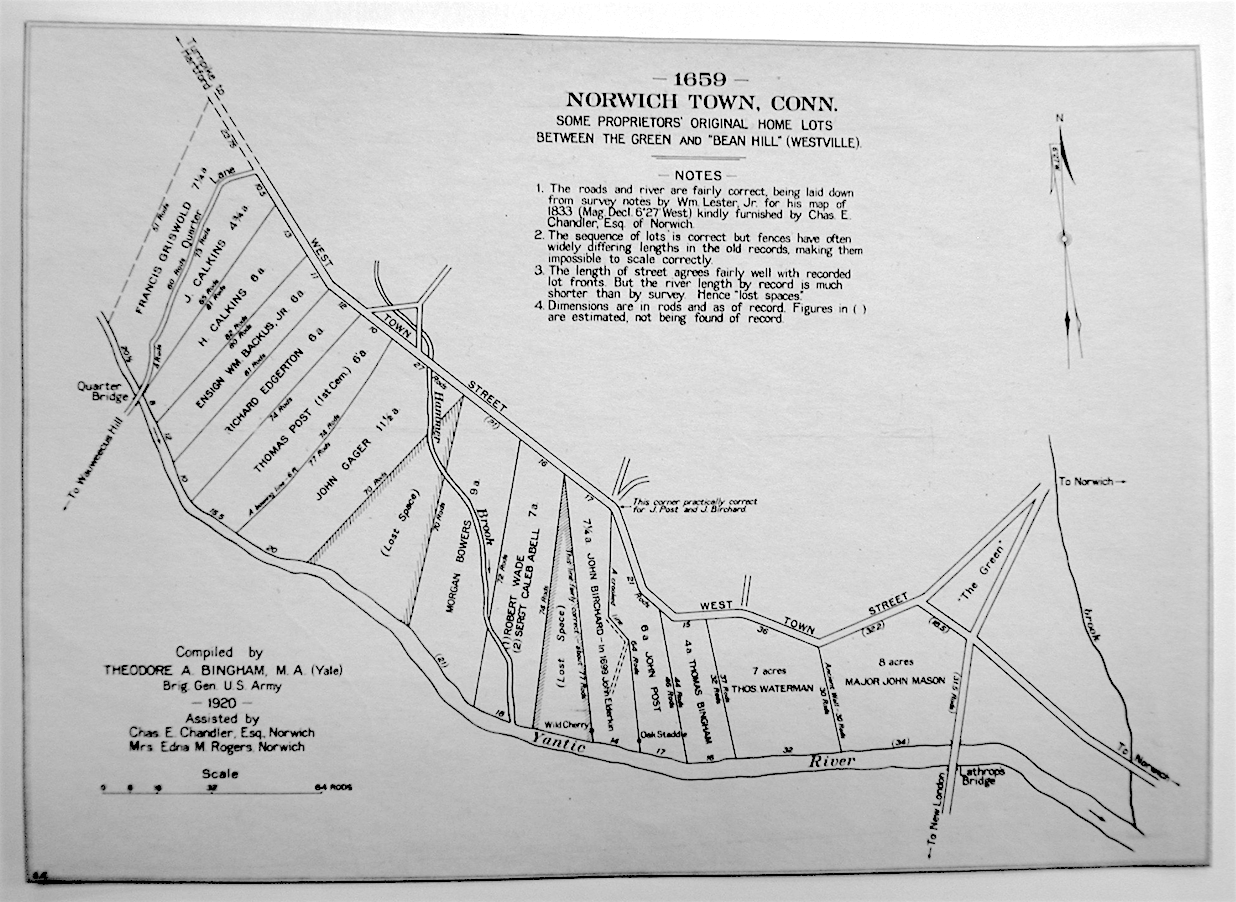
Original Home Lots

== Norwichtown Historic District ==
This district was listed on the National Register of Historic Places (NRHP) in 1973. By then, the district was already a local historic district. The National Register application was promoted by the local historic commission, in connection to its opposition to the demolition of a building in the district area. The local commission sought the listing "for the prestige and status that is sometimes found in the recognition by not only a State agency but the Federal government."

The district includes much of the original settlement area of the town. It includes the Norwichtown Green and Old Norwichtown Burying Ground and "has irregular boundaries on the radiating Streets." The district consists of two parts: one includes the Green and stretches down to the Leffingwell museum at Washington and Town Streets. A smaller, separated part includes six buildings on Harland Road and/or Harland Place.

The district's 110 acres (45 ha) area includes 48 contributing buildings and one other contributing site.

The district is defined to exclude a large commercial mall, the Norwichtown Mall, and other non-historic areas.

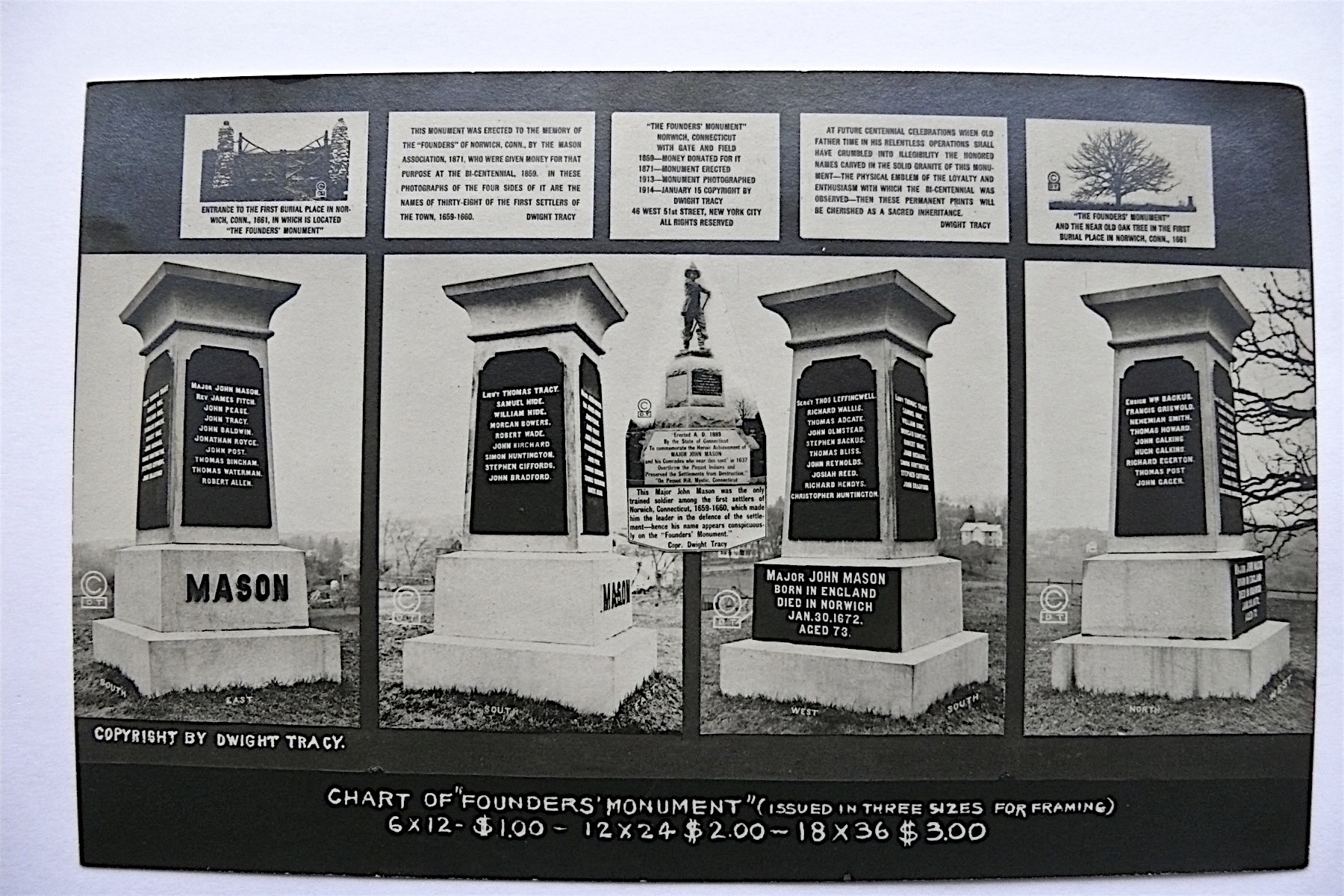
Founders Monument

Two "outstanding" buildings in the district, both located on the Norwichtown Green, are the Dr. Daniel Lathrop School and the Joseph Carpenter Silversmith Shop. The school, built in 1783, is believed to be one of the earliest brick schoolhouses still surviving in Connecticut.

There are five separately NRHP-listed buildings in the district: the Bradford-Huntington House, at 16 Huntington Lane; Joseph Carpenter Silversmith Shop, at 71 East Town Street; the 1798 East District School, at 365 Washington Street; the Gen. Jedidiah Huntington House, at 23 East Town Street; and Leffingwell Inn, a saltbox at 348 Washington Street, in the southeast corner of the first part of the district.

Washington Street includes many pre-1800 homes.

The historic district includes part of the original area of the 1660 settlement of Norwichtown. More than 300 years later, the pattern of development is still similar.

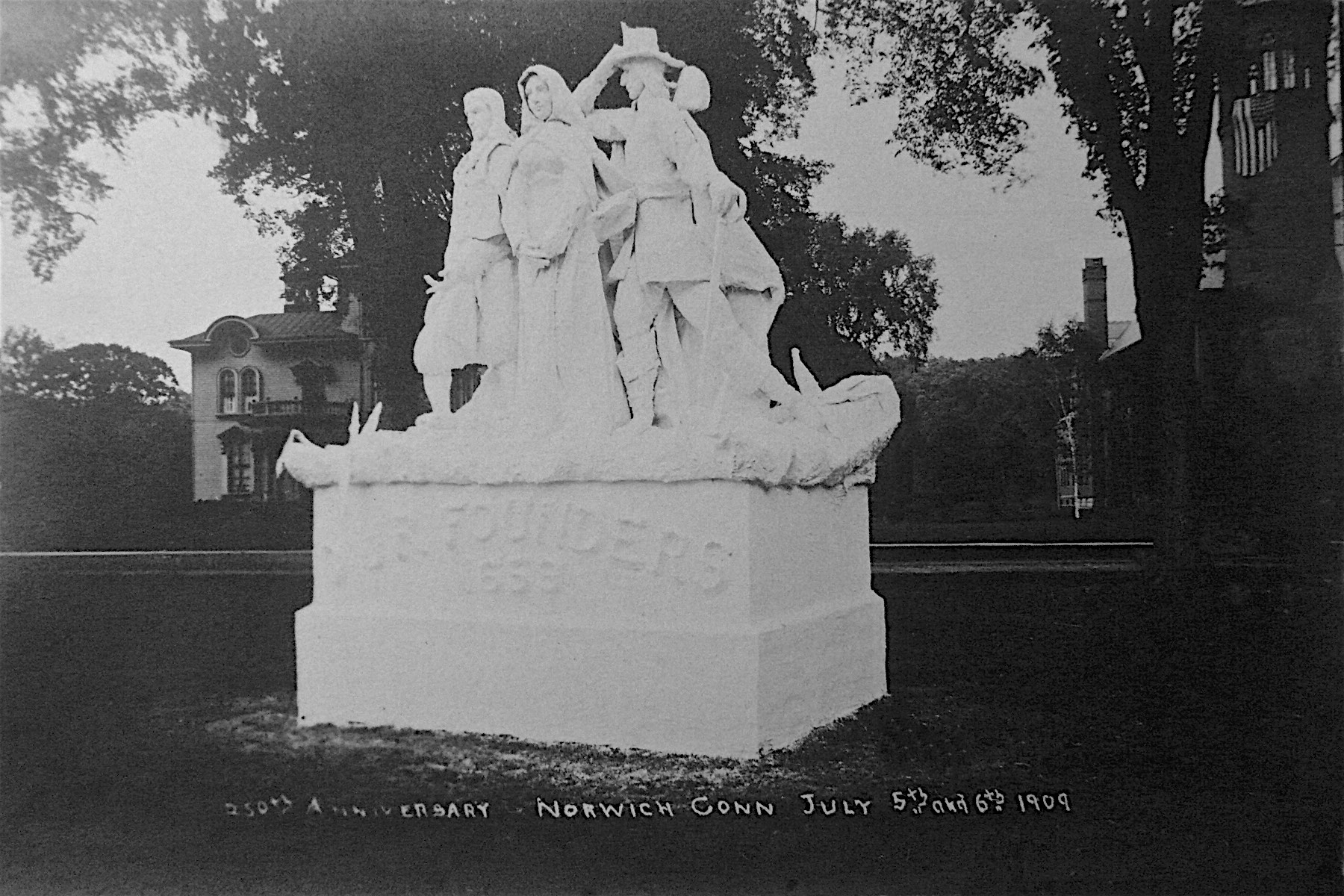
350th Monument

== Gallery ==
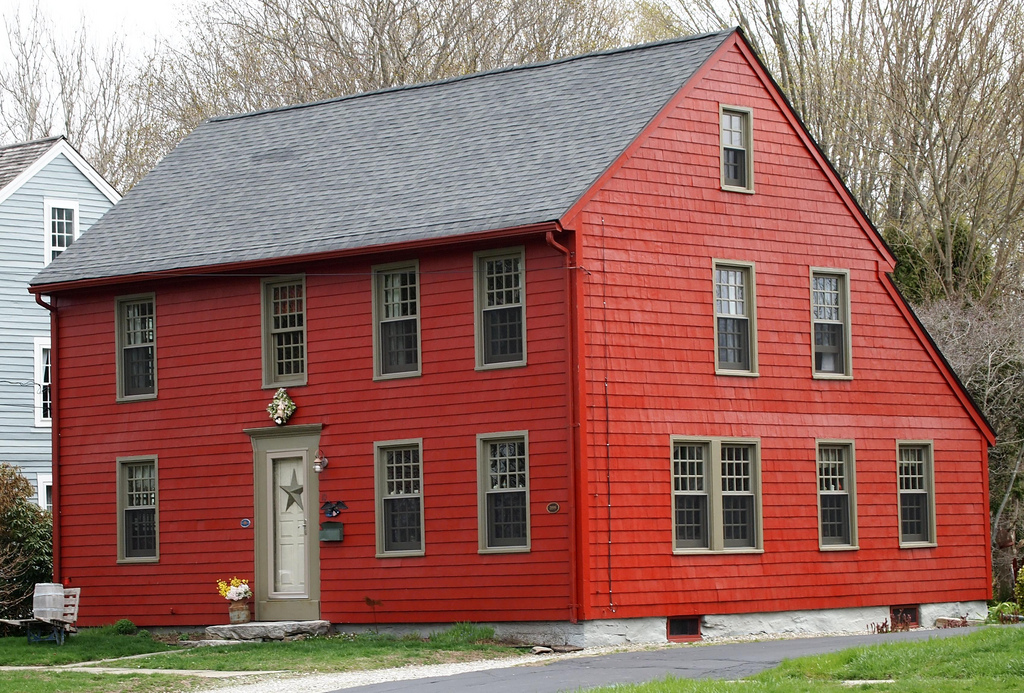
Sylvanus Jones House (1734)

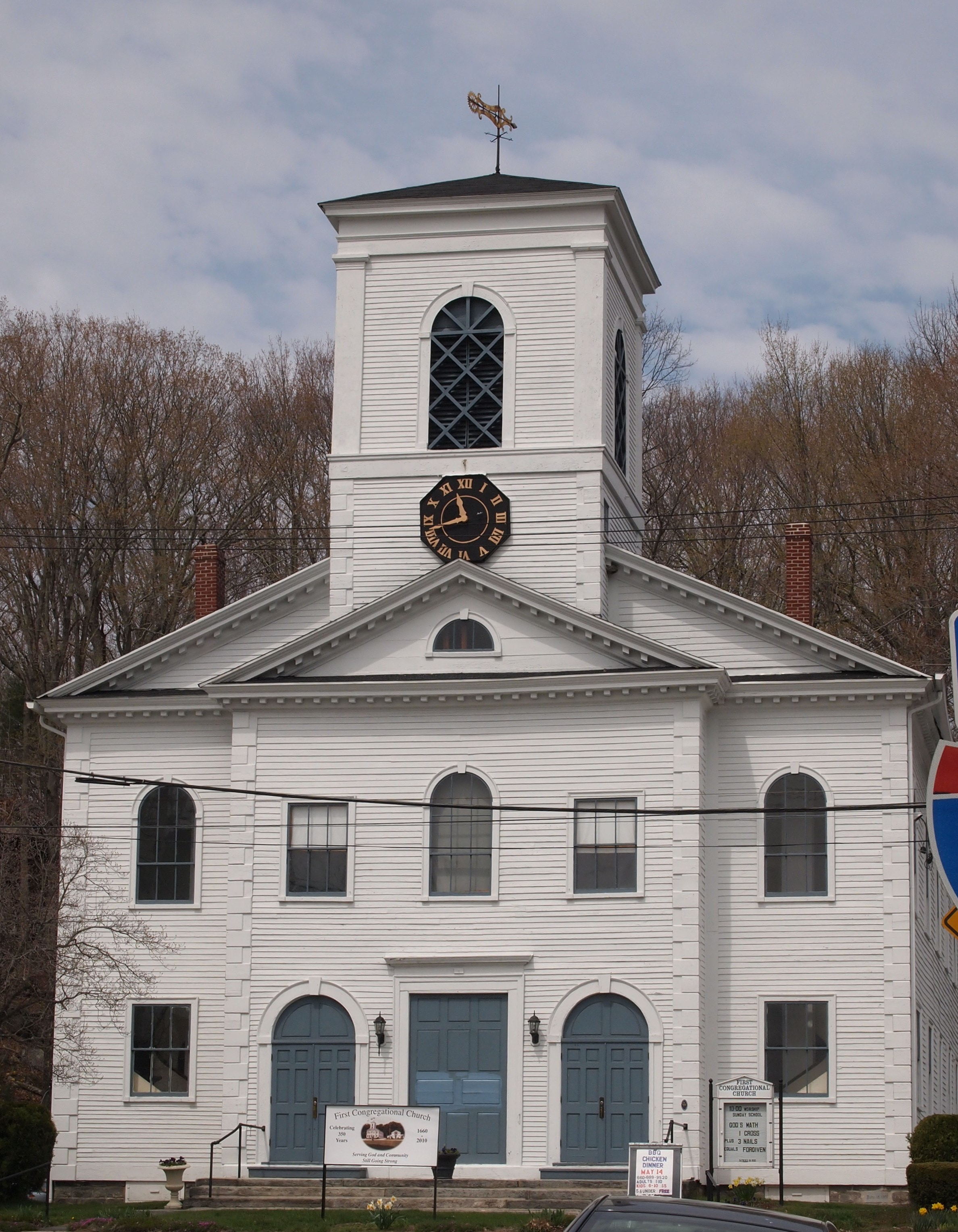
First Congregational Church fifth construction, 1801.

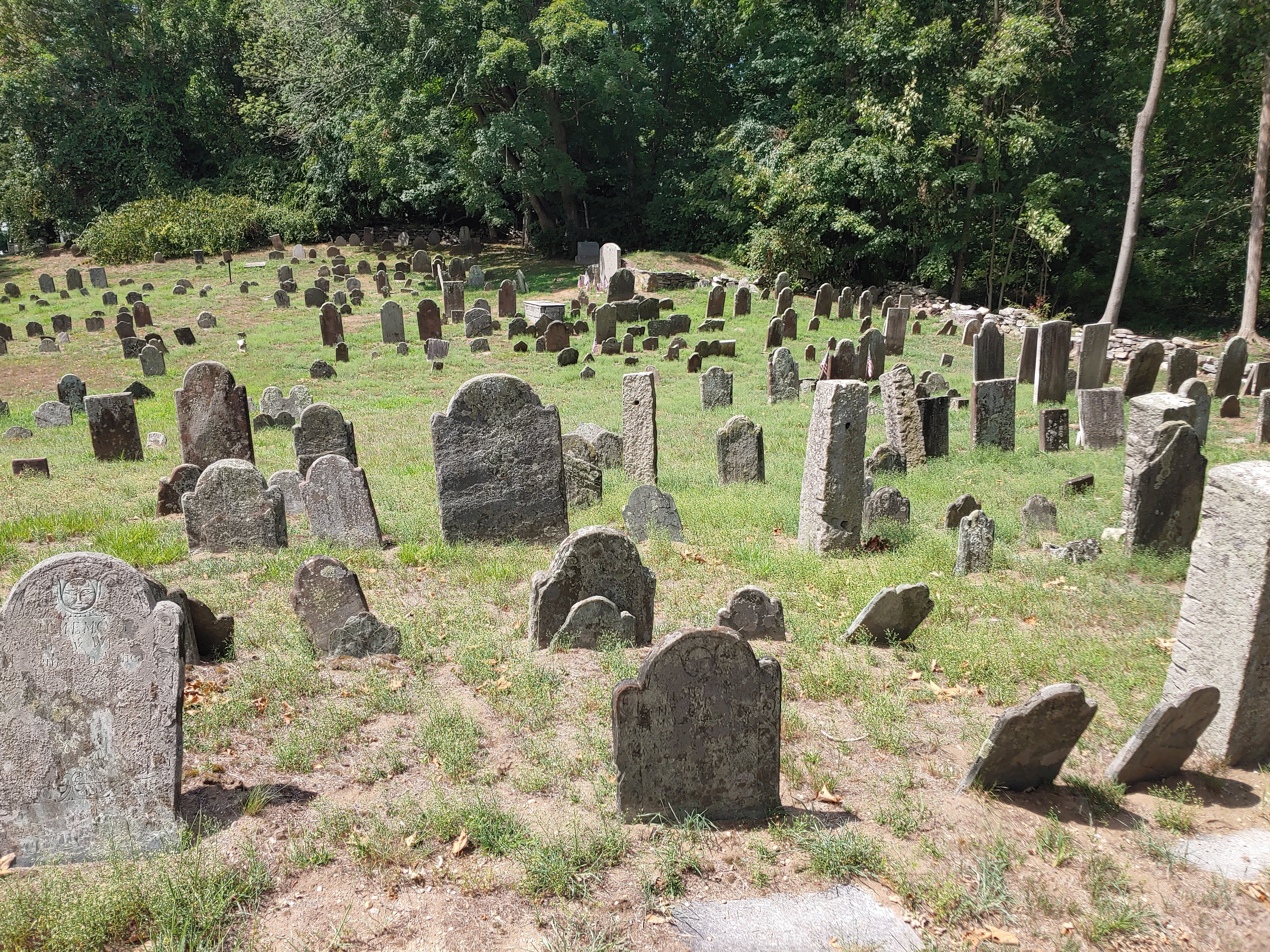
Old Norwichtown Burying Ground

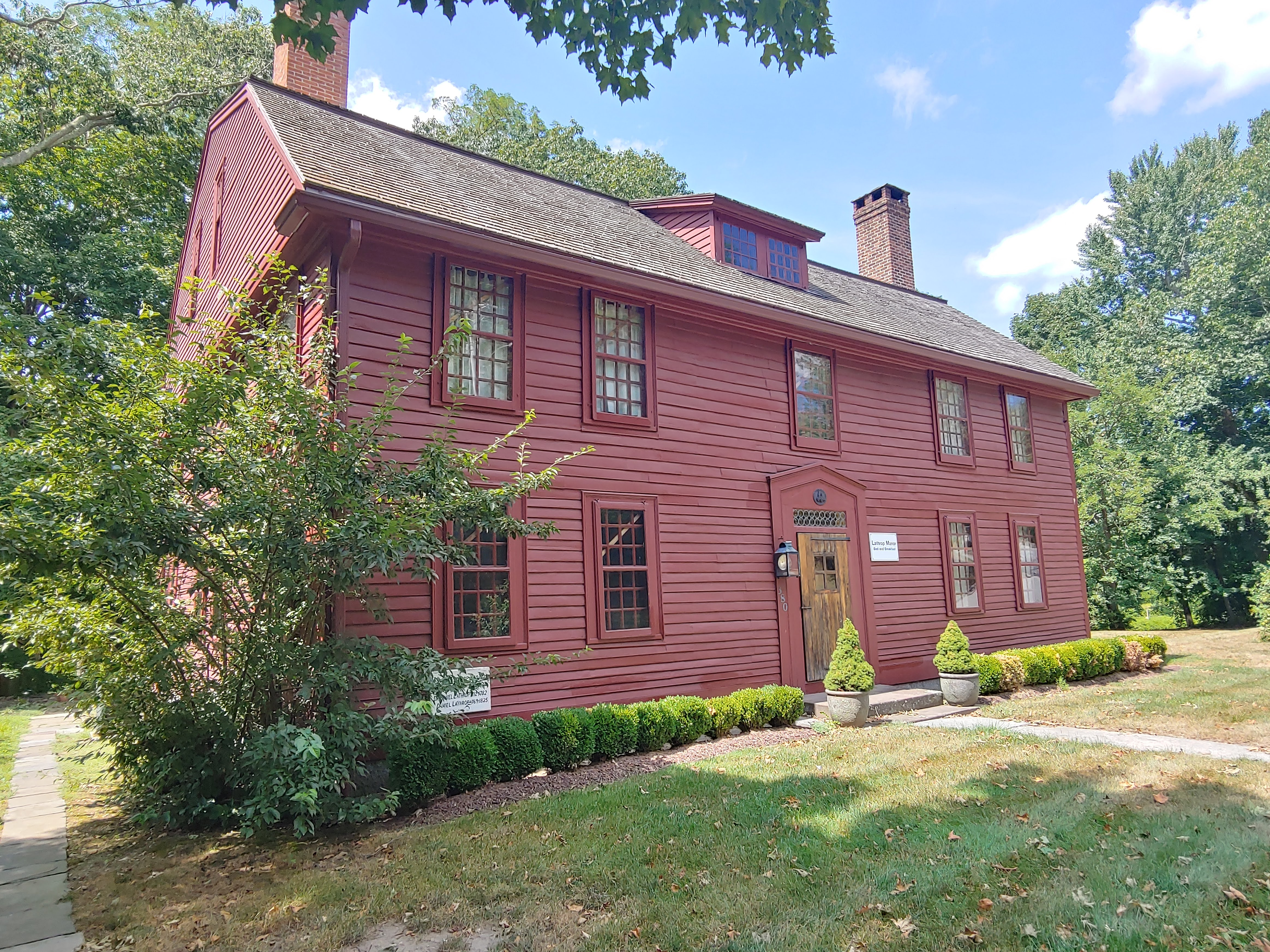
Lathrop Manor built 1745.

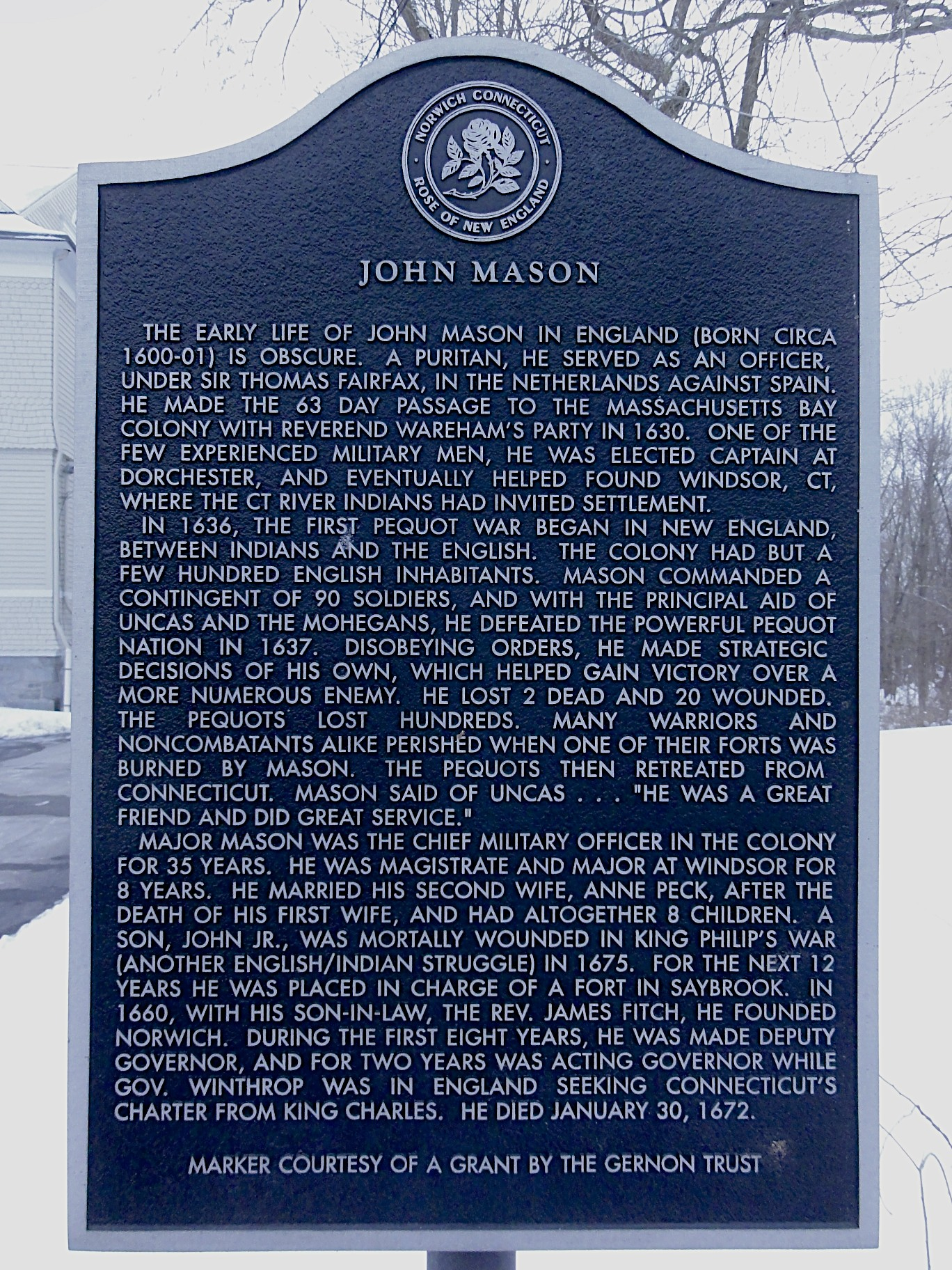
John Mason Plaque

== See also ==
- Neighborhoods of Norwich, Connecticut
- National Register of Historic Places listings in New London County, Connecticut
