= List of Connecticut placenames of Native American origin =

The following list includes settlements, geographic features, and political subdivisions of Connecticut whose names are derived from Native American languages.

== Listings ==
=== State ===
- Connecticut – from some Eastern Algonquian language of southern New England (perhaps Mahican), meaning "at the long tidal river" (after the Connecticut River).

=== Settlements ===
- Aspetuck: (Paugussett) "at the high place"
  - Shared with the Aspetuck River.
- Cos Cob: (Mohegan from Cassacubque) "high rocks"
- Hockanum: (Podunk) "hook"
  - Shared with the Hockanum River.
- Massapeag: (Mohegan) "place at the large cove"
- Mohegan: named after the Mohegan people.
- Mianus River (and town): (Paugussett) a 17th-century chief's name – "Mianu/Mayanno's"
- Moodus): (Wangunk) from "mache moodus" or "bad noises"
  - Shared with the Moodus River and Moodus Reservoir.
- Moosup: (Narragansett) a chief named "Mausup"
- Mystic River (and town): (Pequot-Mohegan) "great tidal river"
- Naugatuck River (and town): (Quinnipiac) "single tree"
- Niantic River (and town): tribe; "point of land on tidal river"
- Norwalk River (and city): (Algonquian) noyank or "point of land" or from the name Naramauk.
- Oronoque: (Quinnipiac) "curved place" or "land at the bend"
- Pequabuck: (Wangunk) "clear, open pond"
- Poquonock Bridge: (Algonquian – several) "cleared land"
  - Shared with the Poquonock River.
- Poquetanuck: (Mohegan) "land broken up" (like dried mud cracking)
- Quinebaug: (Nipmuck) "long pond"
  - Shared with the Quinebaug River.
- Scitico: (Nipmuck) "land at the river branch"
- Taconic: (Mahican) "steep ascent"
- Uncasville: (Mohegan) 17th-century chief's name (wonkus – "fox")
- Willimantic River (and town): (Mohegan or Nipmuck) "good cedar swamp"
- Yantic: (Mohegan) "as far as the tide goes up this side of the river".
  - Shared with the Yantic River.

=== Bodies of water ===
- Congamuck Ponds (on Maine border Congamond Lake): (Nipmuck) "long fishing place"
- Coginchaug River: (Wangunk) "place where fish are dried/cured"
- Housatonic River: (Mahican) from the Mohican phrase "usi-a-di-en-uk", "beyond the mountain"
- Mashapaug Pond: (Nipmuck) "large pond"
- Menunketesuck River (and Menunketesuck Island): (Hammonasset) "strong flowing stream"
- Natchaug River: (Nipmuck) "between rivers"
- Nepaug Reservoir: (Wangunk) "fresh pond"
- Pachaug River (and pond): (Narragansett) "at the turning place"
- Pataguanset Lake: (Niantic) "at the round, shallow place"
- Pawcatuck River (Rhode Island border): (Niantic/Pequot) "the clear divided (tidal) stream"
- Pistapaug Pond: (Quinnipiac) "muddy pond"
- Pocotopaug Lake: (Wangunk) "divided pond" or "two ponds"
- Quaddick Reservoir: (Nipmuck) "bend in river" or (Narragansett) "boggy place"
- Lake Quassapaug: (Quinnipiac) "big pond" or "big rock"
- Quinnipiac River: (Quinnipiac) "where we change our route"
- Lake Quonnipaug: (Quinnipiac) "long pond"
- Saugatuck River: (Paugussett) "outlet of the tidal river"
- Shenipsit Lake: (Mohegan) "at the great pool"
- Shepaug River: (Tunxis) "great pond"
- Shetucket River: (Mohegan) "land between rivers"
- Shunock River: (Mohegan) "stony place" or possibly "place between streams"
- Skungamug River: (Nipmuck) "eel-fishing place"
- Wangum Lake: (Paugussett) "bend/crooked"
- Wangumbaug Lake: (Nipmuck) "crooked pond"
- Lake Waramaug: (Mahican) "good fishing-place"
- Winnepauk: (Mahican) "beautiful pond"
- Wononpacook Pond: (Mahican) "land at the bend in the pond"
- Wononskopomuc Lake: (Mahican) "rocks at the bend in the lake"
- Wopowaug River: (Wangunk) "crossing-place"
- Wyassup Lake: (Mohegan) "flags" or "rushes"

=== Islands ===
- Cockenoe Island: (Montauk) from the name of a 17th-century native interpreter

=== Other ===
- Connecticut, the state, and river: (in several dialects) "place of the long river" or "by the long tidal stream"
- Hammonassett Point: (Hammonassett) "place of sand bars"“where we dig holes in the ground,”
- Mohawk Mountain: eastern Iroquois tribe; Algonquian term for their western enemies – "wolves," "hungry animals," or "cannibals"
- Sachem Head: (Algonquian/general) "chief"

== See also ==
- List of place names in the United States of Native American origin
