= Yantic Falls Historic District =

Historic district in Connecticut, United States

- U.S. National Register of Historic Places
- U.S. Historic district
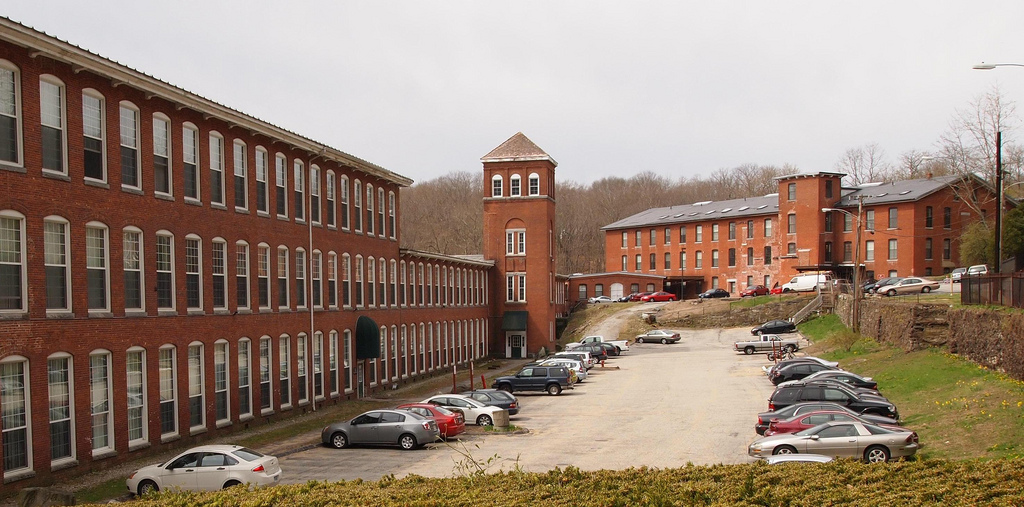

- Location within Connecticut Location within the United States
- Location: Yantic Street, Norwich, Connecticut
- Coordinates: 41°32′1″N 72°5′19″W
- Area: 10 acres (4.0 ha)
- NRHP reference No.: 72001344
- Added to NRHP: June 28, 1972

The Yantic Falls Historic District encompasses a historic mill and associated worker housing on Yantic Street in Norwich, Connecticut. The 10-acre (4.0 ha) area includes a complex of mill buildings, mainly built in brick, and mill worker housing, also out of brick. The area's industrial history dates to the early 19th century. The district was listed on the National Register of Historic Places on June 28, 1972.

== Description and history ==
Yantic Falls is located on the Yantic River northwest of downtown Norwich, dropping 40 feet (12 m) through a narrow slot now spanned by a railroad bridge and a footbridge. Yantic Street is an L-shaped dead-end street providing access to the large mill complex located below the falls. It includes an array of mill buildings, many of them dating to the second half of the 19th century. They are typically built of brick, with windows set either in rectangular openings with granite headers, or in segmented-arch openings with soldier brick headers. One of the area's oldest buildings is a stone structure built out of ashlar granite; it is located between the larger complex and the falls. Lining Yantic Street are a series of houses, mainly duplexes and other multi-unit configurations, built as worker housing.

In addition to their industrial history, the Yantic Falls figure in the area's Native American history, as the supposed site of the last major battle between members of the Mohegan and Narragansett peoples during the Pequot War in the 1640s. The first known industrial use of the water power provided by the falls was a nail factory established in 1813. This was rapidly followed by other businesses, including a paper mill and a textile mill. Many of these early businesses failed during financial panics in the 1830s, and the water rights around the falls were consolidated into a single business, the Yantic Falls Company, in the 1860s.

== In Literature ==
In her poem Falls of the Yantic, Lydia Sigourney recalls how she played with friends after school in the vicinity and that, following the later introduction of the mill-wheel, although the falls were much reduced, she loved them still.

== Gallery ==
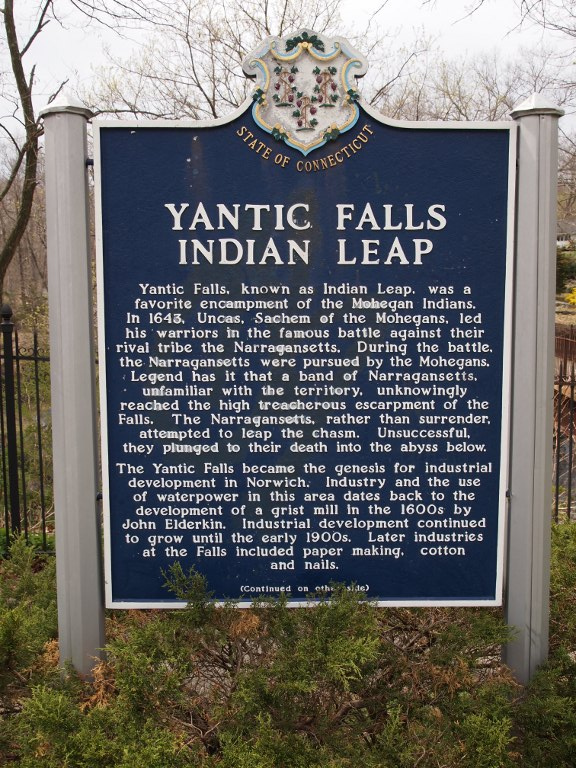
Yantic Falls Historic District sign

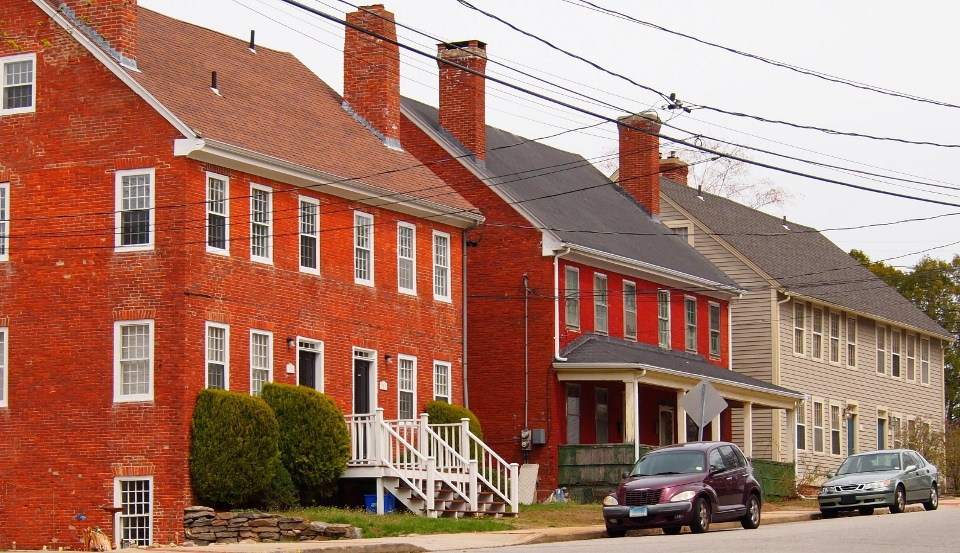
Mill housing

== See also ==
- National Register of Historic Places listings in New London County, Connecticut
- Commonwealth Works Site
- Neighborhoods of Norwich, Connecticut
