= Senator Hough =

Senator Hough may refer to:

- Alanson Hodges Hough (1803–1886), Connecticut State Senate
- Benjamin Hough (1773–1819), Ohio State Senate
- Lincoln Hough (born 1982), Missouri State Senate
- Michael Hough (politician) (born 1979), Maryland State Senate
- Olmstead Hough (1797–1865), Michigan State Senate
- Ralph D. Hough (born 1943), New Hampshire State Senate

== See also ==
- Senator Huff (disambiguation)
