= Minnie Island =

Minnie Island may refer to the following islands:

- Minnie Island, Connecticut - see Minnie Island State Park
- Minnie Island, Montgomery County, Maryland - see List of islands of Maryland
- Minnie Island, British Columbia, Canada, near Stephens Island (British Columbia)
