= Yantic Woolen Company Mill =

- U.S. National Register of Historic Places
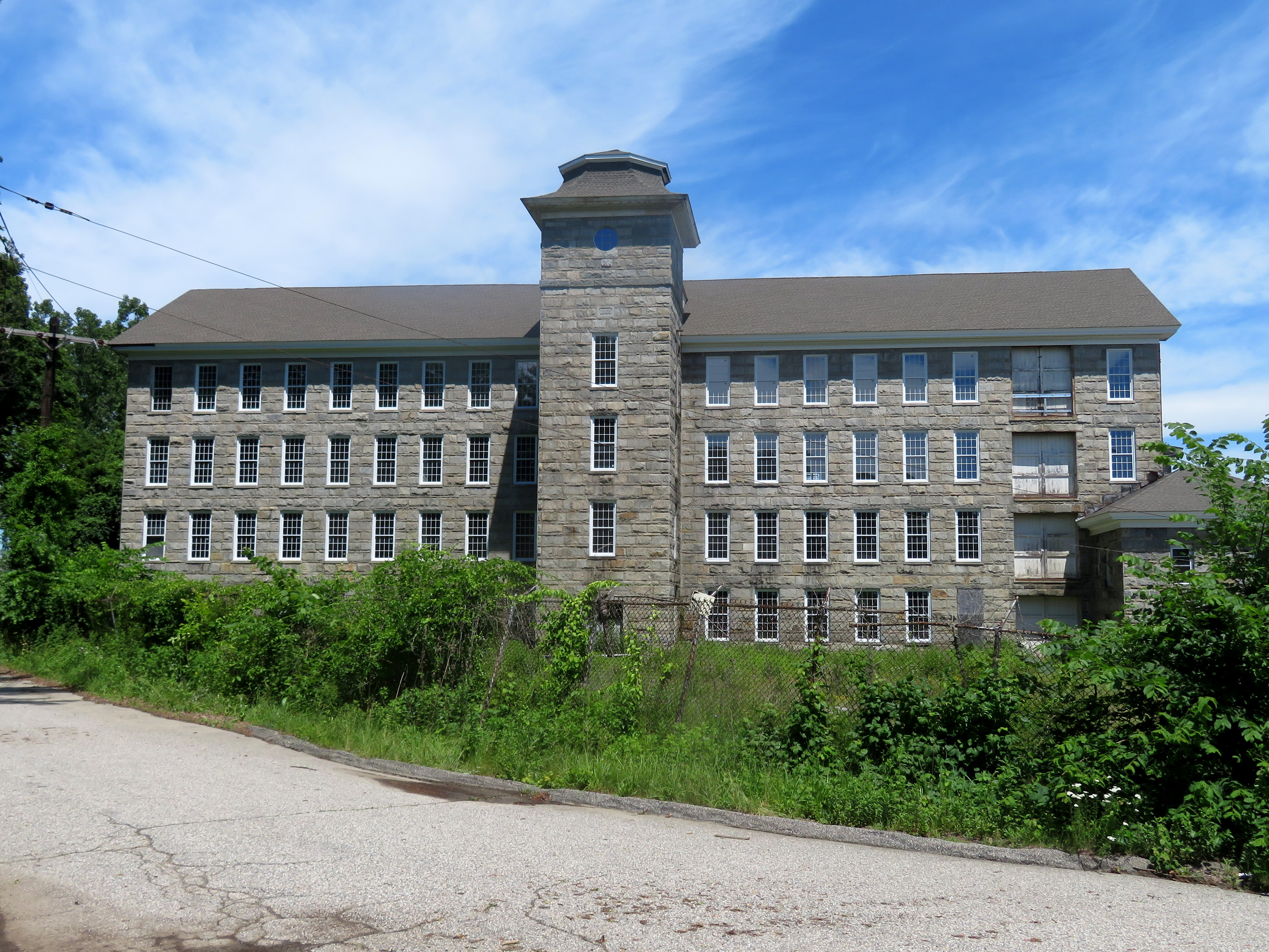
- Yantic Woolen Company Mill in June 2021
- Location: 6 Franklin Road, Norwich, Connecticut
- Coordinates: 41°33′38″N 72°7′30″W
- Area: 7 acres (2.8 ha)
- Built: 1865
- NRHP reference No.: 96000780
- Added to NRHP: July 25, 1996

The Yantic Woolen Company Mill, also known as the Hale Company Mill, is a mill complex located at the junction of Chapel Hill and Yantic Roads in northwestern Norwich, Connecticut. Built in 1865, the stone mill is a well-preserved example of mid-19th century textile mill architecture, and was the major economic force in the village of Yantic, where it stands. The mill was listed on the National Register of Historic Places on July 25, 1996.

== Description and history ==
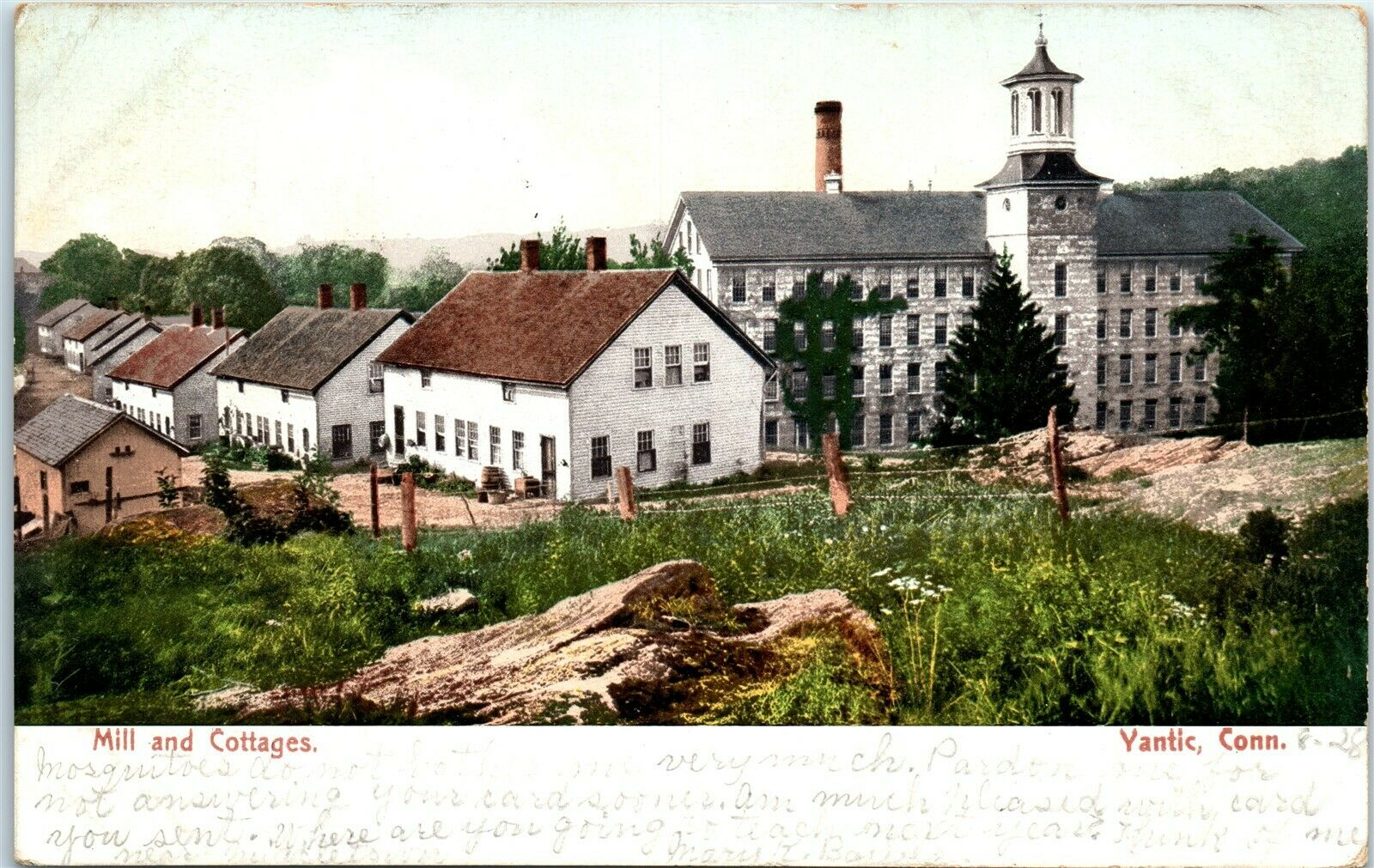
Early-20th-century postcard of the mill and nearby worker housing

Sandwiched between the Yantic River and the limited-access highway carrying Connecticut Route 2, the mill is connected to the river by Yantic Road. Its main building is a large 4-1/2 story ashlar stone structure with a five-story square tower at its center. The tower was originally capped by an octagonal belfry, which has not survived. The main mill is connected to a series of smaller buildings, also stone. The mill was powered by water delivered from the river via a stone headrace that ran from a dam (no longer standing) about 0.5 miles (0.80 km) to the northwest.

The mill complex dates to 1865, when it was built by E. Winslow Williams on the site of an older mill, built by his father, which had been destroyed by fire. The mill was the economic engine of Yantic well into the 20th century, with textile production ending in 1989. It originally produced flannel, employing 150 workers at its peak output. The village that surrounds the mill has been reduced in size, with the owner's house and tracts of worker housing demolished to make way for the construction of Connecticut Route 2.

== See also ==
- National Register of Historic Places listings in New London County, Connecticut
