= Elijah Baldwin Huntington =

American writer

Elijah Baldwin Huntington (August 14, 1816 – December 27, 1877) was an American minister and author.

== Early life ==
Huntington, the eldest son of Deacon Nehemiah and Nancy (née Leffingwell) Huntington, was born in Bozrah, Connecticut, on August 14, 1816. He entered Yale College as part of the class of 1850, but by ill-health and want of means he was obliged to leave college at the beginning of the Sophomore year, but in 1851 the degree of Master of Arts was conferred on him, and his name has subsequently been enrolled with his class.

== Career ==
He taught school in Connecticut for several years, going over in the meantime the regular college studies and also pursuing a theological course, and in 1845 he was licensed to preach by the New London Association of Congregational ministers.

After laboring for the American Bible Society, he was engaged in organizing a church in Putnam village in Windham County, Conn., which had lately begun to form about a station of the Norwich and Worcester Railroad, and which is included in the present town of Putnam. Here he was ordained in November, 1848.

His voice failing, he was dismissed from this charge after two years' service, and in the spring of 1851 became the principal of a school in West Meriden, Conn. In the fall of 1852 he was invited to Waterbury, Conn., as principal of the high school, and superintendent of the other schools of the city. He removed again in December, 1854, to Stamford, Conn., where he had charge of a public school until 1857, when he opened a private school for boys, which he continued until 1864. He then devoted himself to literary labor, residing in Stamford until April, 1875, when he became acting pastor of the Congregational Church in South Coventry, Conn.

He retired from this service in April 1877, and continued a resident of the town until his death.

== Personal life ==
On March 6, 1843, Huntington was married to Julia Maria, daughter of Deacon Thomas Welch, of Windham, Conn., who survived him without children. Huntington published in 1863, A Genealogical Memoir of the Huntington Family, and in 1869, Stamford Soldiers' Memorial.

He was prostrated by an attack of paralysis in November 1877, and after lingering for more than a month, died December 27, in the 62d year of his age.
