= Hopemead State Park =

State park in New London County, Connecticut

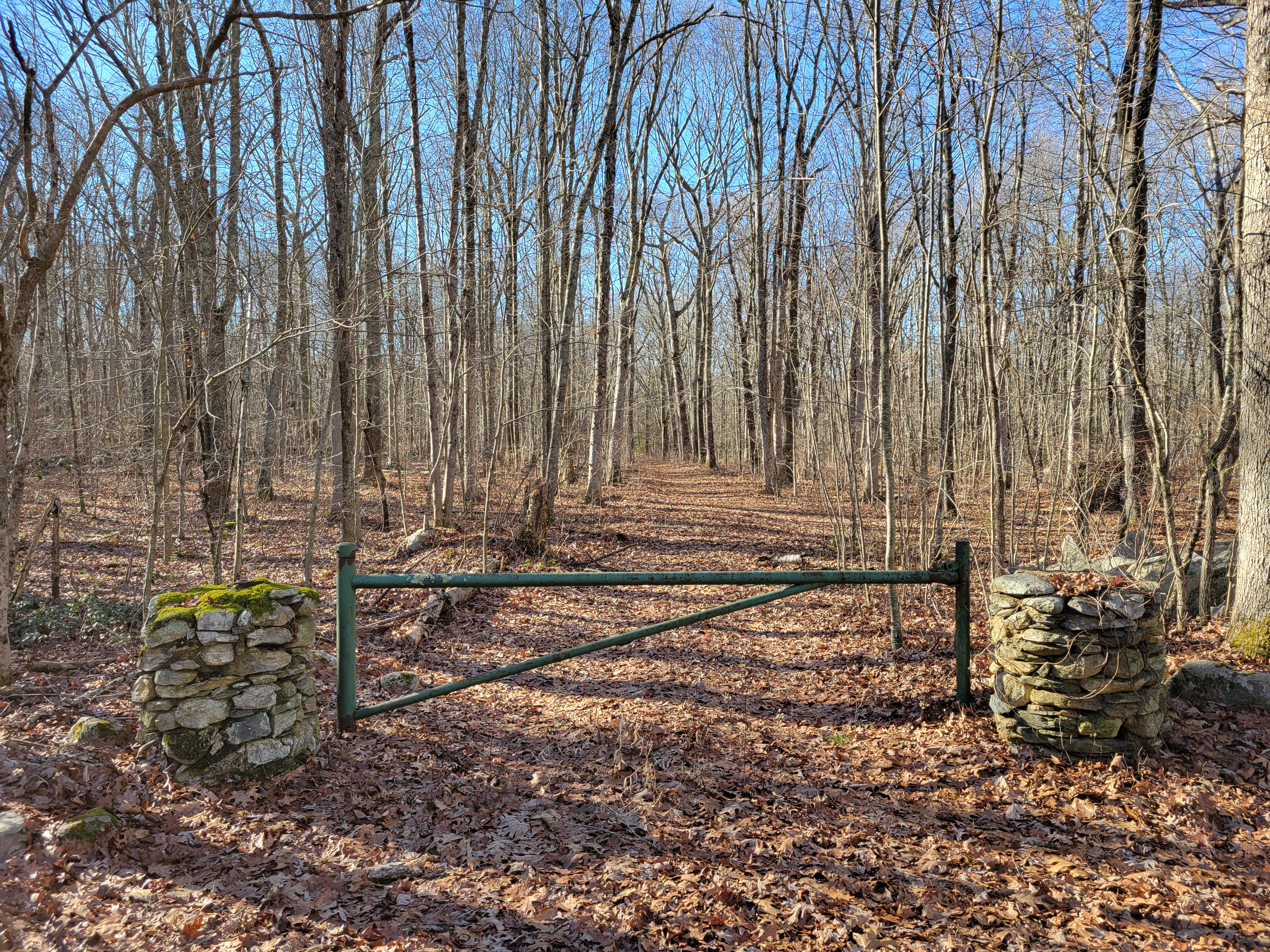
- Park entrance

- Location within Connecticut Location within the United States
- Interactive map of Hopemead State Park
- Location: Bozrah and Montville, Connecticut, United States
- Coordinates: 41°31′02″N 72°13′03″W
- Area: 60 acres (24 ha)
- Elevation: 377 ft (115 m)
- Established: 1954
- Administrator: Connecticut Department of Energy and Environmental Protection
- Website: Official website
- Connecticut state parks

Hopemead State Park is an undeveloped public recreation area on the eastern shore of Gardner Lake, 8 miles (13 km) west of Norwich, Connecticut. The state park covers 60 acres (24 ha) in the towns of Bozrah and Montville and is managed by the Connecticut Department of Energy and Environmental Protection.

== History ==
The park lands were purchased in 1954 with funds bequeathed by George Dudley Seymour. Seymour's trustees acquired the land from the children of James E. Fuller, who had bought them when they were the lakeside farm of Salomon Gardner. The donation of the land to the state was announced in 1955. At the time of the donation, the site included a main house, summer lodge, carriage house, and barn. The structures were torn down and the site allowed to return to its natural state.

== Activities and amenities ==
The undeveloped site offers opportunities for hiking and fishing. The main trail runs through forested land for a little over a mile from Cottage Road to Gardner Lake.
