= Ishmail Spicer =

American composer

Ishmael (Ishmail) Spicer (1760–1832) was a publisher in Baltimore, a teacher, and one of the first American composers.

Ishmael Spicer was born in Bozrah, Connecticut. He founded the first singing school at the Court House in Baltimore in November 1789, basing the curriculum using a teaching system advocated by Andrew Adgate. Tuition was set at $2.50 per quarter and the school was successful for multiple years.

For a time the singing school was attended by John Cole.

== Publications ==
Philadelphia Harmony with Andrew Adgate, Philadelphia, 1789.

Spicer's Pocket Companion: or the young Mason's monitor, 1799 (printed by Andrew Wright in Northampton).
