= USS Moccasin (1864) =

Gunboat of the United States Navy

History

United States
- Builder: S. & J. M. Flanagan
- Acquired: 11 July 1864
- Commissioned: 14 July 1864
- Fate: Sold 1865

General characteristics
- Class & type: Wood screw tug
- Displacement: 192 tons
- Length: 14 ft 5 in (4.39 m)
- Beam: 22 ft 3 in (6.78 m)
- Draught: 7 ft 7 in (2.31 m)
- Speed: 10 knots
- Armament: 3 12‑pdr. r.

The first USS Moccasin, a wood screw tug, was built as Hero in 1864 at Philadelphia, Pennsylvania and purchased by the US Navy on 11 July 1864 from S. & J. M. Flanagan at Philadelphia; and commissioned 14 July 1864 at Philadelphia Navy Yard, Acting Ensign James Brown in command.

== Service ==
Assigned to the North Atlantic Blockading Squadron, on 25 July Hero was renamed Moccasin. She acted as guard boat off Fort Delaware until 13 August when Moccasin joined tug Aster and Yantic in pursuit of blockade‑runner CSS Tallahassee. The two tugs cruised as far north as Nantucket Island, Massachusetts., before returning to Philadelphia 19 August. Moccasin resumed patrol off Fort Delaware into early 1865.

On 13 March 1865 Moccasin was ordered to St. Inigoes, Maryland, for duty with the Potomac Flotilla under Commander Foxhall A. Parker, Jr. Lee surrendered to Grant at Appomattox 9 April, but the news was slow in spreading. With half of the flotilla released from service in May, Moccasin continued operations in the Potomac River. On 30 July Wyandank took Moccasin in tow for Norfolk, Virginia where the tug debarked patients from the Washington, DC, naval hospital.

Upon return to Washington, Moccasin was decommissioned 12 August and sold 18 September 1865 to the Treasury Department for use as a revenue cutter.
