= Senator Huff =

Senator Huff may refer to:

- Bob Huff (born 1953), California State Senate
- Daniel W. Huff (1854–1940), Mississippi State Senate
- Gene Huff (1929–2011), Kentucky State Senate
- George F. Huff (1842–1912), Pennsylvania State Senate

== See also ==
- Senator Hough (disambiguation)
