= Bozrah Congregational Church and Parsonage =

Historic church in Connecticut

- U.S. National Register of Historic Places
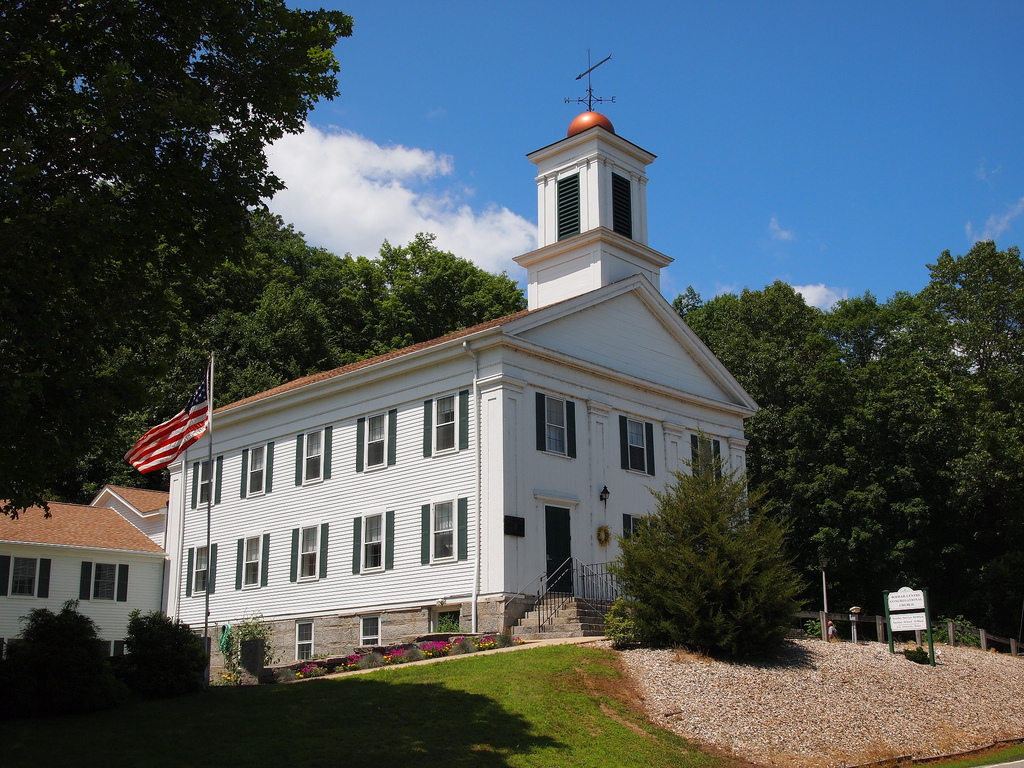

- Location within Connecticut Location within the United States
- Location: 17 and 23 Bozrah Street, Bozrah, Connecticut
- Coordinates: 41°33′24″N 72°9′56″W
- Area: 3 acres (1.2 ha)
- Built: 1843
- Built by: Baldwin, Lloyd E.; Rudd, Nathaniel
- Architectural style: Greek Revival, Italianate
- NRHP reference No.: 91000952
- Added to NRHP: July 26, 1991

Bozrah Congregational Church and Parsonage is a historic church and parsonage at 17 and 23 Bozrah Street in Bozrah, Connecticut, built in 1843. It is a well-preserved example of churches transitional between Federal period meeting house architecture and 19th-century Greek Revival church architecture. The property was added to the National Register of Historic Places in 1991.

== Architecture and history ==
The Bozrah Congregational Church is located near the village center of Bozrah on the west side of Bozrah Street overlooking Fitchville Pond. It is a rectangular 2 1/2-story wood-frame structure with a gabled roof and clapboarded exterior. Paneled pilasters rise at the building corners to an entablature that encircles the building, and the front-facing gable is fully pedimented. A two-stage bell tower is capped by a round cupola and weathervane. The front facade is three bays wide, articulated by pilasters, with entrances in each of the outer bays. The interior is simply finished with bench pews. The parsonage is a Victorian frame house built in 1872 and stands a few hundred feet to the south.

The church congregation was established in 1737, when the area was still part of Norwich. Its first meeting house was also used for civic affairs after the town was incorporated in 1786. In the early 1840s, the congregation debated repairing or replacing its old meeting house, eventually deciding to construct this building, which was completed in 1843. Architecturally, it follows in the tradition of older meeting houses in its form and interior, although with Greek Revival style popular at the time.

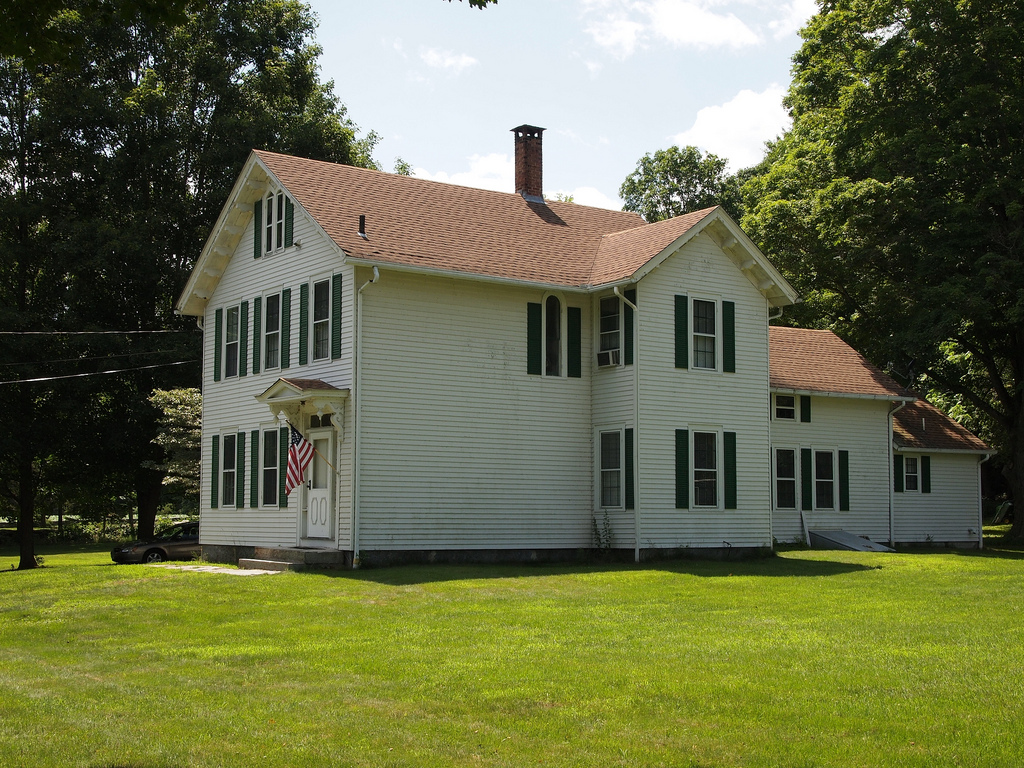
The parsonage (1872)

== See also ==
- National Register of Historic Places listings in New London County, Connecticut
