= Gardner Lake State Park =

Park in New London County, Connecticut, United States of America

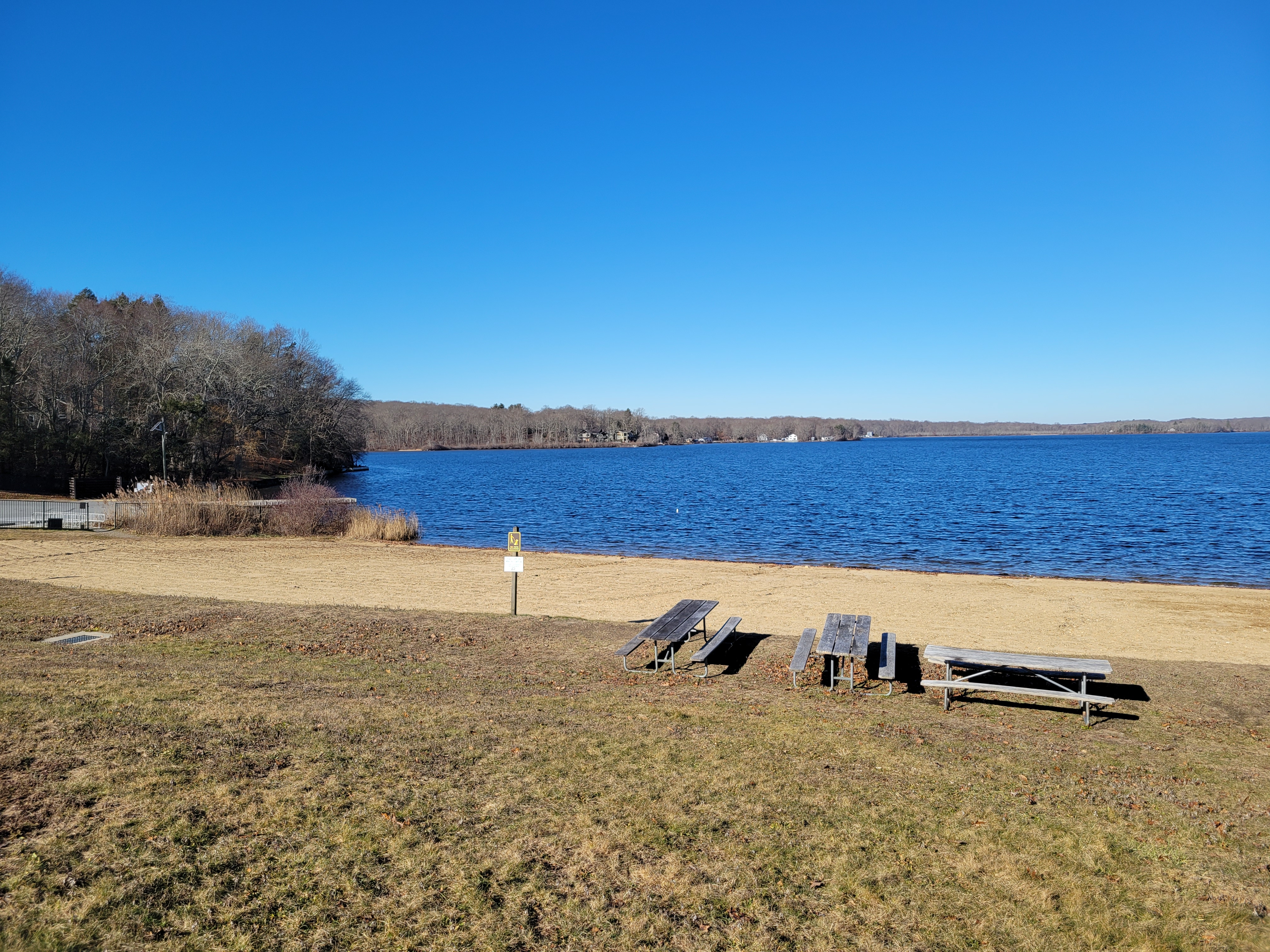
- Gardner Lake

- Location within Connecticut Location within the United States
- Location: Salem, Connecticut, United States
- Coordinates: 41°30′09″N 72°13′54″W
- Area: 10 acres (4.0 ha)
- Elevation: 377 ft (115 m)
- Established: 2001
- Administrator: Connecticut Department of Energy and Environmental Protection
- Designation: Connecticut state park
- Website: Official website

Gardner Lake State Park is a public recreation area occupying 10 acres (4.0 ha) on the southern edge of Gardner Lake in the town of Salem, Connecticut. The state park offers opportunities for boating, fishing, and swimming and is managed by the Connecticut Department of Energy and Environmental Protection.

== History ==
For most of the 20th century, the site of the state park was a private resort. The state purchased the site in 2001 for $550,000 after previous efforts to purchase it in the 1990s by local government were rejected by voters. In 2008, the state invested $1 million in improvements to the park's boat launch and parking area. Those improved facilities contributed to a marked upturn in public use.

== Activities and amenities ==
The park offers a swimming beach and boat launch. Gardner Lake covers 529 acres (214 ha) and is a state-designated bass management lake.

== In the news ==
In 2012, 2013, and 2016, reports of disruptive behavior and visitors' failure to pack out trash led to calls for increased vigilance by authorities and more cooperation from the public.
