= Gardner Lake =

Natural lake in Connecticut

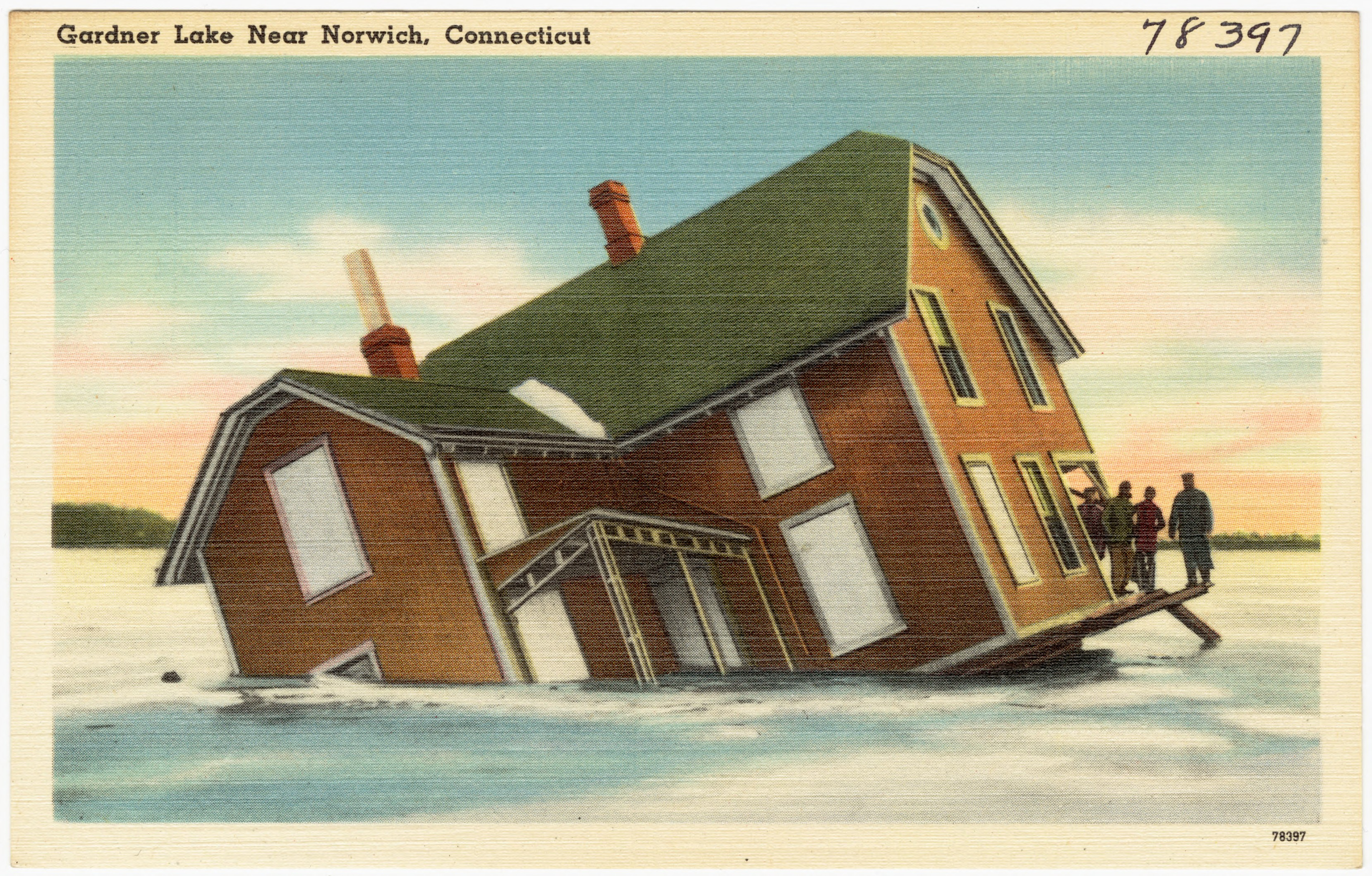
- Postcard illustration of Gardner Lake's iconic sinking house

- Location in Connecticut
- Location: Salem, Montville and Bozrah, Connecticut.
- Coordinates: 41°30′44″N 72°13′36″W
- Lake type: Natural lake
- Primary inflows: Whittle Brook, Sucker Brook
- Primary outflows: Gardner Brook
- Basin countries: United States
- Max. length: 1.68 miles (2.70 km)
- Max. width: 3,776 feet (1,151 m)
- Surface area: 529 acres (214 ha)
- Average depth: 18 feet (5.5 m)
- Max. depth: 36 feet (11 m)
- Residence time: 320 days
- Surface elevation: 381 feet (116 m)
- Islands: 1 (Minnie Island)

Gardner Lake is a natural lake lying at the junction of the towns of Salem, Montville and Bozrah in the U.S. state of Connecticut. Named after the Gardner family who owned a large portion of the surrounding land, the 529-acre (214 ha) lake has been expanded in size with the construction of a 168-foot (51 m) earthen dam. The dam raises the water level up 4 feet (1.2 m) to an average depth of 14 feet (4.3 m). The area surrounding Gardner Lake has dozens of private homes, four campgrounds and a marina. Three state parks are located around the lake: Minnie Island State Park, Hopemead State Park and Gardner Lake State Park.

== History ==
Gardner Lake is a natural lake and is named for the Gardner family which owned a large portion of the surrounding area, but the history of the lake itself is more identified as the site of "an extremely public miscalculation". Thomas LeCount, a grocer from Niantic, Connecticut, wanted to move his two-story summer house from the south side to the east side of the lake, but believed that moving the house conventionally would be inefficient. LeCount raised up his fully furnished house and placed it on sleds and waited until February 1895 when the lake was frozen. After being moved about 300 feet (91 m) off the south shore, the house slid sideways into a snowbank. The ice cracked as he attempted to pull it back, before he abandoned the work at nightfall. That night, the mill operators utilized some of the lake's water for power and made a gap between the ice and surface of the water, causing the house to crack through the ice and pitch over.

LeCount's summer home remained in this position until the spring thaw where it came to rest in 15 feet (4.6 m) of water with the second story and attic positioned above the water like a small lighthouse. For years, the house was the preserve of children who fished from it in summer and ice skated through it in the winter, but an enduring tale told by fishermen is that its piano could be heard playing on quiet nights.

By 2005, the house was mostly rotted away.

== State parks ==
Gardner Lake State Park

Gardner Lake State Park is a small 9.75-acre (3.95 ha) Connecticut state park located on the south portion of the lake and provides access for fishing, swimming, and boating on the lake. Added to the state park list in 2001, it expected to be open around 2002 and serves as one of the few public inland swimming areas in the New London County area.

In 2001, the State of Connecticut paid $550,000 to acquire the parcel of land which became Lake Gardner State Park. The land was acquired from the estate of Carmine Belardo and returned a beach to public service that had been a private resort for 60 years. The Town of Salem had sought to acquire the land, but the citizens rejected the plan three times and a state funded grant was rejected in 1994 after the DEP announced the interest in acquiring the property for the state. In 2008, the state spent about $1 million to pave the boat launch area and improve parking for 54 vehicles. In 2012, the State of Connecticut was looking to institute parking fees for the park after it experienced several years of increased attendance and incidents in the park limits. Concerns included littering, unkempt toilets, swimmers going outside the designated zone and police arresting almost three times as many visitors from 2011. In response to the issues, patrols were increased and additional signage was added to inform swimmers. The problems with trash and portable toilets ending up in the lake caused concerns for a local advocacy group, Friends of Gardner Lake, and the Gardner Lake Authority which has staff to attend the lake during peak hours.

Gardner Lake State Park is located off Connecticut Route 354 and has accessible parking, chemical toilets and a paved boat launch area. This state park designated area is primarily to provide boating and recreational access to the lake, though there is also a small beach for visitors to use. As of 2014, the park does not have a parking fee.

Minnie Island State Park

Minnie Island State Park is a pine grown-knoll that is located in the deepest portion of the lake. It is an unmarked and undeveloped island that also is Connecticut's smallest state park at 0.88 acres. The island acquired its name when a local man declared it to be Minnie Island, because he took his wife, Minnie, to it for picnics. Joseph Leary, author of A Shared Landscape, writes, "[a]s far back as anyone can remember, the island was a frequent landing place for boating parties and a great place for local children to explore." The island was claimed by both the towns of Salem, Connecticut, and Montville, Connecticut, though it was not in the land records of either town. This went unnoticed until a man attempted to purchase the island, and then made attempted to establish claim to the island. The man introduced a bill to authorize the sale by the state to establish title to the island, but instead the Connecticut General Assembly drafted and passed a bill to turn the island into a park.

Minnie Island State Park offers opportunities for picnicking and fishing to visitors who visit it. Though the Connecticut Department of Energy and Environmental Protection lists boating as an activity, this recommendation is redundant given that the island is only accessible by boat. The Oh, Ranger! website advises visitors to the tiny island to use a kayak to access it because the it is heavily wooded and difficult to find a spot to dock.

Hopemead State Park

Hopemead State Park is currently undeveloped 70 acre park on the eastern shore of the lake. The land was originally Solomon Gardner's farm until it was purchased as a summer getaway by the Fuller family. The property was named Camp Charmarlou, an acronym from Fuller's three daughters, and contained a house and an artist's studio. Camp Charmarlou was used a boys camp for a number of years with permission by the Fuller family. It was later renamed Hopemead, literally "Hope Meadow", by the Fuller daughters who believed it to be a sanctuary with spiritual overtones. In 1954, the land was donated to the State of Connecticut to become a state park. The state found the land is unsuitable for development and demolished the dilapidated buildings, with the intention of letting Hopemead return to a natural state. Joseph Leary notes that the wildlife has thrived in the area, but notes that the cacophony of noises and calls is simply "divine". The park offers opportunities for hiking and fishing.

== Activities ==
The Connecticut Department of Environmental Protection, now the Connecticut Department of Energy and Environmental Protection has been stocking the lake with walleye since 1993. The walleye populations have been reported to be growing and they join the lake's "excellent populations of bull head and catfish". Smallmouth bass, largemouth bass, yellow perch are also found, but have been reported as "fair" reports and also good reports for trout. Local fishing tournaments also occur at Gardner Lake. As a result of the improvements to the boat launch area, boating and kayaking have increased greatly and police had to up the patrols at the lake. The area is patrolled by the Montville police and it costs the majority of annual budget, but the service was seen as beneficial to ensure the safety of boaters and enforcing the rules.
