= Commonwealth Works Site =

Archaeological site in Connecticut

- U.S. National Register of Historic Places
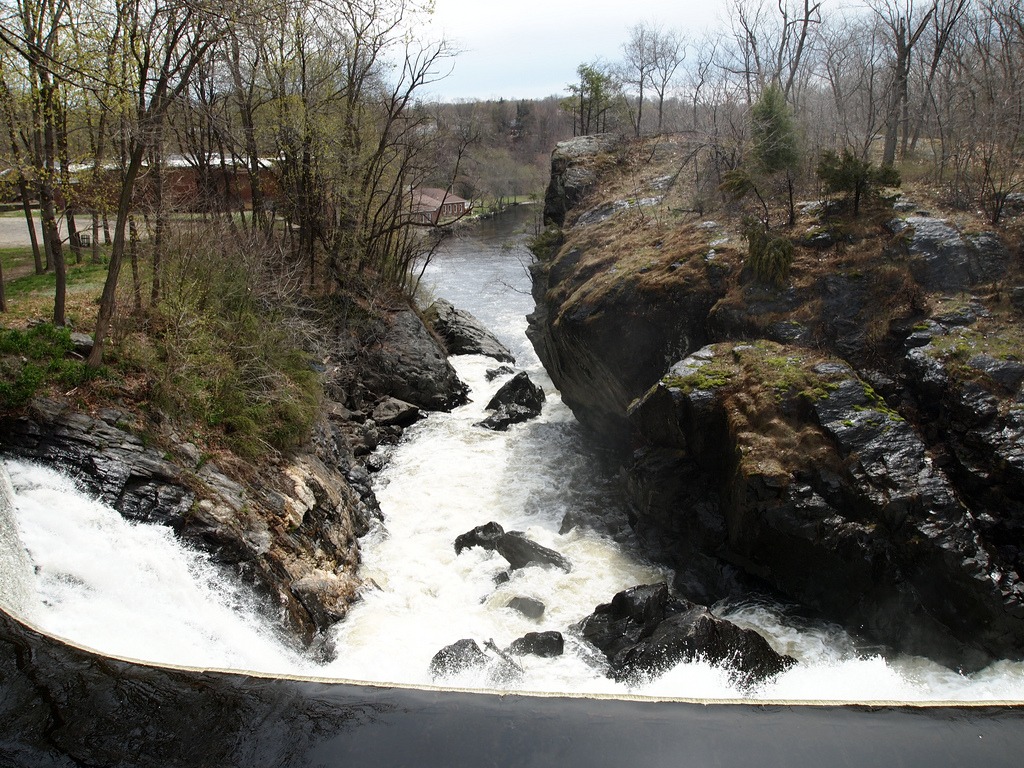
- Yantic Falls
- Location: Norwich, Connecticut
- Area: less than one acre
- NRHP reference No.: 98000360
- Added to NRHP: April 13, 1998

The Commonwealth Works Site is a historic industrial archaeological site in Norwich, Connecticut, located near the Yantic Falls on the Yantic River. It was the site of a major industrial facility developed in the mid-19th century, with an industrial history dating back to the 18th century. Charles Augustus Converse had consolidated water rights at the falls, and built a large complex which housed a number of different water-powered enterprises, including the gun factory of Ethan Allen, a gristmill, sawmill, woolen mill, nail factory, and a cork-cutting factory.

The site was listed on the National Register of Historic Places in 1998.

== See also ==
- National Register of Historic Places listings in New London County, Connecticut
