= USS Yantic =

American Civil War gunboat

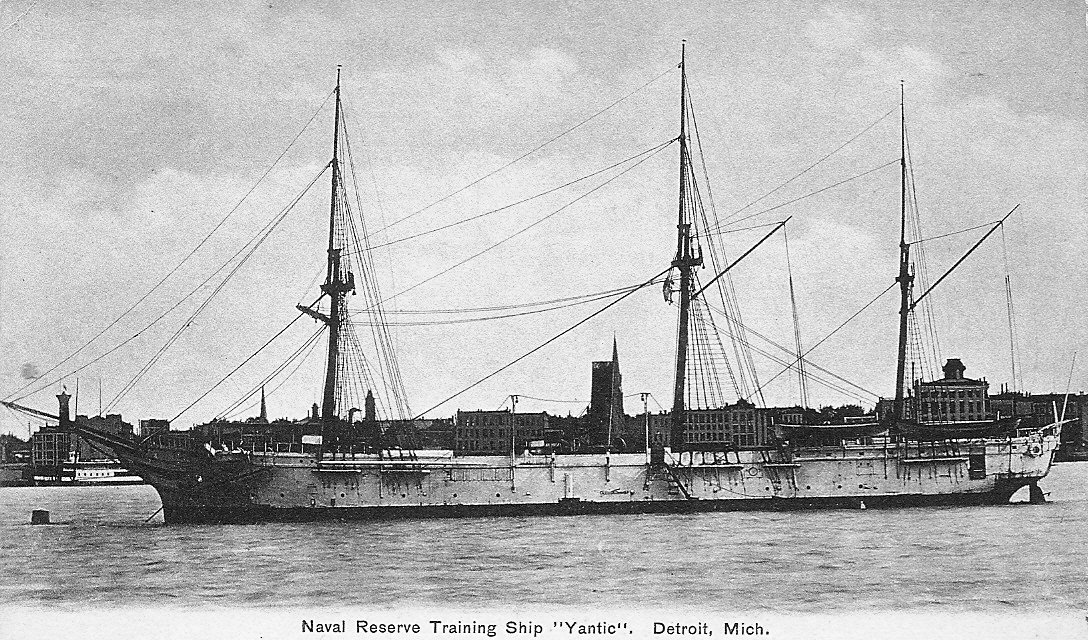
- USS Yantic

History

United States
- Name: USS Yantic
- Namesake: Yantic River, CT
- Builder: Philadelphia Navy Yard
- Launched: 19 March 1864
- Commissioned: 12 August 1864
- Reclassified: IX-32, 15 May 1921
- Stricken: 9 May 1930
- Fate: Sunk, 22 October 1929

General characteristics
- Type: Gunboat
- Displacement: 836 long tons (849 t)
- Length: 179 ft (55 m) p/p
- Beam: 30 ft (9.1 m)
- Draft: 13 ft 9 in (4.19 m)
- Speed: 9.5 knots (17.6 km/h; 10.9 mph)
- Complement: 154
- Armament: 1 × 100-pounder Parrott rifle; 1 × 30-pounder Parrott rifle; 2 × 9 in (230 mm) smoothbore Dahlgren guns; 2 × 24-pounder howitzers; 1 × 12-pounder guns

USS Yantic (IX-32), a wooden-hulled screw gunboat built at the Philadelphia Navy Yard, was launched on 19 March 1864 and commissioned on 12 August 1864, Lieutenant Commander Thomas C. Harris in command. She was named after the Yantic River.

== Service history ==
=== Civil War, 1864–1865 ===
The day after her commissioning, 13 August 1864, Yantic – in company with the tugs USS Aster and USS Moccasin – sailed in pursuit of the Confederate privateer CSS Tallahassee. The gunboat went to the northward and eastward of Nantucket during her cruise but, as her commanding officer reported, "obtained no information to justify a longer search for the piratical vessel." Consequently, after a week at sea, Yantic returned to the Philadelphia Navy Yard and commenced her post-trial repairs.

Meanwhile, CSS Tallahassee had left Halifax, Nova Scotia, at 13:00 on 20 August, before any Federal warships could arrive, setting in motion a search. Agitation in Washington over Tallahassee resulted in Secretary of the Navy Gideon Welles' sending identical telegrams to the commandants of the navy yards at New York and Philadelphia on the 20th, asking each what vessels were ready for sea.

Yantic subsequently received orders directing her to proceed to Woods Hole, Massachusetts, where she was to await further orders. She arrived there at 10:00 on 13 September. Yantic later operated off the eastern seaboard between Hampton Roads and New York and, on 1 November, visited Halifax – a port swarming with "secessionists and other sympathizers" – to obtain information on the activities of CSS Olustee (as the Confederates had renamed Tallahassee).

After the Confederate ship had managed to elude her pursuers, Yantic joined the North Atlantic Blockading Squadron off Wilmington, North Carolina. During the Union's first attempt to take Fort Fisher, N.C., on Christmas Eve 1864, the screw gunboat suffered her first casualties. At 15:00 that afternoon, during the bombardment phase of the action, the ship's 100-pounder rifled gun burst, mortally wounding the division officer, the gun captain, and four men. On his own initiative, Commander Harris – thinking his ship "badly shattered" and not knowing the extent of the damage – ordered his ship hauled out of line. After obtaining medical assistance from the steamer USS Fort Jackson and reporting the assessed damage to the flagship USS Malvern, Harris took Yantic back into action, opening fire with his remaining effective guns, the 30-pounder rifle and a 9-inch Dahlgren gun.

On Christmas Day 1864, Yantic assisted in the debarking of the troops of General Benjamin Butler and covered the landing operations. At 1400, on the 25th, as Lieutenant Commander Harris later reported, the troops landed "amidst deafening and encouraging cheers from the men-of-war and from the troops still aboard the transports, cheers which were echoed by the fleet by a fire that elicited but a feeble response from the fort." General Butler, however, "to the surprise and mortification of all" (as Harris later recounted), recalled the troops; and the landing operation ceased.

The first Union attempt to reduce and take Fort Fisher thus proved to be a dismal failure; but, before another attempt was made, General Butler was replaced by a more dynamic and aggressive man, Major General Alfred Terry. Yantic provided a landing party and gunfire support for the second amphibious attack that commenced on 13 January 1865. In the action – a bloody one in which the sailors and marines of the naval landing force charged on the run into withering Confederate gunfire and suffered accordingly grievous casualties in the frontal assault – Fort Fisher was finally taken on 15 January. During the battle, Yantic lost three men – two on 15 January and one, who had been wounded mortally on the 15th, who died on the 20th.

The next month, Yantic participated in the capture of Fort Anderson, N.C., between 17 and 19 February, in her second major landing operation in a little over a month. For the remainder of the Civil War, Yantic served on blockade duties, as part of the successful Union interdiction operation, preventing trade by sea with the Confederacy.

=== 1865–1882 ===
For a little over three more decades, Yantic "showed the flag" of the United States in the West Indies, in South American waters, and in the Far East – as well as along the eastern seaboard of the United States. After operating fairly close to home from 1865 to 1872, she then cruised to the Asiatic Station, where she operated for the next four years, 1873 to 1877.

During that particular tour of duty, Yantic stood ready to provide assistance for Americans and protection for their property. While operating with the Asiatic Squadron – precursor of the Asiatic Fleet and the 7th Fleet – the gunboat put ashore her landing force at Shanghai, China, on 3 May 1874, in company with the landing party from the sidewheeler USS Ashuelot to aid in quelling a riot by the local natives.

At other times during that Asiatic Squadron deployment, Yantic conducted a regular routine of cruises to ports ranging from Canton, Borneo, the Philippine Islands, and Hong Kong. In late 1874, when the Pacific Mail Steamer Japan foundered, Yantic searched for her. In the spring of 1875, the gunboat later protected the salvagers of Japan's cargo from pirates. Subsequently, Yantic's crew took part in celebrations attending the unveiling of the statue of Admiral David G. Farragut in Washington, D.C., on 25 April 1881, before sailing later that spring to Mexican waters. In June, at Progreso, Yucatán, she investigated the detention of the American bark Acacia before returning northward to familiar waters off the eastern seaboard of the United States. In October 1881, Yantic also took part in observances commemorating the centennial of the Battle of Groton Heights and in festivities celebrating the centennial of the American victory at Yorktown, Virginia.

=== 1883–1917 ===
In June 1883, Yantic headed for the coast of Greenland, Comdr. Frank Wildes in command, as tender for the steamer Proteus, the latter carrying the men of the second relief party sent out to search for the exploration party led by Lieutenant Adolphus Greely. After touching at Disco, Upernavik, and Littleton Island, Yantic returned to New York on 29 September 1883. She carried back with her the men of the relief party, led by Lieutenant Garlington, and also the officers and men of Proteus, which had been crushed in heavy ice on 23 July 1883. Unfortunately, neither ship found any trace of the ill-fated Greely expedition.

Yantic "showed the flag" along the eastern seaboard and into the waters of South America and the West Indies from 1884 to 1897. In 1891, using explosives, she cleared wreck obstructions caused by a two ship collision off Barnegat Light, New Jersey. In 1898, she was then loaned to the naval militia of the state of Michigan and served as training ship on the Great Lakes until 1917.

=== Training ship, 1917–1929 ===
With America's entry into World War I, the navy expanded. Accordingly, the Civil War gunboat was recommissioned in 1917 and assigned as a training ship at the Naval Training Station, Great Lakes, Illinois. After the armistice, she was struck from the Navy List on 24 July 1919 and ordered sold. However, the venerable Yantic was withdrawn from the sale list on 31 December of the same year and again assigned duty as a training ship – this time with the Naval Reserve Forces of the 9th, 10th, and 11th Naval Districts. Commissioned on 15 May 1921, Yantic – designated IX-32 – operated out of Cleveland, Ohio, until 30 June 1926, when she was decommissioned and again loaned to the state of Michigan.

Yantic suddenly sank alongside the dock at the foot of Townsend Avenue, Detroit, Michigan, on 22 October 1929. Subsequent investigation revealed that the sinking had been caused by structural weakening, owing to "natural deterioration." Her hull is still buried in a filled-in boat slip in Gabriel Richard Park; her anchor sits in front of the Detroit Naval Armory. She was struck from the Navy List on 9 May 1930. The ship log is nowhere to be found.

== See also ==
- Union Navy
- Union Blockade
