= Neighborhoods of Norwich, Connecticut =

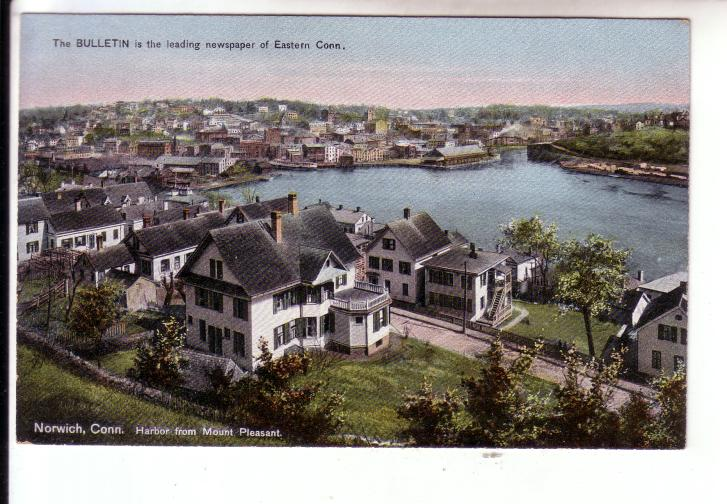
Harbor view, 1909

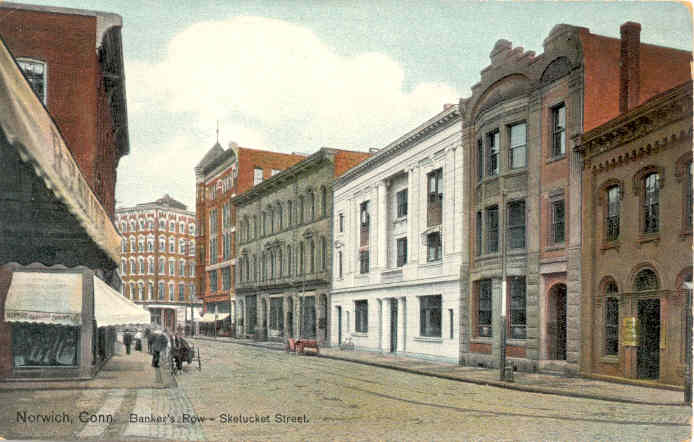
Shetucket Street, 1909

Several neighborhoods of Norwich, Connecticut maintain independent identities and are recognized by official signs marking their boundaries. The following is a list of neighborhoods in Norwich.

== Bean Hill ==
Bean Hill was originally a separate village, located about a mile from the center of Norwich in close proximity to the Norwichtown Green. It was founded by a group of Episcopalians around a small green (now a public park). In the early 19th century it was the site of the Norwich Methodist Episcopal Church, which met in a building that also housed a classical academy and a free school. The African American abolitionist David Ruggles grew up in Bean Hill and had an Underground Railroad stop in this area in one of the houses. Several of the old colonial houses and the Methodist church building (now a photographic and investment business) still stand. Modern Bean Hill grew in all directions with the coming of a highway on and off ramp depositing into the area just below the green. This area is now commercial with numerous gas stations, a Courtyard Marriott and a park and ride. Extending out from the Green are more commercial establishments, small shopping centers and, to the northeast, residential neighborhoods. The copper company Phelps Dodge is located in the farther reaches of Bean Hill next to old mills.

== Chelsea or Downtown ==
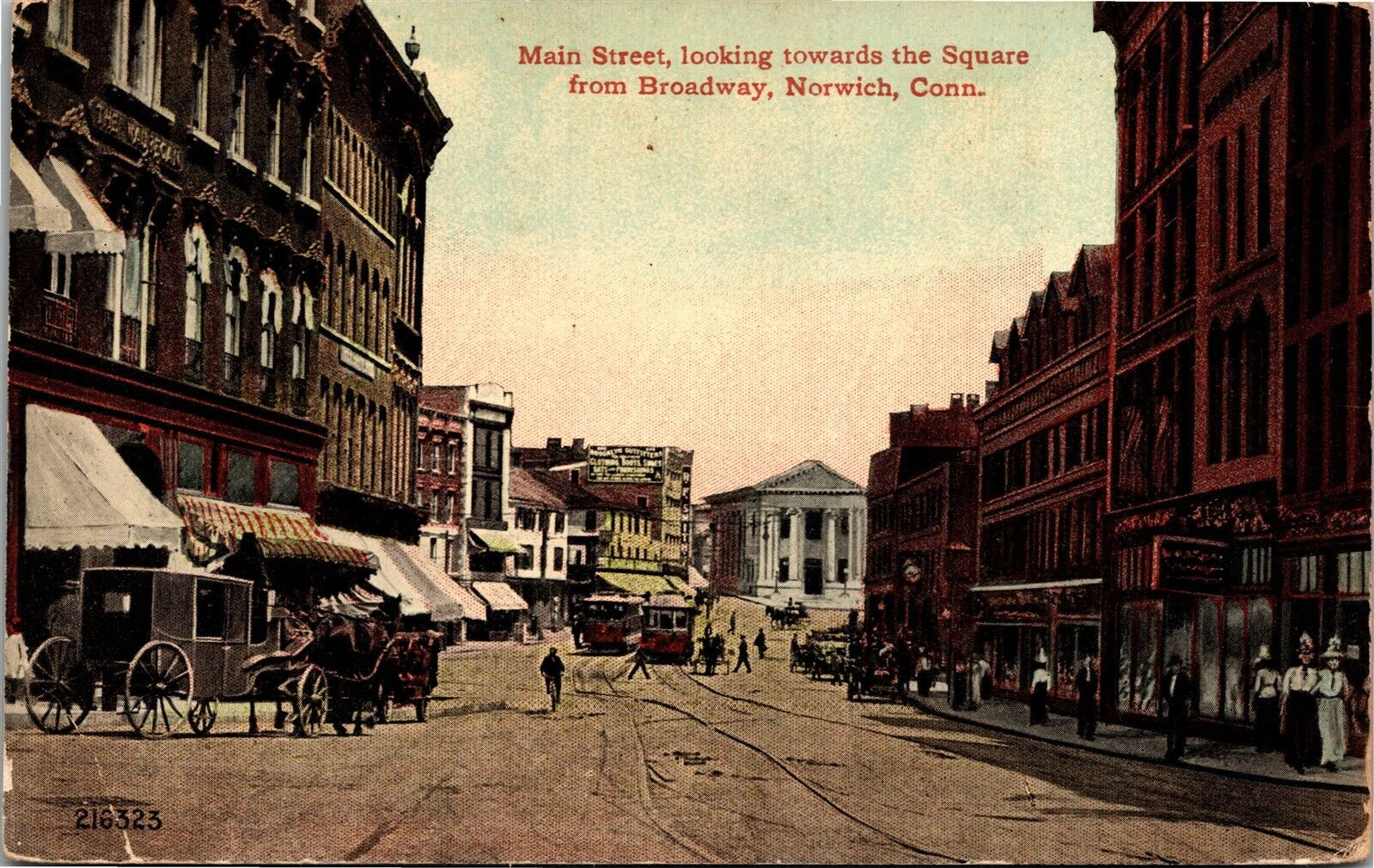
Looking down Main Street, from Broadway, towards the Square, from a 1916 postcard

Because of its location at the Y-fork of the Thames, Shetucket and Yantic Rivers, Chelsea became the home of the city's former shipping harbor located on Hollyhock Island. Because of Norwich's industrial and commercial nature, this neighborhood is quite large, with its borders extending from Washington Street in the west to Burnham Square in the east.

At the core of Norwich's downtown are the harbor and a dense grouping of 18th-century buildings that are still mostly intact. The majority of big businesses, now lost, @Main Street/Franklin Street/Shetucket Street/Broadway, three still extant as Shannon Corner, the Wauregan Hotel, and nearby Reid and Hughes department store; marketed under (The Boston Store); which were both restored to original period 19th-Century appearance and readapted for residential use in 2005 and 2025 respectively; while Sears, and Woolworth's closings, and Chelsea Groton Bank- which was still operational as of 2025, and on its high-perched triangular cornerstone Lot overseeing the Square, were also developed around that "Centennial Square" before moving out of the city or to East Great Plain with the economic tide. Also, at this writing, Water Street Lofts, also in a former retail store on Water Street, and Thames Plaza Landing across the street are both being adapted into modern use for numerous residential units or lofts. Numerous churches and historic homes, the former YMCA (it also being redeveloped into Pub House and/or Restaurant use and Mattern Construction offices) of Southeastern Connecticut and Post Office are also in and around Chelsea. The old train station and tracks are located here also, along with the city's grand Second Empire-style (1870-73) City Hall, New London County Superior Court, CLA Engineers and the Otis Library. The oldest remaining building in the city, Chelsea Landing Pub, "Strange Brew", is located here as well. The main public areas in this district are Centennial (aka Franklin) Square, City Hall (aka Union) Square and Howard T. Brown Memorial Park. The offices of the Norwich Bulletin were formerly located in the once-busy historic railroad station, most recently the site of the St. Vincent De Paul soup kitchen. The newspaper's previous longtime location, the Sunshine Building and the main newspaper building on Franklin Street in the north, just below the AT&T offices next to City Hall, is now home to an eclectic Coffee Shop and other retailers, including a Brewery/Tasting Hall, and a business incubator. The original Otis Library, (now LaStella Restaurant) was in a small brick building across the square from City Hall. In 2007 it was reimagined and updated from its previous incarnation into a new Mission-style building still on Main Street that incorporates its previous and adjacent locations.

Chelsea/Downtown declined greatly after the city's manufacturing businesses moved overseas and downstate after shipping moved to New London. Most businesses went defunct or became rundown, including the Wauregan Hotel and the defunct Reid and Hughes. Many of the now-vacant buildings quickly fell into disrepair. The area was renamed the Chelsea Arts District for the theaters—the Donald L. Oat (run by the Norwich Arts Council) and the Spirit of Broadway—and small galleries, including The Gallery at Wauregan, that have been pioneers in trying to revive the downtown. Numerous buildings have received renowned Full Murals with highly recognizable artwork and creative hues throughout the Chelsea District, with an addition in (2025) of a new modernist sculpture in Franklin Square denoting Norwich's rich manufacturing history and the diverse peoples who made it possible. Lit in a purplish hue at night, it brings a refreshing spirit to the Square. Many pocket parks and musical amphitheaters are planned in the near future. Hollyhock Island became home to a pleasure craft marina on the south end and a decaying industrial zone with a sewage treatment plant on the north end.

Several important buildings in downtown have been renovated, specifically the Wauregan Hotel, Reid and Hughes, Water Street Lofts, and the former Chelsea Landing, and Otis Library. Although not completely salvaged, Hollyhock Island was freed of the abandoned Duffy Mill complex. In 2012 a $22 million Intermodal Transportation Center was dedicated on Hollyhock Island. As of March 2015, the building remains mostly vacant except for serving as a turnaround for the region's Southeast Area Transit Authority (SEAT) buses. The harbor area and Howard T. Brown Park are popular for summertime music concerts and various annual festivals, including the Taste of Italy (Labor Day weekend), Juneteenth, and the Rotary Club of Norwich's summer carnival

== East Great Plains (or Westside) ==
Named from at least 1890, this section of Norwich is located in the southwest part of the city and is centered around the junction of New London Turnpike and Route 82. Three Rivers Community College, the Norwich Rose Garden Ice Rink and the Norwich Public Golf Course are located in East Great Plains. Stanton Elementary School is located in East Great Plains next to the second of Norwich's synagogues, Beth Jacob.

== East Side ==
On the Shetucket River and hills just northeast of Laurel Hill, this is a largely ethnic neighborhood on East Main Street and Hamilton Avenue. When first occupied, this district was dominated by Italian immigrants and later Poles. Haitians, Hispanics and most recently Asians have made this neighborhood their home. Anglo Saxon families have integrated the neighborhood as well, providing for a true melting pot. The area has not lost its ethnic character, as new Asian grocery stores open up alongside old Italian shops.

Before water services were extended across the Shetucket, the East Side was watered by a spring up in the hills above Talman Street. The water would flow down and be collected by families at a communal fountain. Recently in a local ceremony, the fountain was reestablished in a small flowered alcove underneath a parking lot. This landmark of the East Side is observable from the intersection of Talman Street and East Main Street where it comes off the Preston Bridge.

The Thames River Academy is located on the East Side.

== Greeneville ==
The Greeneville section of Norwich Connecticut was named by William Greene. In 1826, Greene purchased land on both sides of the Shetucket River to develop. In 1828, he transferred the land to the Norwich Water Power Company, in which he was the largest shareholder. Norwich Water Power Company began construction on a dam in 1829. By 1833, the dam and canals were finished and capable of providing water power to 40,000 to 50,000 spindles. Mills were quickly built along the Shetucket River during the mid-19th century to take advantage of this water power. The remains of the original dam may still be seen upstream of the present dam.

Greeneville was originally settled by Irish immigrants who established St. Mary's Church in 1845, making it the oldest Catholic church in eastern Connecticut. The original structure still exists as Savage Hardware Store. The current church, completed in 1867, is located on Central Avenue. While originally Irish, it now also serves growing Hispanic and Haitian populations, regularly offering masses in Spanish and Creole.

The Greeneville Dam Fishing Area provides fishing and boating access to the Shetucket River at the site of a fish ladder and dam operated by Norwich Public Utilities.

Greeneville's Neighborhood Revitalization Zone committee is active in keeping the Greeneville section friendly for families and small businesses.

== Jail Hill ==
Located just above downtown, this district once featured a hilltop prison, and below it on Court Street and Church was the original City Hall from (1829) where Abraham Lincoln gave his famous "Norwich" speech when passing through on his 1860 campaign. This City Hall burned in (1865) and was replaced with the 2nd Empire style building on Union Sq.in (1873). "Jail Hill" is now a quiet residential area with winding streets and view of the rest of the city and also a stop on Norwich's Freedom Trail.

== Laurel Hill ==
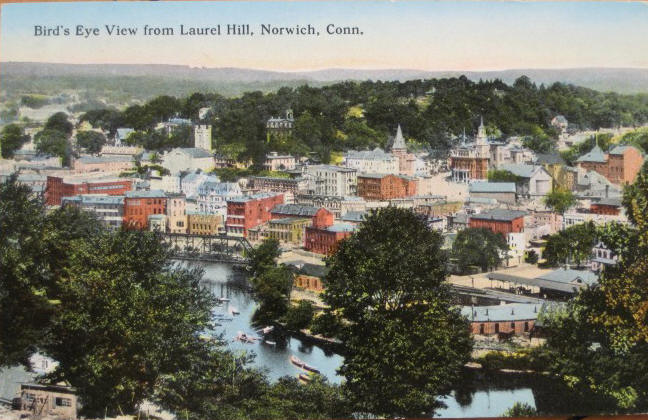
View from Laurel Hill, about 1916

On the opposite side of the river from Thamesville is Laurel Hill. It is also predominantly residential with most businesses and organization buildings located on Route 12. Its very riverfront contains old warehouses, a condemned trainyard and a cleared landfill. The former Thermos Corporation operated a plant here, the building of which has been converted into the Integrated Day Charter School. The Norwich portion of the now-defunct Norwich State Hospital is located on the very south end of Laurel Hill along with an abandoned planned community that is considered part of the former psychiatric hospital.

There is also an apartment community right before the abandoned hospital called Thames View Apartments. Adjacent to the apartment complex is the Laurel Hill Volunteer Fire Department.

Veterans' Memorial Elementary School and the former Laurel Hill Neighborhood School make up this neighborhood's educational dimensions.

== Norwichtown ==
Located in north central Norwich, Norwichtown is the old town of Norwich, where the town's founders first settled. The Norwichtown Green is surrounded by many historic houses and shops (now converted into law practices, nursing homes or bed and breakfasts) such as the John Mason School (now the central administration for the Norwich Public School System) and First Congregational Church. The neighborhood includes the Norwichtown Historic District.

== Occum ==
Named after Samson Occom, this was another mill town that was later incorporated into Norwich. Like Greeneville, it is located on the Shetucket River. The old mill have since been demolished. Occum contains a small business center with a fire station and public park. The rest is devoted to residential housing and churches extending into Baltic.

== Ox Hill ==
Located just to the northeast of Washington Street and Broadway, Ox Hill is predominantly residential and recreational. The Norwich Vocational Technical High School is located at the former Mohegan Campus of Three Rivers Community (January 2009), the Mohegan Campus having merged with the Thames Valley campus. Thomas J. Kelly Junior High School is located next to the vocational high school campus. Across the road from Kelly are sports fields, courts and parks used by the Norwich Recreation Department. The Rose City Senior Center and three broadcast towers are located up here as well. The rest of the area is residential in nature with connections to Norwichtown. Mohegan Park is also located on Ox Hill.

== Plain Hill ==
This gently sloping hill is located on the outskirts of Norwich, just above Bean Hill. It extends all the way up to the Sprague border. The area is entirely residential and very rural, with one main route (Plain Hill Road) connecting to side streets. Houses are few and far between in the more forested areas, while cleared areas host several homes and a radio tower. Side streets lead off into smaller subdivisions.

Wilcox Pond, and Bog Meadow Reservoirs, two of the city's backup reservoirs, are located on Plain Hill.

The city's meetinghouse for the Church of Jesus Christ of Latter-day Saints is located on Plain Hill near the Sprague border.

== Taftville ==
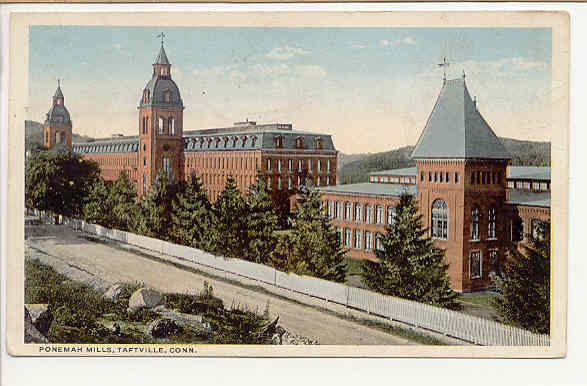
Ponemah Mills, about 1918

Named after the founder of the large textile mill in 1866, Taftville is north of Greeneville and west of the Shetucket River. Since the 19th century, Taftville has been the center of Norwich's French-Canadian population. Sacred Heart Church, located on the village's main street (Providence Street), for years celebrated the Catholic Mass in French.

== Thamesville ==
Taking its name from the Thames River, this predominantly residential neighborhood overlooks Chelsea, Laurel Hill, the Marina (former port of Norwich), and Thames and Yantic Rivers. Hosting small riverside businesses, this neighborhood intermixes local commerce and residential properties along Route 32 and the areas inland (West)to East Great Plains. The Norwich Police Department and City Fire Department cap off its northernmost point, and provide immediate response to this and many of the surrounding areas. Home to the American Ambulance headquarters and another office building designed by Richard Sharpe and Associates, Thamesville brings new air to the traditional architecture that dominated the area.

The Spa at Norwich Inn is located in the southern portion of Thamesville, and is within walking distance or a short drive to the Mohegan Sun Casino Resort, located further south on Route 32. Thamesville itself is well within walking distance to most of the night-life of Chelsea also, but offers many venues of its own. The Basement Cafe, Fat Cat's, and Engine No. 6 are places the locals eat and relax. Next to the Uncasville border, a string of car dealerships has earned this portion of Route 32 the nickname, "The Auto Mall". The area's Shipping Street, site of the former Lehigh Oil Company complex, is one of Norwich's numerous blighted, abandoned manufacturing districts. Unfortunately it is the first view of Norwich from the Thames River traveling north from New London.

Thamesville is a still developing neighborhood within Norwich. Formerly farmland (inland) and warehouse storage and factory sites (along the rivers), this area began to shift to predominately residential zones during the early- to mid-19th century, but offers many sites still available for development. Most of the homes in this area are single-family, with remodeled homes, apartment complexes, and condominiums filling the remainder this neighborhood.

== Union Street and City Hall Square ==
This is the in-between zone between Chelsea and Washington Street and Broadway. It contains two historic congregations (American Baptist and UCC) on City Hall Square, several city offices and numerous houses stretching up the hill towards Little Plains Park. The City Hall Square portion was originally known as Union Square.

== Washington Street and Broadway ==
This is the neighborhood between Chelsea and Norwichtown that stretches down the length of Washington Street and Broadway. During the city's economic booms during the Civil War and Reconstruction Period, this district became the playground of the rich. Numerous mansions, many of which still stand today, line Washington Street and Broadway while smaller houses exist behind them on side streets. Like Chelsea, during the economic slump Washington Street and Broadway also declined. The millionaires left and most of the mansions fell into states of disrepair. Recently, an effort has been undertaken to spruce up the neighborhood. Many of the mansions have been repaired and some converted to apartment spaces.

The largest structure in the city, Saint Patrick's Cathedral, stands at the intersection of Broadway and Union Street just above Little Plains Park. Built solely by the Irish immigrants to the city with dimes and wages, Saint Patrick's is a solid stone Roman Catholic cathedral, whose main steeple is the tallest structure in the city. The seat of the Roman Catholic Diocese of Norwich, Saint Patrick's property extends to the Chancery, Offices and Saint Patrick's School in surrounding buildings. Monsignor King Park just across the street commemorates a former Monsignor of the cathedral. Other prominent churches in the neighborhood include Park Congregational Church.

The Norwich Free Academy is just north of Saint Patrick's on Broadway.

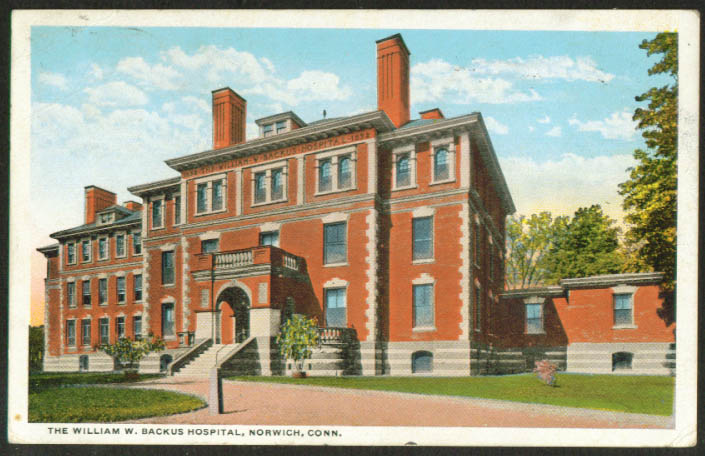
William W. Backus Hospital, about 1920

Chelsea Parade is the main park in Washington Street and Broadway. Containing a Civil War Memorial, the city time capsule and a flag pole, this area is mainly used as a war memorial and hosts the Memorial Day Parade and Remembrance Ceremonies. Columbus Park with a small obelisk dedicated to Christopher Columbus is located adjacent to the parade and across Crescent Street from the Norwich Free Academy. Across a small divider street from the tip of the parade is War Memorial Park, a small plot of land with memorials to veterans of foreign wars and POW-MIAs. Around Chelsea Parade is the Masonic Temple (since demolished in order to preserve an ancient Mohegan Indian burial ground), the Blackstone Apartments and smaller mansions. Up in the area of Sachem and Asylum Streets is Heritage Falls Park and Indian Leap, where an escaped Narragansett captive leaped over the Yantic Falls while fleeing from pursuing Mohegan Indians.

This district extends up to the Norwichtown welcome sign on Washington Street.

Between Norwichtown and the end of Washington Street lies the William W. Backus Hospital on 326 Washington street. Dedicated in 1893, Backus Hospital is named for William Wolcott Backus, a member of one of Norwich's oldest families who (along with William Albert Slater) led the effort to build it. Today, Backus is the city’s largest non-government employer.

== Yantic ==
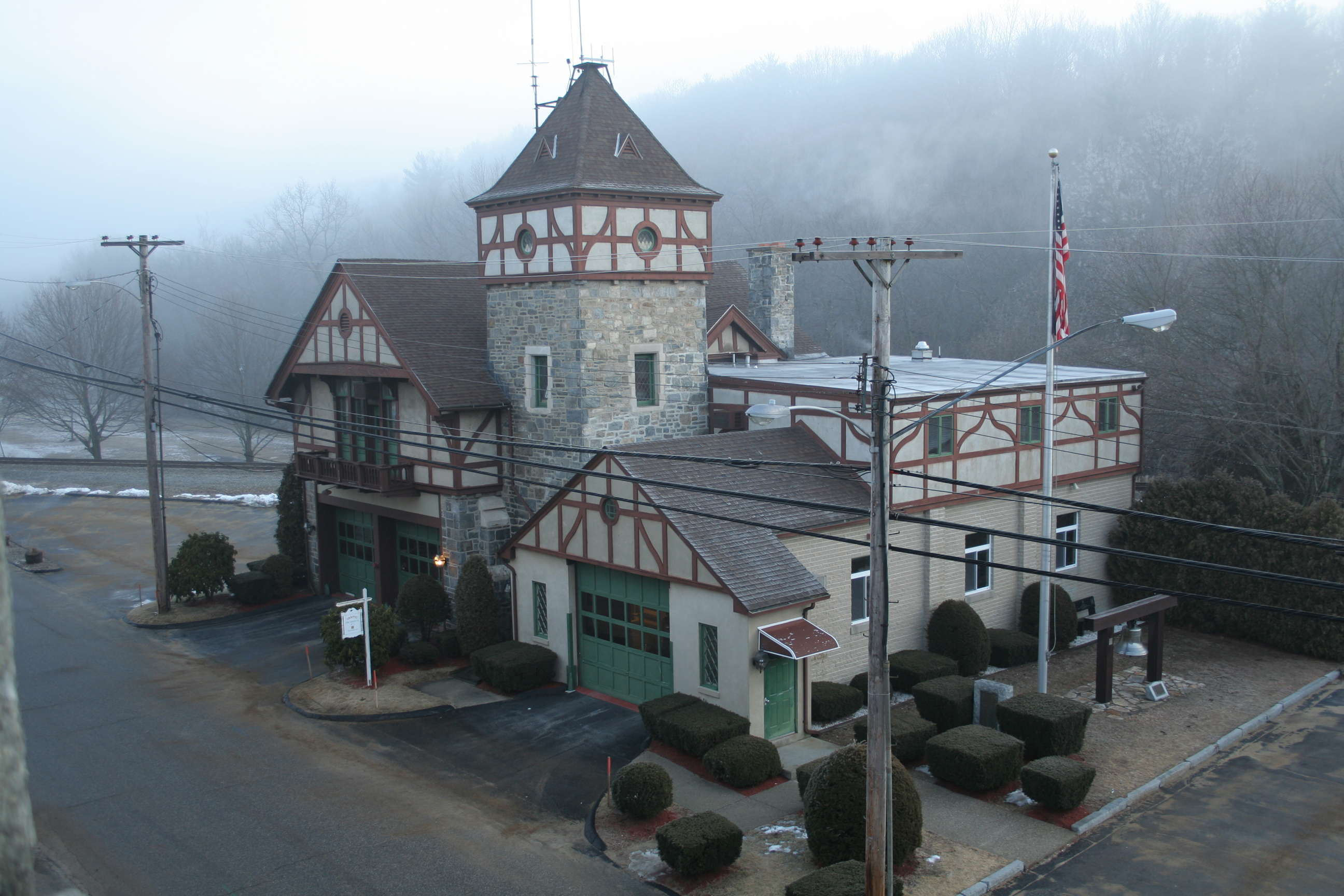
Yantic Firehouse taken from Hale Mill

The village is named after the Yantic River which flows through it. This was originally an independent mill town that was the site of several mills, including the former Yantic Woolen Company Mill. It contains small businesses, houses, some hotels, two highways, a railroad, a firehouse and its picnic grounds, and the mill buildings. The New England Central Railroad tracks cross the Yantic River in Yantic over a truss bridge. Nearby, Sunnyside Street crosses the Yantic River over a unique stone bridge whose western end is flanked by two small towers. The Yantic Volunteer Fire Department is located opposite the former mill.

Due to the planned nature of the mill towns that are now part of Norwich, Yantic contains a grid pattern street with mill house duplexes and Grace Episcopal Church.

The last operator of the mill was the Hale Manufacturing Company, which ended production at the mill in 1988. In the early 1990s a project to convert the mill to a resort hotel was begun. However, plagued by financial and construction mis-management since 1995, it has been the latest failed attempt to revitalize the economic vitality of the once thriving village.

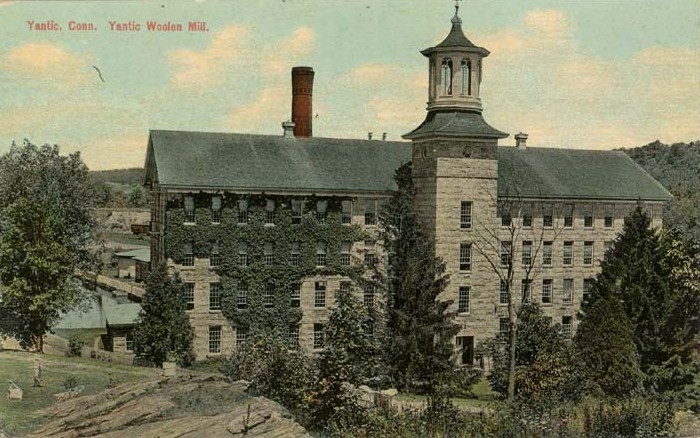
Yantic Woolen Company mill in 1912

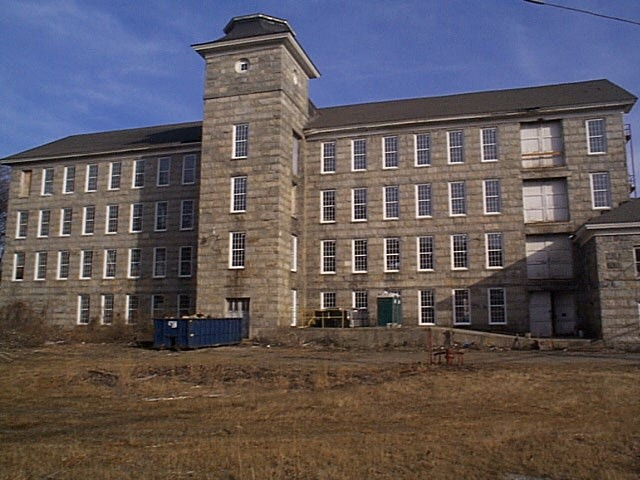
Hale Manufacturing Company mill
