= Wyassup Lake =

Lake in Connecticut, US

Coordinates: 41°29′24″N 71°52′21″W

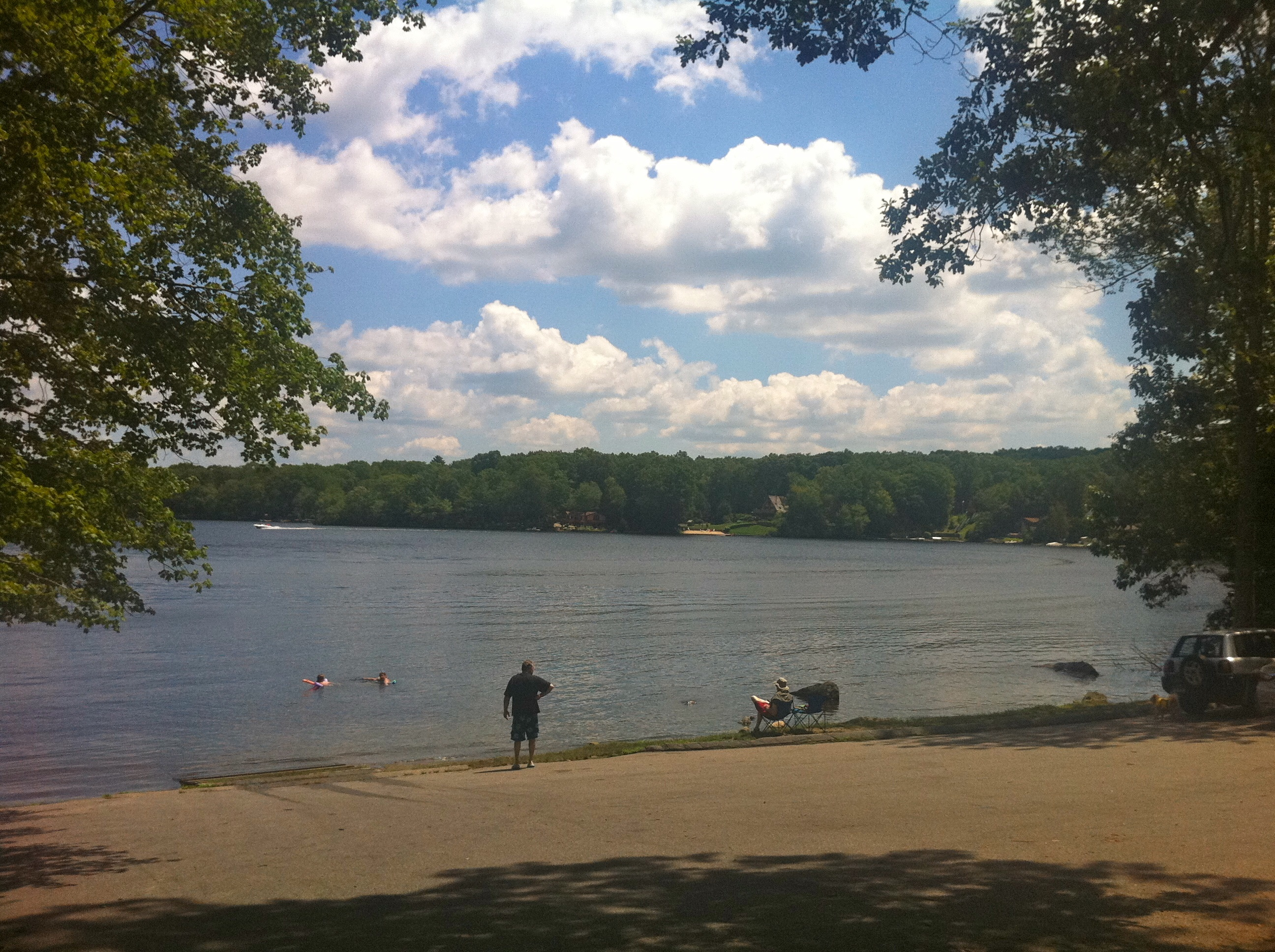

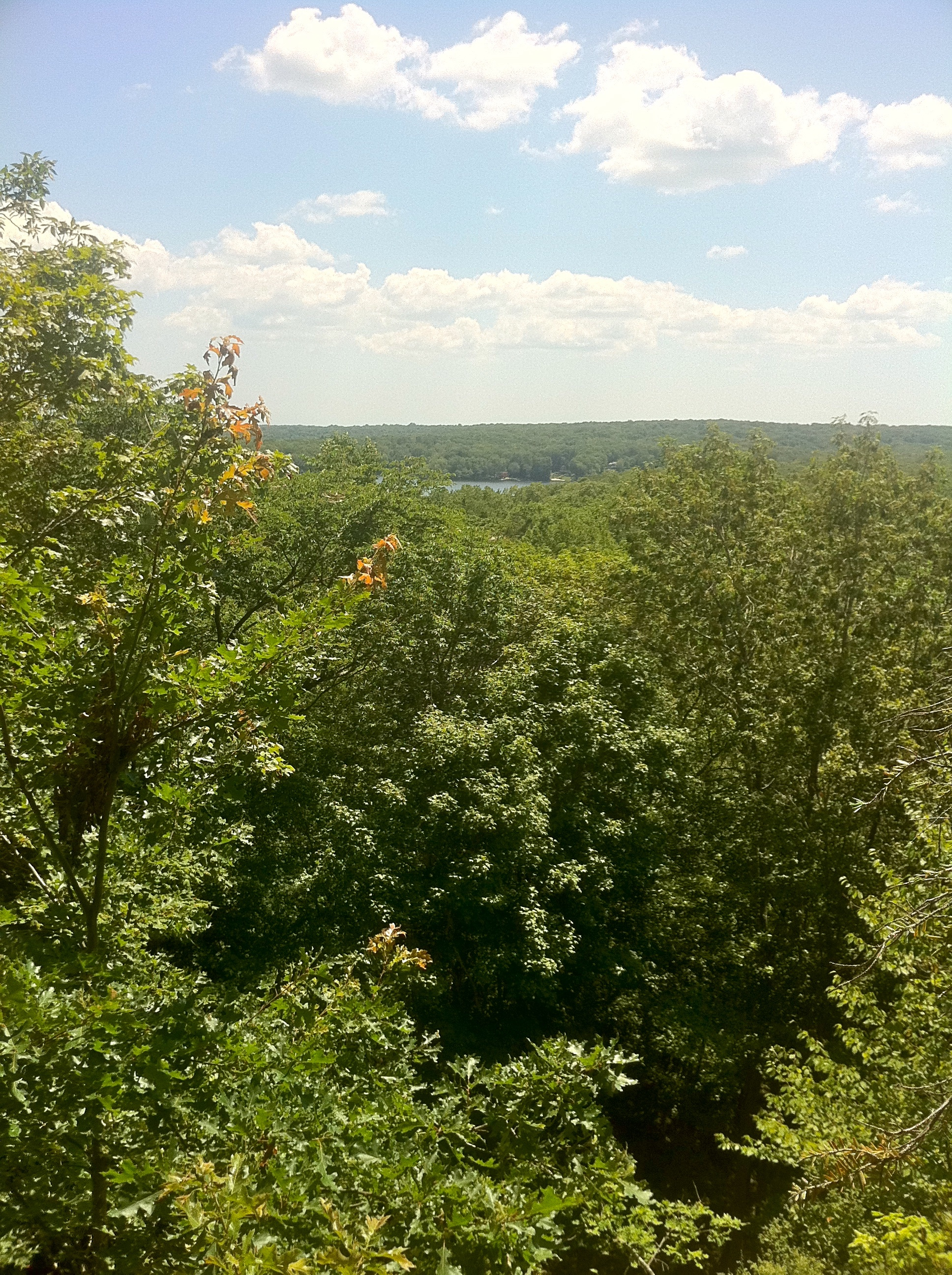

Wyassup Lake in North Stonington is in New London County, Connecticut. It covers 92.7 acres with a maximum depth of 28 feet and an average depth of 8.9 feet. It is the source of Wyassup Brook, a very narrow brook that is flows through the Pachaug State Forest.

It was a pond with an island until the water level was raised some 17 feet. The west side of the lake borders the Pachaug State Forest. There are homes and a road around the lake and a public boat access launch on the southwestern shoreline. There are four islands near the middle of the lake.

A kayaker died on the lake in 2021. In 2021, mosquitoes captured near the lake tested positive for West Nile Virus. In 2022, a 3-year-old died in a boating accident on the lake.

The Lake is a setting in the mystery novel The Lake Mystery: Secrets of the Crossroads by a local professor.

Various plant species were recorded growing in the lake. An inventory of the natural resource base of the watershed surrounding the lake was conducted. In 2013 a 10-year forest management plan for the Pachaug State Forest Wyassup Block was published.
