= Bozrah, Connecticut =

- Town
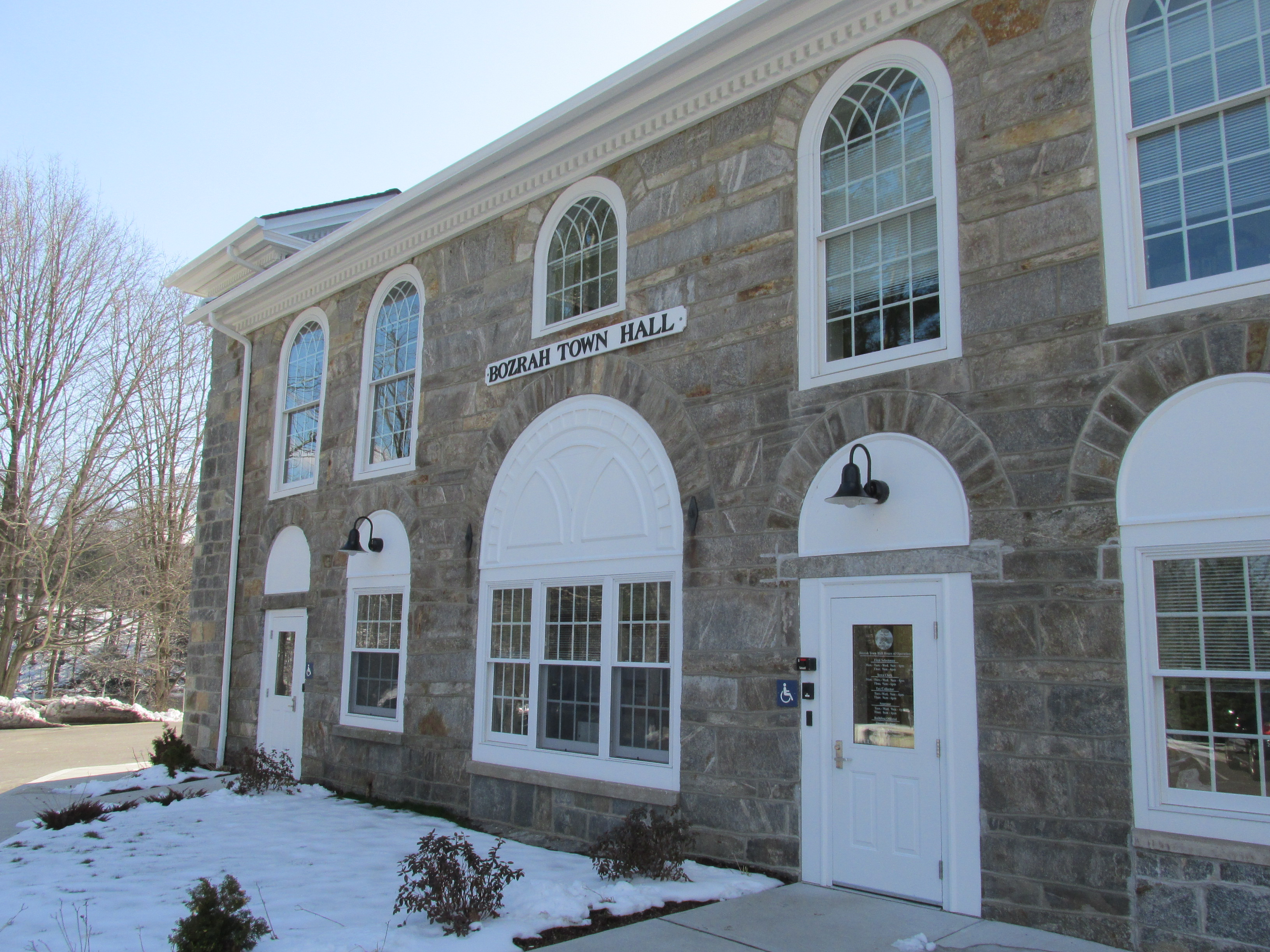
- Town Hall

- Seal

- Interactive map of Bozrah, Connecticut
- Coordinates: 41°33′N 72°11′W
- Country: United States
- U.S. state: Connecticut
- County: New London
- Region: Southeastern CT
- Incorporated: 1786

Government
  - Type: Selectman-town meeting
  - First selectman: Glenn Pianka (D)
  - Selectmen: William Ballinger (D); Jeremy Tarasevich (R)

Area
  - Total: 20.2 sq mi (52.4 km^{2})
  - Land: 20.0 sq mi (51.7 km^{2})
  - Water: 0.27 sq mi (0.7 km^{2})
- Elevation: 180 ft (55 m)

Population (2020)
  - Total: 2,429
  - Density: 122/sq mi (47.0/km^{2})
- Time zone: UTC-5 (Eastern)
  - Summer (DST): UTC-4 (Eastern)
- ZIP Code: 06334, 06336
- Area codes: 860/959
- FIPS code: 09-06820
- GNIS feature ID: 0213394
- Website: www.townofbozrah.org

Bozrah is a town in New London County, Connecticut, United States. The town is part of the Southeastern Connecticut Planning Region. The population was 2,429 at the 2020 census. Bozrah contains three villages: Fitchville, the town center; Leffingwell, a crossroads on Route 82; and Gilman, a mill village along Fitchville Road.

== History ==
The area that became Bozrah was first settled as part of the original "nine-miles-square" of Norwich as well as part of the Parish of West Farms. The area became its own parish, called "New Concord" or the "Fourth Society of Norwich", in 1737, and was incorporated as the town of Bozrah in 1786.

== A legend about the origin of the town's name ==
Bozrah is the name of a pastoral community mentioned several times in the Old Testament, sometimes with pleasing connotations, sometimes not. The town name may have resulted from the happy connotations connected with Micah chapter 2, verse 12: "I will surely gather the remnant of Israel; I will put them together as the sheep of Bozrah, as the flock in the midst of their fold; they shall make a great noise by reason of the multitude of men." In Hebrew, the name Bozrah signifies "an enclosure".

According to a persistent legend, the name "Bozrah" was derived from another Biblical text, which came to someone's mind under the particular circumstances surrounding the community's petition to the Connecticut General Assembly for township status. Whether or not the story is true, the informal, early name "New Concord" was dropped when the town was incorporated.

The community, according to the legend, really wanted to call itself "Bath" after the famous spa in England. The local man chosen to carry the parish's request to Hartford had a somewhat eccentric manner of dress, however, and when he appeared before the Legislature he was dressed in loud, parti-colored homespun so odd as to bring to the mind of one amused legislator the query of Isaiah 63:1: "Who is this that cometh from Edom, with dyed garments from Bozrah?" Overcome by the humorous appropriateness of this verse, the Assembly decided to name the town "Bozrah" when it incorporated the place.

== Points of interest ==
- Bozrah Congregational Church and Parsonage, at 17 and 23 Bozrah St., was added to the National Register of Historic Places on August 26, 1991.
- Hopemead State Park, an undeveloped 60-acre recreation area.

== Geography ==
According to the United States Census Bureau, the town has a total area of 20.2 square miles (52.4 km^{2}), of which 20.0 square miles (51.7 km^{2}) is land and 0.27 square miles (0.7 km^{2}), or 1.38%, is water. The town is bordered by the city of Norwich to the east and by the town of Montville to the south, Salem to the southwest, Colchester to the west, Lebanon to the northwest, and Franklin to the north. 529-acre (2.14 km^{2}) Gardner Lake, a popular recreational destination, occupies the southwestern corner of the town and extends into Salem and Montville.

== Demographics ==
Historical population
Census	Pop.	Note	%±
1820	1,085		—
1830	1,079		−0.6%
1840	1,067		−1.1%
1850	867		−18.7%
1860	1,216		40.3%
1870	984		−19.1%
1880	1,155		17.4%
1890	1,005		−13.0%
1900	799		−20.5%
1910	861		7.8%
1920	858		−0.3%
1930	859		0.1%
1940	904		5.2%
1950	1,154		27.7%
1960	1,590		37.8%
1970	2,036		28.1%
1980	2,135		4.9%
1990	2,297		7.6%
2000	2,357		2.6%
2010	2,627		11.5%
2020	2,429		−7.5%
U.S. Decennial Census

As of the census of 2000, there were 2,357 people, 883 households, and 662 families residing in the town. The population density was 118.0 inhabitants per square mile (45.6/km^{2}). There were 917 housing units at an average density of 45.9 per square mile (17.7/km^{2}). The racial makeup of the town was 96.39% White, 0.55% African American, 0.85% Native American, 0.51% Asian, 0.04% Pacific Islander, 0.51% from other races, and 1.15% from two or more races. Hispanic or Latino of any race were 1.78% of the population.

There were 883 households, out of which 32.6% had children under the age of 18 living with them, 62.6% were married couples living together, 7.4% had a female householder with no husband present, and 25.0% were non-families. 19.6% of all households were made up of individuals, and 6.3% had someone living alone who was 65 years of age or older. The average household size was 2.64 and the average family size was 3.03.

In the town, the population was spread out, with 23.5% under the age of 18, 5.9% from 18 to 24, 30.1% from 25 to 44, 26.5% from 45 to 64, and 14.0% who were 65 years of age or older. The median age was 40 years. For every 100 females, there were 100.8 males. For every 100 females age 18 and over, there were 101.6 males.

The median income for a household in the town was $57,059, and the median income for a family was $65,481. Males had a median income of $45,291 versus $27,361 for females. The per capita income for the town was $26,569. About 2.2% of families and 3.7% of the population were below the poverty line, including 5.5% of those under age 18 and 4.7% of those age 65 or over.

As of 2015, the median household income in Bozrah was estimated to be $77,045, compared to $70,331 for the State of Connecticut as a whole. The low income rate, defined as all persons whose annual household income is less than 200 percent of the poverty threshold, was 22%, compared to 30% statewide.

Voter Registration and Party Enrollment as of October 29, 2019
Party	Active Voters	Inactive Voters	Total Voters	Percentage
Democratic	608	24	632	33.02%
Republican	403	11	414	21.63%
Unaffiliated	783	34	817	42.69%
Minor Parties	49	2	51	2.66%
Total	1,843	71	1,914	100%

Presidential Election Results
Year	Democratic	Republican	Third Parties
2024	42.9% 685	55.5% 885	1.6% 25
2020	45.4% 703	52.8% 817	1.8% 28
2016	38.6% 536	55.0% 764	6.4% 89
2012	50.4% 648	47.0% 606	2.6% 34
2008	52.1% 723	45.6% 633	2.3% 32
2004	51.4% 723	45.9% 646	2.7% 38
2000	51.5% 687	41.9% 561	6.6% 89
1996	47.3% 574	32.7% 398	20.0% 243
1992	35.9% 471	30.7% 404	33.4% 439
1988	42.1% 479	56.1% 639	1.8% 21
1984	34.2% 387	65.7% 745	0.1% 2
1980	38.4% 414	50.0% 540	11.6% 126
1976	47.3% 452	52.4% 502	0.3% 3
1972	35.5% 331	63.9% 599	0.6% 6
1968	46.6% 398	47.7% 408	5.7% 49
1964	66.3% 549	33.7% 279	0.00% 0
1960	47.0% 367	53.0% 415	0.00% 0
1956	41.2% 393	58.8% 668	0.00% 0

== Education ==
The town's educational center, Fields Memorial School, serves grades Preschool to 8, and is located in Fitchville. While there is no high school in Bozrah, the town pays tuition for students attending Norwich Free Academy or Lyman Memorial; the state pays for students' tuition at Norwich Technical High School and Waterford High School.

== Notable people ==
- Sam Gejdenson (born 1948), former United States congressman
- Alanson Hodges Hough (1803–1886), physician and politician
- Elijah Baldwin Huntington (1816–1877), author and Congregationalist minister
- Ishmail Spicer (1760–1832), composer, publisher and teacher
- Reuben Hyde Walworth (1788–1867), United States congressman, was nominated three times to become Justice of the United States Supreme Court
