= Alanson Hodges Hough =

American politician (1803–1886)

Alanson Hodges Hough (October 26, 1803 – August 18, 1886) was an American medical doctor and politician. He served in the Connecticut Legislature and the Connecticut State Senate.

== Early life ==
Hough was born in Bozrah, Connecticut, October 26, 1803. His father was Jebez Hough, a farmer. His skill in nursing a sick brother led Dr. Samuel Johnson, of Bozrah, to assist him in the study of medicine.

Hough attended lectures at the Berkshire Medical College, in Pittsfield, Massachusetts. He then attended Yale Medical School, graduating in 1832.

== Career ==
Hough moved to Essex, Connecticut in 1832, where he practiced medicine. He moved to Saybrook, Connecticut, on August 18, 1886, and continued his medical practice there. He was elected to the Connecticut State Legislature, followed by the Connecticut State Senate in 1855. He was a Republican.

== Personal life ==
Hough married Mary A. Lathrop of Bozrah, Connecticut on May 13, 1832; she died on July 23, 1833, leaving no children. He then married Susan E. Williams of Essex on August 12, 1834. She was the daughter of Captain William Williams, a mariner. She died November 15, 1872, leaving seven children. They were William C. Hough, Abby Pratt Hough, Mary Adele Hough, Benezette Alanson Hough, Niles Pratt Hough, Grace S. Hough, and Charles S. Hough.

Hough was a member of the Baptist Church in Essex and a deacon there from 1840 until he died. Hough died of apoplexy in Essex on August 18, 1886, at the age of 83 years.
