= Minnie Island State Park =

State park in Connecticut, United States

- Location within Connecticut Location within the United States
- Interactive map of Minnie Island State Park
- Location: Montville and Salem, Connecticut, United States
- Coordinates: 41°30′20″N 72°13′18″W
- Area: 0.88 acres (0.36 ha)
- Elevation: 394 ft (120 m)
- Established: 1925
- Administrator: Connecticut Department of Energy and Environmental Protection
- Website: Official website
- Connecticut state parks

Minnie Island State Park is a public recreation area occupying a tiny island at the southern end of 529-acre (214 ha) Gardner Lake that is split by the townline between Salem and Montville, Connecticut. It is accessible only via boat and offers opportunities for picnicking and fishing as well as general exploration in a largely deserted setting. The 0.88-acre (0.36 ha) island is the state's smallest state park.

== History ==
In the 19th century, the island was owned by a popular music teacher, the founder of Salem's Music Vale Seminary, Oramel Whittlesey (1801-1876). Whittlesey named the island for a niece nicknamed Minnie. In the 1920s, an attempt by squatters to take possession led to the discovery that although the island was claimed by both Salem and Montville, it was not on the tax rolls of either town. In solving the dilemma, the state assembly rejected the squatters' proposed legislation, instead passing a law in 1925 that took possession of the island for the state and turned its management over to the state park's commission.

== Features ==
Writers working for the WPA in the 1930s described Minnie Island as "a pine-grown knoll rising from the lake's depths." It has a steep shoreline with gray outcropped ledges that offers few opportunities for docking. It rises approximately sixteen feet from the surface of Gardner Lake which lies at an elevation of 381 feet (116 m). Its northern shore drops off into the deepest portion of Gardner Lake, some 36 feet (11 m). The island is thickly forested with mountain laurel undergrowth amidst large red oaks. A clearing at the summit may be littered with the detritus of previous visitors. There are no facilities of any kind and no signage.
