= Yantic River =

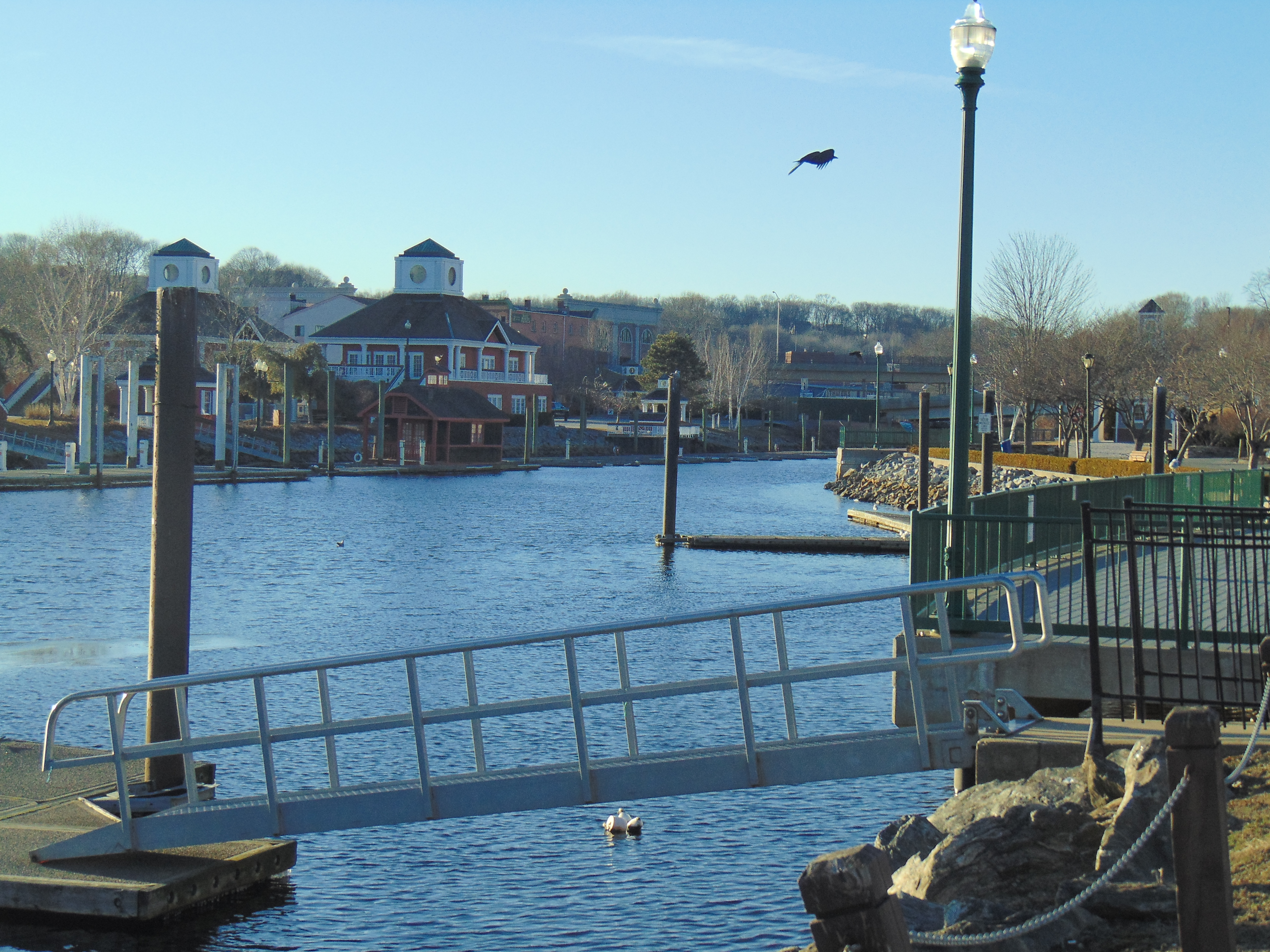
- The Norwich Marina, through which the Yantic River runs.

Location
- Country: United States
- State: Connecticut
- County: New London

Physical characteristics
- Source: Deep River and Sherman Brook
  - location: Lebanon
  - coordinates: 41°34′08″N 72°15′10″W
- Mouth: Shetucket River to form Thames River
  - location: Norwich
  - coordinates: 41°31′18″N 72°04′43″W
- Length: 14.2 miles (22.9 km)
- Width
  - minimum: 5 feet (1.5 m)
  - maximum: 765 feet (233 m)

The Yantic River forms at the confluence of the Deep River, Sherman Brook, and Exeter Brook about 4 miles (6.4 km) east of Colchester, Connecticut. It runs for 14.2 miles (22.9 km) and flows into the Shetucket River in Norwich, forming the Thames River. The Yantic River is a popular whitewater paddling destination with a mix of quickwater and Class I-III whitewater. It passes through the towns of Lebanon, Bozrah, and Norwich. The USS Yantic was named after the river.

== Crossings ==
County	Town	Carrying
New London	Lebanon	Taylor Bridge Road
New London	Lebanon	Norwich Avenue (CT SSR 608)
New London	Lebanon	Camp Mooween Road
New London	Lebanon	Scott Hill Road To Route 2
New London	Lebanon	McGrath Lane (Closed)
New London	Lebanon	Polly Road
New London	Lebanon	Norwich Avenue (CT SSR 608)
New London	Bozrah	Thomas Road
New London	Bozrah	Stanton Road
New London	Bozrah	Fitchville Road (CT SSR 608)
New London	Bozrah	Route 163
New London	Bozrah	Fitchville Road (CT SSR 608)
New London	Norwich	Providence and Worcester RR
New London	Norwich	Route 32
New London	Norwich	Old Route 32 (Closed)
New London	Norwich	Providence and Worcester RR
New London	Norwich	Sunnyside Street
New London	Norwich	Providence and Worcester RR
New London	Norwich	West Town Street
New London	Norwich	Wawecus Street
New London	Norwich	I-395
New London	Norwich	Pleasant Street
New London	Norwich	New London Turnpike
New London	Norwich	Unnamed Road
New London	Norwich	Route 2/ Route 32
New London	Norwich	Providence and Worcester RR
New London	Norwich	Sherman Street
New London	Norwich	Monroe Street
New London	Norwich	Route 32

== See also ==
- List of rivers of Connecticut
