= Versailles, Connecticut =

Village in Sprague, Connecticut, US

- Village
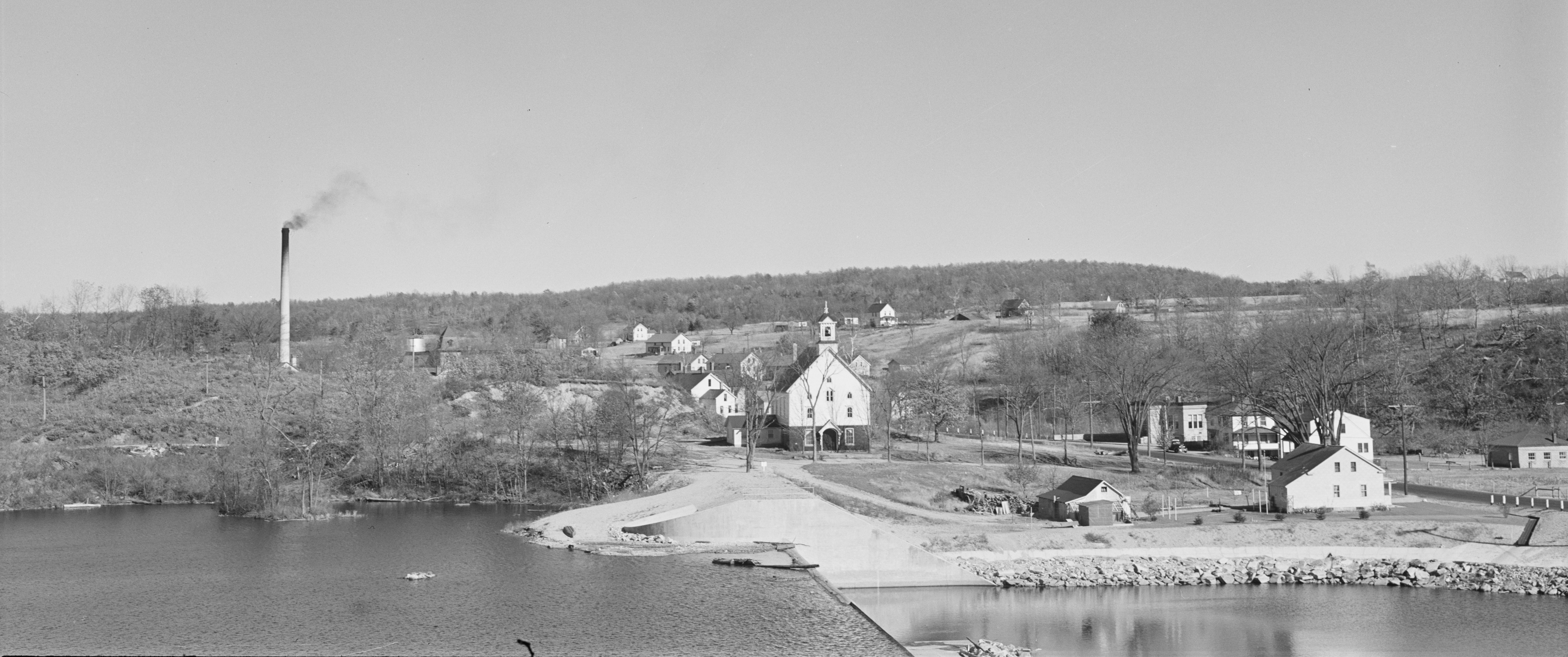
- Versailles in November 1940, as captured facing east from the Occum Hydroelectric Plant and Dam by Jack Delano.
- Etymology: After the Vers-Sayles Woolen Mill.
- Location within Connecticut Location within the United States
- Coordinates: 41°36′6.35″N 72°2′14.27″W
- Postal code: 06383

Versailles (/ˈvɜːrseɪls/ VER-sails) is a village within the town of Sprague, Connecticut located alongside the Shetucket River opposite the village of Occum on land historically inhabited by the Mohegan tribe.

== History ==
Versailles, originally named Eagleville, underwent a transformative period in 1871 when S.L. and T.D. Sayles acquired the Vers Woolen Mill in Eagleville. The renamed Vers-Sayles Woolen Mill is the source of the name Versailles—a respelled portmanteau of Vers and Sayles after the French locality. The village Post Office officially adopted the name Versailles on May 13, 1872, solidifying the village's identity. Notably, the pronunciation of "Versailles" in this Connecticut village mirrors its English spelling, differing from the French pronunciation.

The aftermath of the Civil War brought changes to the religious identity of Versailles. The original Congregational Church faced dwindling attendance, and a devastating fire in 1870 sealed its fate. The following year, residents voted in favor of the Methodist Episcopal denomination, seeking pastoral guidance from the New England Conference. The result was the construction of a new church in 1876, blending Italianate and Victorian Gothic styles. The new Versailles United Methodist Church, situated on a raised brick foundation adorned with small facade windows, became a cornerstone of the community. In 1887, it formed a connection with churches in Baltic and Greenville, fostering a broader religious community.

While Baltic historically served as the dense population center of Sprague, Versailles contributed to the town's growth and industrial landscape. The village included a wood-frame school building, destroyed by fire in the early 20th century. In response, a fire-resistant school was constructed in 1924, coinciding with Sprague's consolidation of schools in its main population centers—Baltic, Hanover, and Versailles. The building served as an educational institution until its sale in the mid-1950s. Subsequently, it found new life as a Masonic lodge and currently houses Dark Manor, a haunted house.
