= Ashlawn =

Historic house in Connecticut

- U.S. National Register of Historic Places
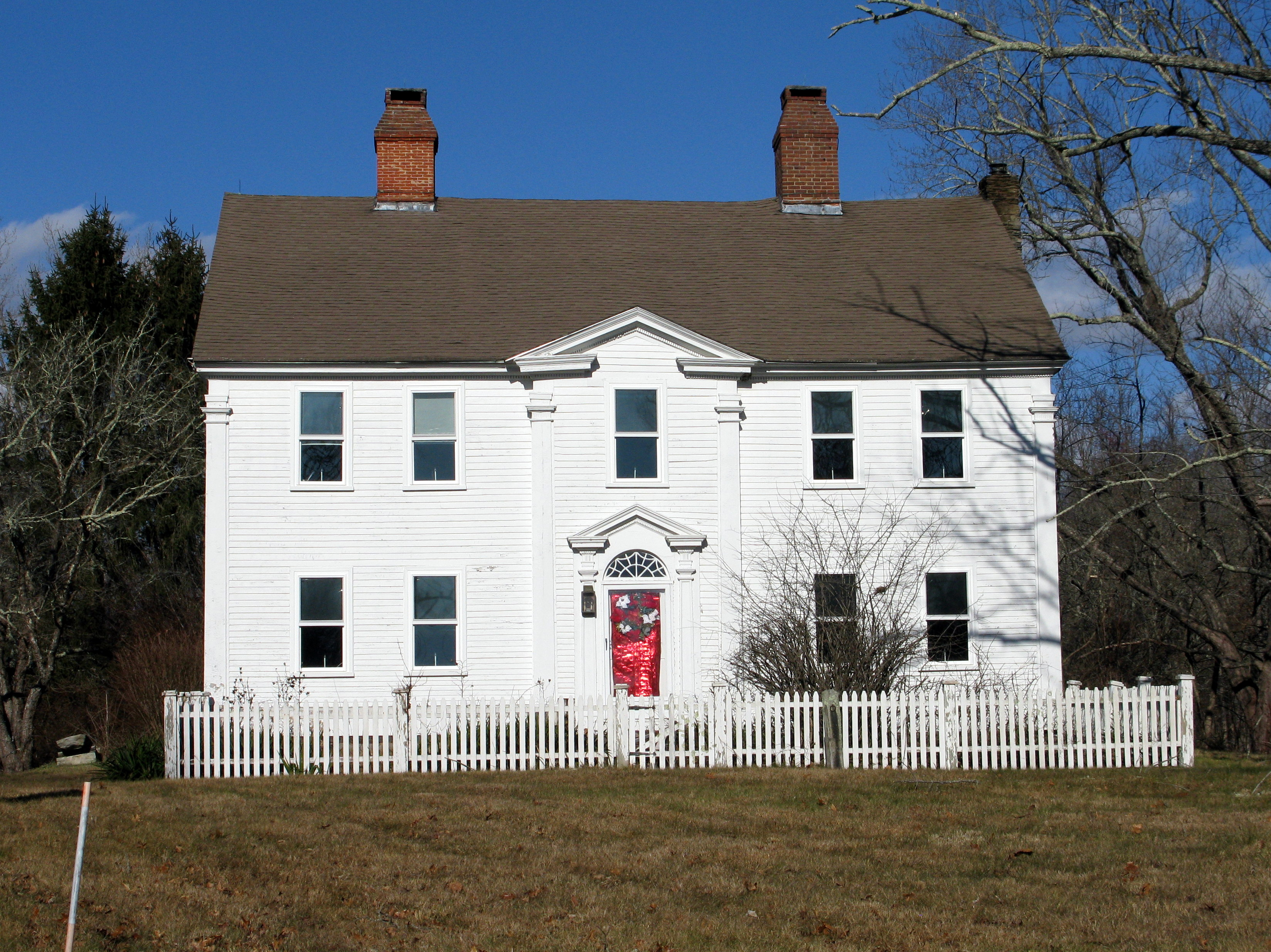
- Ashlawn in December 2025

- Location within Connecticut Location within the United States
- Location: Potash Hill Road, Hanover, Sprague, Connecticut
- Coordinates: 41°37′45″N 72°02′27″W
- Area: 26 acres (11 ha)
- Built: 18th century
- Architectural style: Georgian
- NRHP reference No.: 79002649
- Added to NRHP: June 4, 1979

Ashlawn, also called the Joshua Perkins House, is a two-story, central-hall frame farmhouse dating from the 18th century in Hanover, Connecticut. The house's namesake is its first owner Joshua Perkins. Ashlawn's main house has a five-bay front facade with pilasters supporting broken-base pediments. The inside has woodwork for its moldings and wainscoting. The house was integrated with an older structure, likely a central-chimney house built in the mid-18th century as an ell.

Ashlawn is listed on the National Register of Historic Places as an example of Georgian architecture, and it is locally important for its connection with the Perkins family. It was added to the National Register of Historic Places on June 4, 1979.

== History ==
The Ashlawn property was originally part of a 1,200-acre (490 ha; 1.9 sq mi) parcel purchased by Joseph and Jacob Perkins. Joshua Perkins was born in 1740. He served in the Connecticut state legislature in 1789 and 1801. In 1825, he deeded 400 acres (160 ha) including the house to his son Charles Perkins. Joshua died in 1833 at age 93.

== Construction ==
Ashlawn was named for the ash trees that once sat in front of the house. It is also known as the Joshua Perkins House after its first owner. Ashlawn is described by the National Register of Historic Places as a "late 18th-century, 2-story, central-hall frame farmhouse with a pitched and end gable overhang." The date of construction is unknown, as is the architect. (Note: The article in The Day lists 1740 and 1790 as the dates, but these are listed as "circa" in the documentation.) The house rests upon a fieldstone foundation with dressed stone; the cellar of the house has notches in stone that are believed to have been for the "cool storage of foods". The register lists the architecture as being Georgian.

The five-bay front facade has two flat Doric pilasters and two more pilasters, located off the central bay support the broken base pediment. The original door was replaced with a 19th-century door that has a 20-pane fanlight and is flanked by two flat pilasters that support the broken base pediment over the door. The main house originally had two-chimney design and another chimney was added to the east wall for a 20th-century furnace. Most of the windows in the house were replaced in the 19th century with 2-over-2 sash, except for two attic windows of each end of the gable which retain the smaller paned sashes. The house includes an earlier 1 1/2-story ell in the rear that appears to have been a two-room central chimney structure that was integrated into the design of the main house and built in the second quarter of the 18th century. The chimney was replaced in the 19th century. A storage shed also sits behind the house. The property also had a dairy barn that was rebuilt following its destruction in the 1938 New England hurricane.

The register's nomination gives details of the paneling and molding throughout the house. Entering through the front of the house leads to the central hall with a paneled wainscot below the chair rail, forward of the rising stairwell on the left. There is cornice molding and a molded chair rail with runners for the inside shutters. (Note: These were not installed at time of the nomination.) The woodwork in the west front room has a paneled fireplace and is wainscoted below the chair rail. The east rear room is divided in two, with one of the divisions being a bathroom. The upstairs rooms have molded chair rails and cased flair posts. However, the east front room lacks a fireplace while the western one is paneled as the first floor's front west room. The roof of the house is framed by sawn collar beams that were pegged to rafters which were hewn. The chimney stacks are angled so that they emerge symmetrically from the roof.

The original entrance to the cell in the center along the east wall, the door was replaced with a modern door at the time of nomination. Inside, a winding staircase leads to the attic. To the north is the kitchen, retaining a hewn summer beam and flared cased posts while sporting modern cabinets and wallpaper. The room to the south also has a visible hewn summer beam and its original casing on the flared posts. The attic is finished with vertically placed beaded boarding, and the roof is framed with hewn rafters.

== Importance ==
The National Register of Historic Places nomination form describes Ashlawn as a historically significant as "an expression of rural Georgian architecture and for its associations with the Perkins family, particularly influential in the settlement of the Hanover section of Sprague." The nomination also notes that it is "one of the finest of its type in the surrounding area", calling it a stylish farmhouse built for a prominent farmer. The Town of Sprague placed it among the many historic districts in their small area, which "add substantial aesthetic value" on top of being historic. (Note: The Occum Hydroelectric Plant and Dam and the Baltic Historic District were also given this description.)

In 2002, Ruth Rosiene, a descendant of the Perkinses and Ashlawn's owner, was featured in an article by The Day. Rosiene had been maintaining the house for years, which required repainting every four or five years. A photo in the article shows the latch on the door that was described as possibly original. The article notes that the original sliding shutters are now absent, whereas the original nomination form from 1979 stated they were not installed.

== See also ==
- National Register of Historic Places listings in New London County, Connecticut
