= William Park House =

Historic house in Connecticut, United States

- U.S. National Register of Historic Places
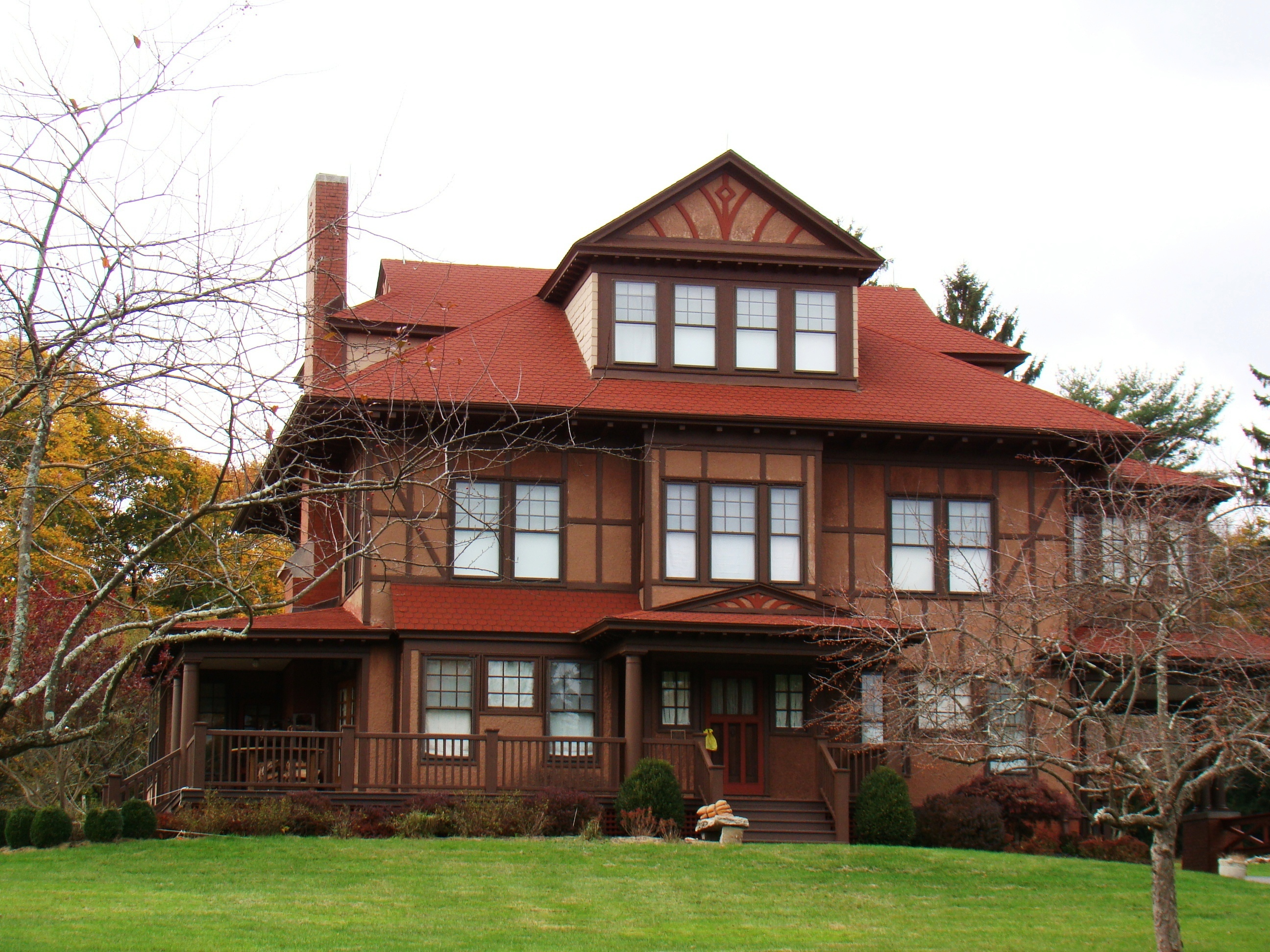

- Location within Connecticut Location within the United States
- Location: 330 Main Street, Sprague, Connecticut
- Coordinates: 41°38′42″N 72°3′57″W
- Area: 3.2 acres (1.3 ha)
- Built: 1913
- Built by: McWilliams, Peck
- Architectural style: Bungalow/craftsman, Prairie School
- NRHP reference No.: 07000106
- Added to NRHP: March 7, 2007

The William Park House is a historic house at 330 Main Street in Sprague, Connecticut. Built in 1913, it is a prominent local example of an American Foursquare house with Craftsman/Bungalow features. It was built for William Park, owner of the Angus Park Woolen Company, a major local employer. The house was listed on the National Register of Historic Places in 2007.

== Description and history ==
The William Park House is located in the mill village of Hanover, on a 3-acre (1.2 ha) parcel bounded by Main, Spruce, and Pearl Streets. It is a 2 1/2-story wood-frame structure, roughly rectangular in shape, with a wraparound porch and porte cochere. It is covered by a hip roof, obscured somewhat by large dormers that have broad bands of windows with either gabled or gable-on-hip rooflines. The walls are finished in stucco and half-timbering. Most windows are sash, with a multilight top sash and a single-pane lower sash, a distinctive Prairie School touch. The interior retains high quality woodwork and carved plasterwork, including staircase balustrades and builtin cabinetry.

The house was built in 1913 by Peck McWilliams, a master builder who may also have been responsible for its design. The American Foursquare, particularly with clear Prairie School features, is not commonly found in Connecticut, and this is a particularly high quality example of the form. It was built for William Park, the son of Angus Park, founder of the Angus Park Woolen Company. The elder Park had founded the business in 1899, buying an old textile mill and upgrading its infrastructure. Under William Park and his son (also named Angus), that business would surviving until 1970.

== See also ==
- National Register of Historic Places listings in New London County, Connecticut
