= Little River (Shetucket River tributary) =

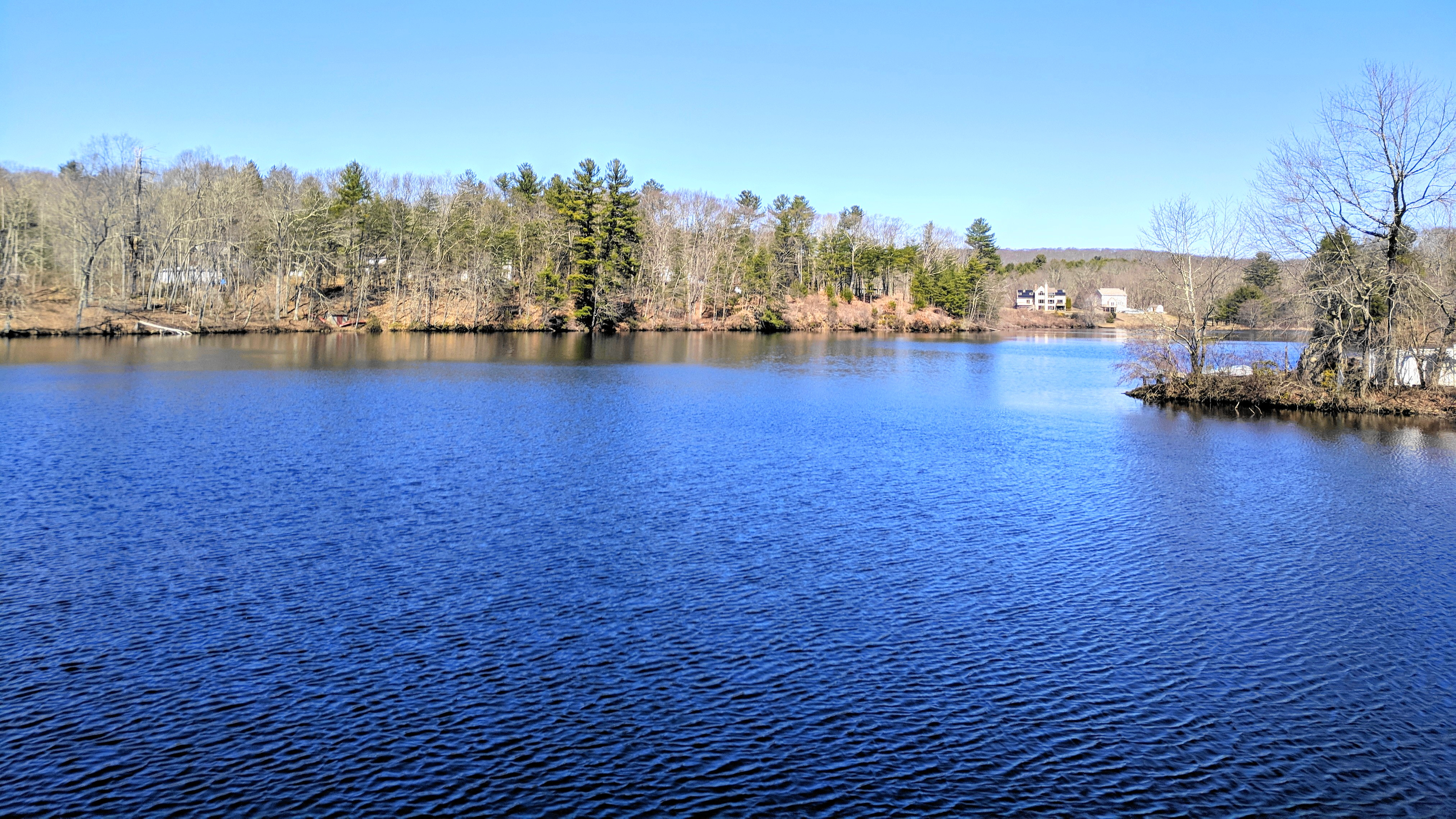
- The Little River at Hanover Reservoir.

Location
- Country: United States
- State: Connecticut
- Towns: Hampton, Scotland, Canterbury, Sprague, Norwich

Physical characteristics
- Source
  - location: Hampton Reservoir, Hampton
  - coordinates: 41.4925°N 72.0328°W
- Mouth
  - location: Shetucket River, Occum, Norwich
  - coordinates: 41.3542°N 72.0250°W
- Length: 21.7 mi (34.9 km)
- Basin size: 30 mi^{2} (78 km^{2})
- Width
  - minimum: 12 feet (3.7 m)
  - average: 64 feet (20 m)
  - maximum: 240 feet (73 m)
- Discharge
  - location: Hanover, CT
  - average: 68.1 cubic feet (1.93 m^{3})
  - minimum: 24.2 cubic feet (0.69 m^{3}), 2002 Annual Discharge
  - maximum: 86.2 cubic feet (2.44 m^{3}), 1984 Annual Discharge

Basin features
- Population: 8,000
- Tributaries
  - left: Cedar Swamp Brook
  - right: Downing Brook, Peck Brook
- Waterbodies: Hanover Reservoir, Papermill Pond, Versailles Pond
- Bridges: Route 97, US 6, Route 14, Route 138

The Little River is a river that runs through the towns of Hampton, Canterbury, Scotland, and Sprague, Connecticut. It begins at Hampton Reservoir in northern Hampton, CT and snakes its way down into the Shetucket River at the town borders of Norwich, Sprague, and Lisbon, CT

== Crossings ==
Whole River is in Connecticut

County	Town	Crossing Name	Coordinates
Windham	Hampton	Airline State Park Trail	41.8223°N 72.0570°W
Windham	Hampton	Kenyon Road	41.8204°N 72.0568°W
Windham	Hampton	Route 97	41.8064°N 72.0562°W
Windham	Hampton	Old Kings Highway	41.8039°N 72.0578°W
Windham	Hampton	Hammond Hill Road	41.7930°N 72.0506°W
Windham	Hampton	North Bigelow Road	41.7802°N 72.0450°W
Windham	Hampton	East Old Route 6	41.7791°N 72.0443°W
Windham	Hampton	US 6	41.7718°N 72.0436°W
Windham	Hampton	Drain Street	41.7698°N 72.0444°W
Windham	Hampton	Sand Hill Road	41.7593°N 72.0493°W
Windham	Hampton	Windham Road	41.7432°N 72.0526°W
Windham	Scotland	None	
Windham	Canterbury	Route 14	41.7024°N 72.0548°W
Windham	Canterbury	Miller Goodwin Con.	41.6932°N 72.0492°W
Windham	Canterbury	Woodchuck Hill Road	41.6702°N 72.0538°W
New London	Sprague	Parkwood Road	41.6472°N 72.0605°W
New London	Sprague	Potash Hill Road	41.6391°N 72.0578°W
New London	Sprague	Route 138	41.6150°N 72.0421°W
New London	Sprague	Providence and Worcester RR	41.6140°N 72.0430°W
New London	Sprague	Riverside Road	41.5998°N 72.0456°W
New London	Sprague	Main Street/Inland Road	41.5998°N 72.0456°W
New London	Norwich	None/ End of River	41.5947°N 72.0474°W
