= Leo Connellan =

Leo Connellan may refer to:

- Leo Connellan (poet)
- Leo Connellan (politician)
