= Greeneville Historic District =

Greeneville Historic District may refer to:

- Greeneville Historic District (Norwich, Connecticut), NRHP-listed
- Greeneville Historic District (Greeneville, Tennessee), listed on the NRHP in Greene County, Tennessee
