= Connecticut Eastern Railroad Museum =

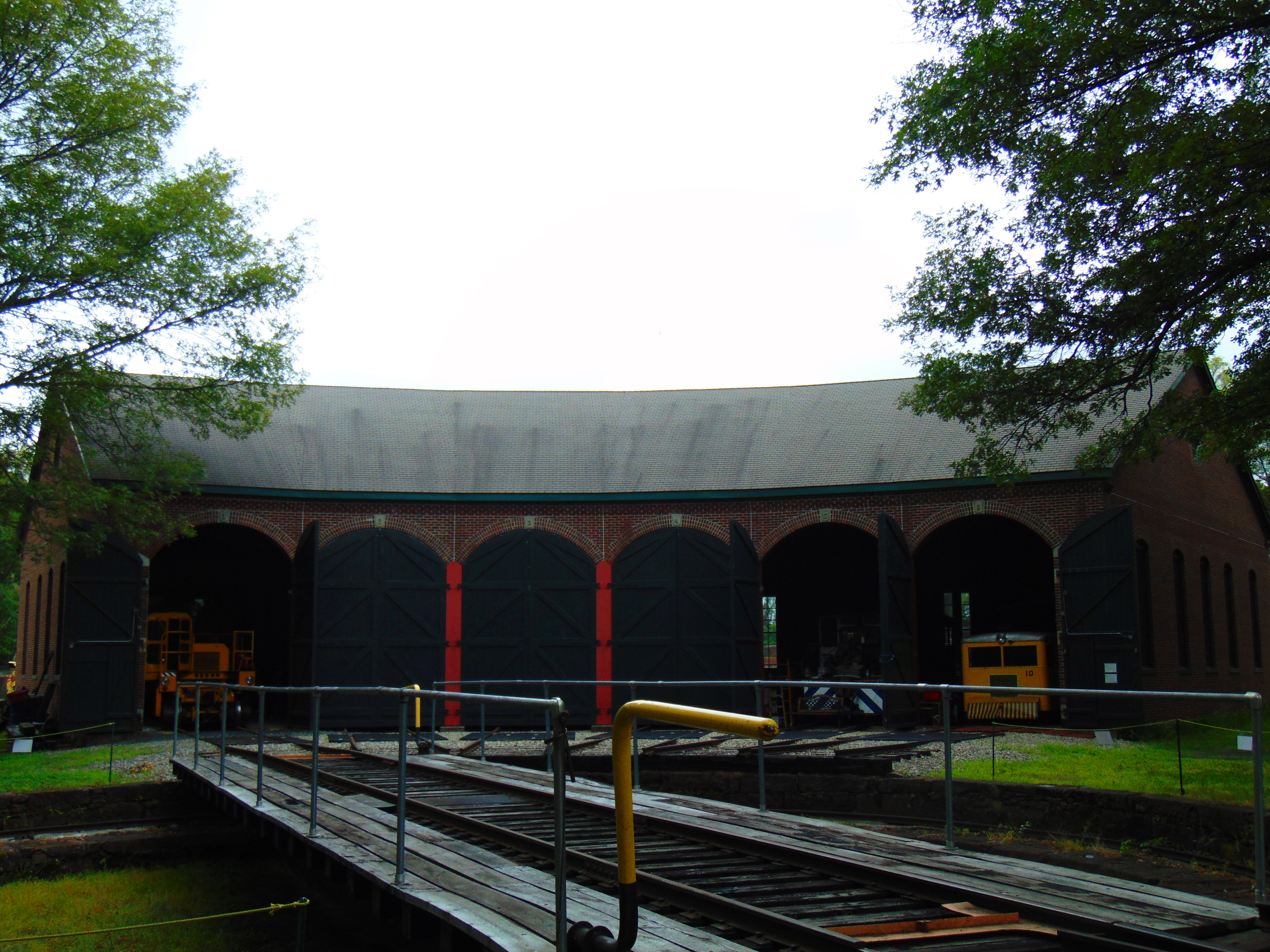
- The roundhouse at the museum.

- Location within Connecticut
- Established: 1995
- Location: Willimantic, Connecticut
- Coordinates: 41.7149°N 72.2356°W
- Type: Railroad museum
- Accreditation: National Railway Historical Society
- Key holdings: EMD FL9 from New Haven Railroad
- Collections: Steam locomotive, diesel-electric trains, 2 train stations, and a replica roundhouse
- Collection size: 28
- Visitors: 1,000 (2015)
- Public transit access: Windham Region Transit District
- Parking: Nearby Bridge St. (CT 32)
- Website: www.cteastrailroad.org

The Connecticut Eastern Railroad Museum is a railroad museum located on Route 32 in Willimantic, Connecticut. It was founded by members of the Connecticut Eastern Chapter of the National Railway Historical Society.

The museum is home to a replica Columbia Roundhouse built in 2000. It holds many exhibits, including the former train station for Chaplin, twelve diesel-electric trains, and four steam locomotives. The Air Line Trail runs along the edge of the property, as did the Connecticut Eastern railroad for which the museum is named. The roundhouse contains a 60-foot Armstrong turntable.

== Structures on Site ==
=== Columbia Junction Roundhouse ===
The original Columbia Junction roundhouse was constructed in 1892 and was torn down in the 1930s. The site was cleared of trees and debris in 1991, and the museum was established in 1995. The museum was able to reconstruct the roundhouse as part of a $400,000 grant package secured by Senator Donald Williams in 1998, as well as to complete site improvements and bring utilities to the property. The exterior walls were reconstructed in 2000, using the original foundation as a base. A special ceremony was held on June 10, 2001 to lay the cornerstone. Exterior doors were hung the following year.

The roundhouse is now home to some of the museum's historic collection of trains. A replacement 60-foot, manually operated turntable was purchased from Edaville Railroad in 1994, moved to the site, and installed by museum volunteers.

=== Willimantic Section House ===
A section house was used to store tools and equipment used by maintainers who were in charge of a "section" of track as their territory. This former New Haven Railroad section house was located in Willimantic, and moved to the museum site in 1992. It was restored the following year and is used by museum volunteers to store tools.

=== Groton Freight House ===
This former New Haven freight house was once located in Groton, Connecticut along the main line opposite Groton tower, on property belonging to Amtrak and no longer needed. Amtrak donated the structure to the museum in 1998; it was moved there in 1999 and restored by volunteers.

=== Chaplin Station ===
This building was first used as a train station in 1872 by the Boston, Hartford and Erie Railroad to serve Clarks Corner, just across the town line from Chaplin, Connecticut. It was originally built as a commercial building, possibly a tin shop, and later converted for use as a train station for the small community. The BH&E became a part of the New Haven by 1898. The station was replaced by a larger structure in 1901, and the station master purchased the old building and had it moved to his backyard. The family later donated the station to the museum and it was relocated in 1995.

=== Versailles Operator's Shanty ===
This small shanty housed a telegraph operator who would relay orders between the dispatcher and train crews. This shanty was located in Versailles, Connecticut, and was used by the New Haven Railroad. When the telegraph station was closed, it was purchased by an employee who had it moved to his property. It was donated and moved to the museum in 2000, where it is currently used as a ticket booth and information center.

== Equipment roster ==
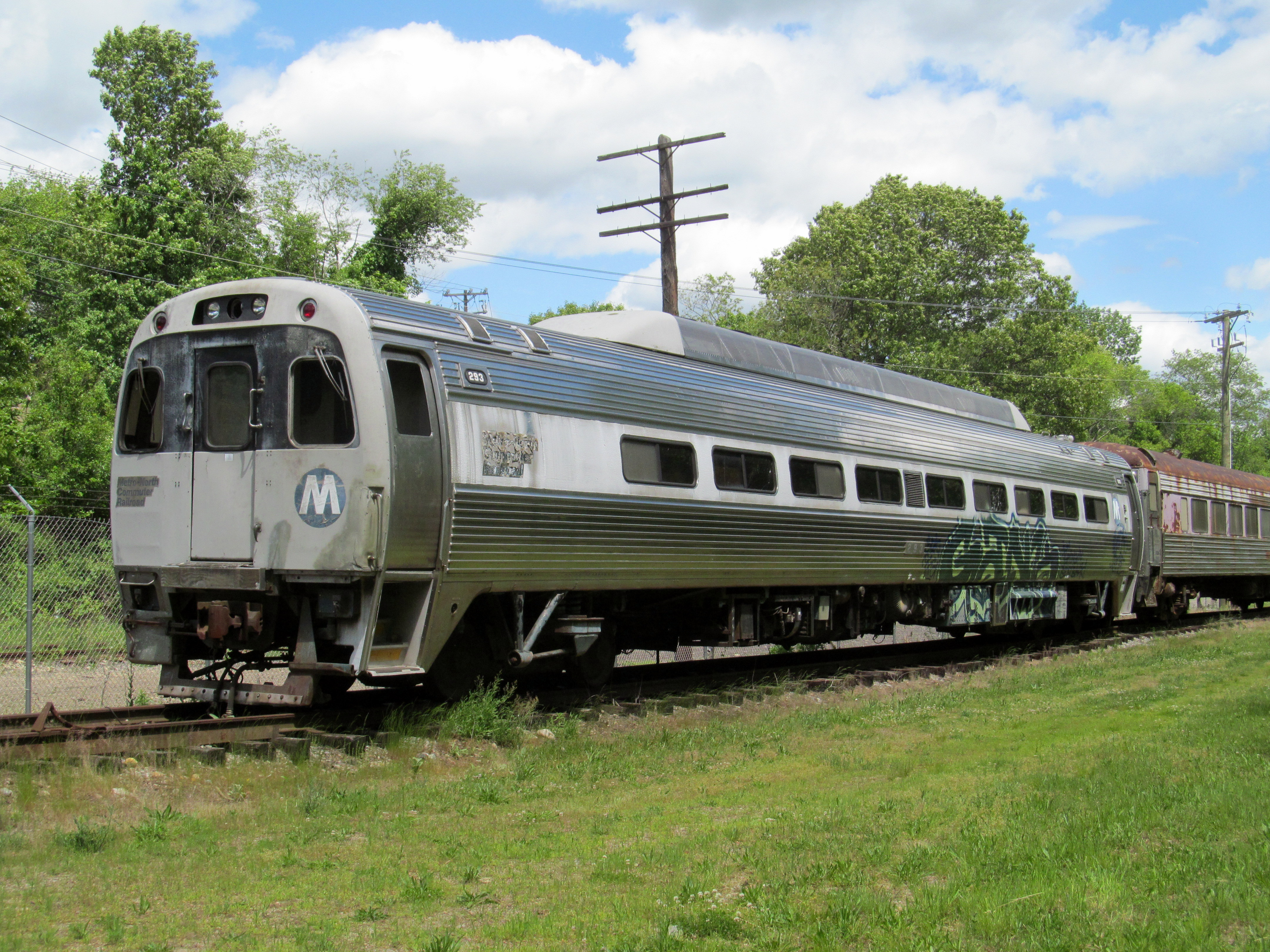
SPV-2000 #293 in 2017

The museum is home to several pieces of railroad equipment with ties to the region's history.

- New Haven EMD FL9 No. 2057 (ex-CDOT 2023)
- Metro-North Railroad Budd SPV-2000 No. 293
- Pfizer Corp. EMD SW-8 No. 2 (ex-WAB 130)
- Northeast Utilities General Electric 25-ton
- New Haven Terminal GE 45-ton No. 0413
- Central Vermont Railway Alco S-4 No. 8081
- CERM GE 44-ton No. 0800 (ex-LIRR, ex-VALE)
- Baldwin Locomotive Works 0-4-0 No. 10
- New Haven baggage car No. 3841
- New Haven coach No. 4414
- New Haven coach No. 8673 and No. 8695
- Central Vermont Railway boxcar No. 43022
- Grand Trunk Western Railway boxcar No. 515747
- Central Vermont Railway flatcar No. 4287
- Central Vermont Railway caboose No. 4052

== See also ==
- Hop River Trail
- Willimantic Freight House and Office
- Jillson Mills
- Windham Town Hall
