= Occum Hydroelectric Plant and Dam =

- U.S. National Register of Historic Places
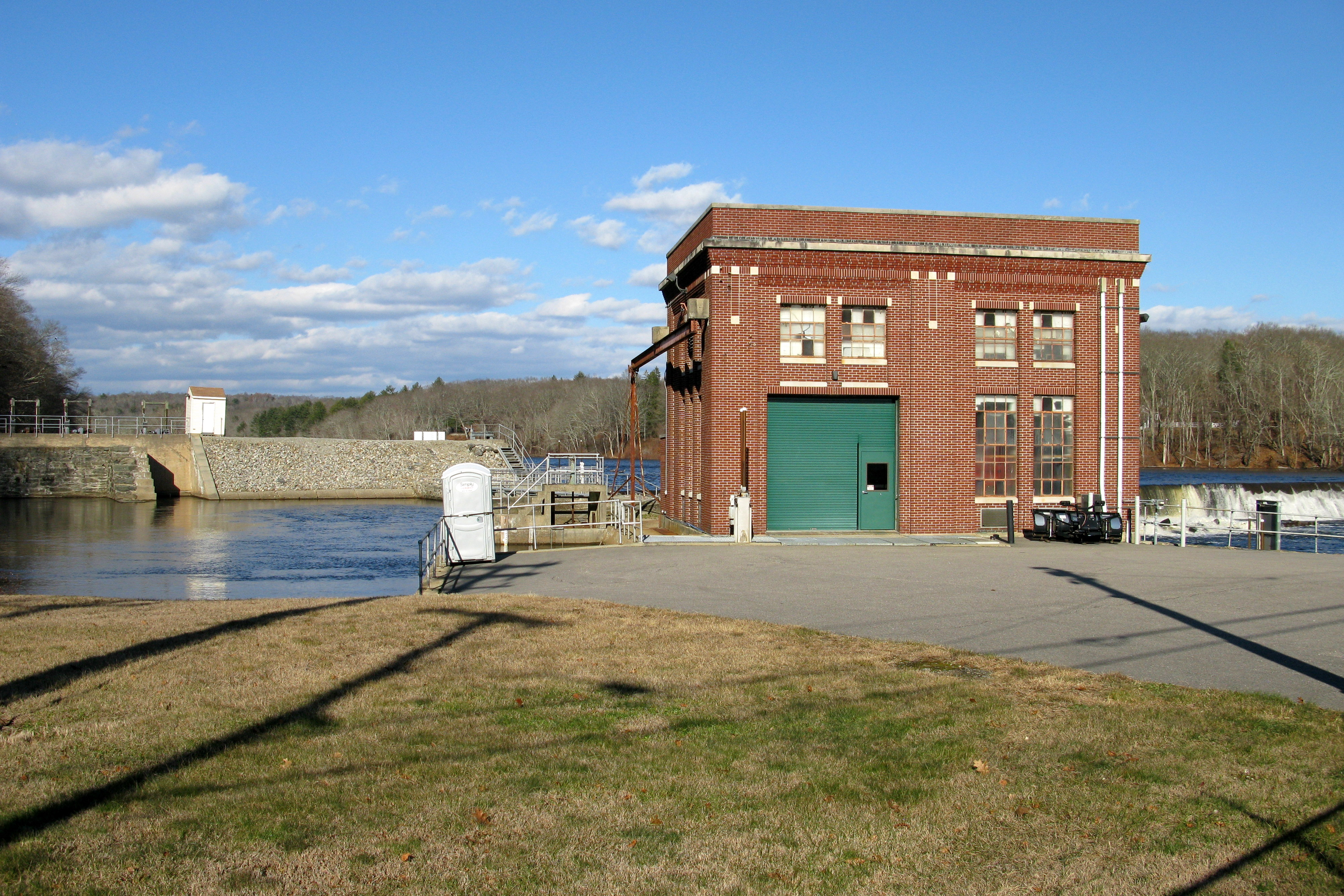
- The dam and powerhouse in 2025

- Location within Connecticut Location within the United States
- Location: North of Bridge Street, West Side of the Shetucket River, Norwich, Connecticut
- Coordinates: 41°35′49″N 72°3′1″W
- Area: 5 acres (2.0 ha)
- Built: 1865
- Architect: Potter, Henry T.; Chandler & Palmer
- NRHP reference No.: 96001459
- Added to NRHP: December 06, 1996

The Occum Hydroelectric Plant and Dam is a historic hydroelectric plant and dam North of Bridge Street on the West Side of the Shetucket River in Norwich, Connecticut. The facility includes a rare surviving partial example of a large-scale dam built for a textile mill in 1865, and an early example of a hydroelectric power generation facility established in 1934. It is one of a small number of surviving hydroelectric plants in the state which was built before 1940. The complex was listed on the National Register of Historic Places in 1996.

== Description and history ==
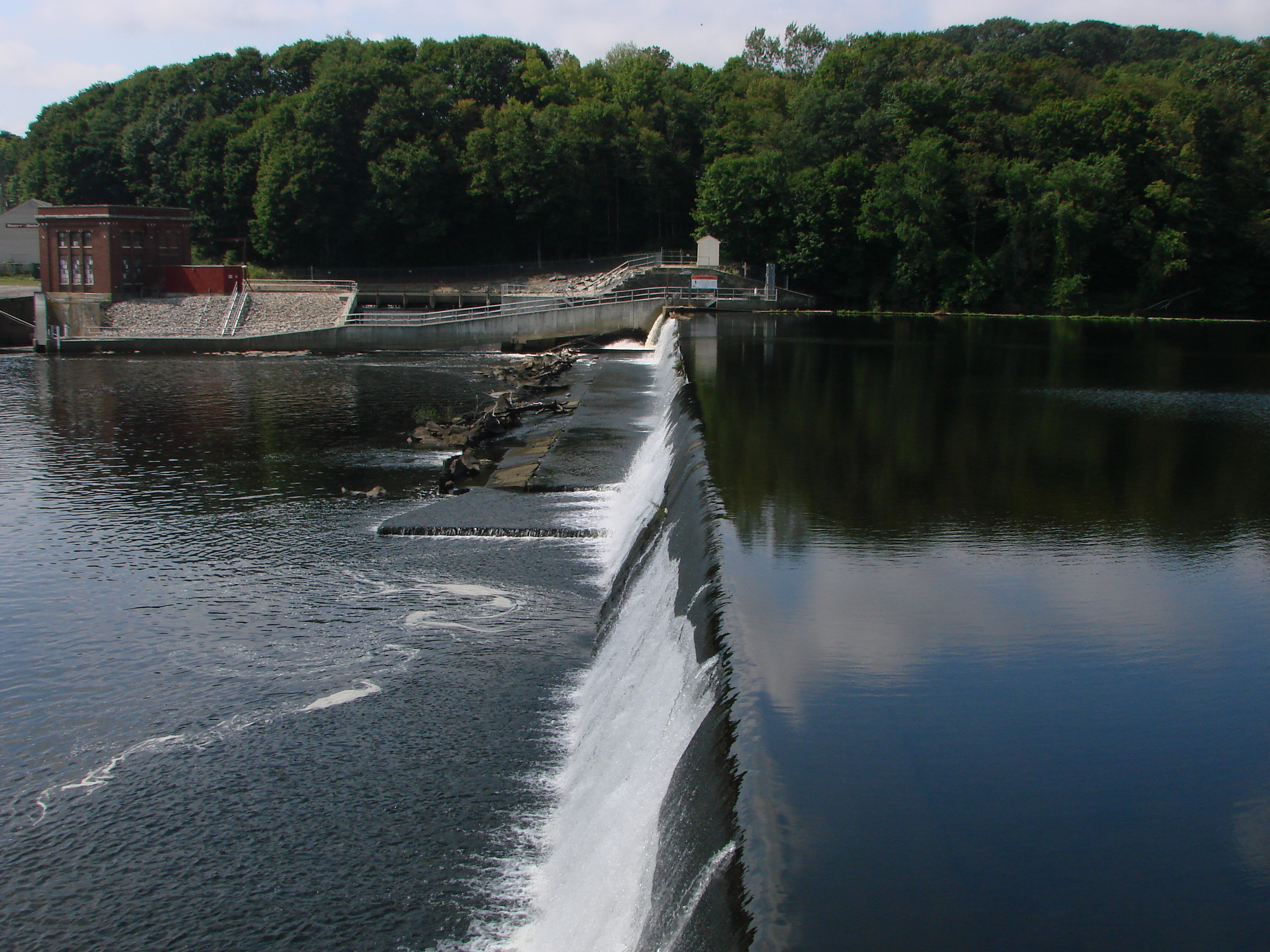
The dam in 2012

The Occum Hydroelectric Plant and Dam is located on the Shetucket River in northern Norwich and southern Sprague, just north of the Bridge Street bridge. The facilities include a dam, an intake structure on its western (Norwich) end, and a small brick powerhouse just below the intakes. The dam is a combination of granite and concrete construction, standing 14 feet high, and impounds a maximum of 600 acre-feet of water. The older portions of the dam are formed out of large granite blocks, now largely covered in gravel on the upstream side. About 280 feet (85 m) of the original 1865 dam survive (out of an original 300 feet (91 m)), and the dam is now 450 feet (140 m) long, the balance a concrete extension built in the wake of flooding attending the New England Hurricane of 1938. The headgates and intake structures are, like the dam, a combination of older and newer components. The brick powerhouse was built in 1934.

The dam was built in 1865 as part of a plan to provide water power to downstream textile mills. It originally had intake structures on both the Norwich and Sprague sides, and provided power to mills on both sides of the river. A mill operated on the Norwich (Occum) side of the river until 1980. The city of Norwich acquired the dam and water rights in 1934, converting it to hydroelectric generation at that time. After the dam was extensively damaged in the 1938 floods, its eastern end was rebuilt in concrete. The power station is a late example of early hydroelectric power stations, and is one of the only ones of that age left in the state.

== See also ==
- National Register of Historic Places listings in New London County, Connecticut
