= Conning Towers Nautilus Park, Connecticut =

Census-designated place in Connecticut, United States

Conning Towers Nautilus Park
- Census-designated place
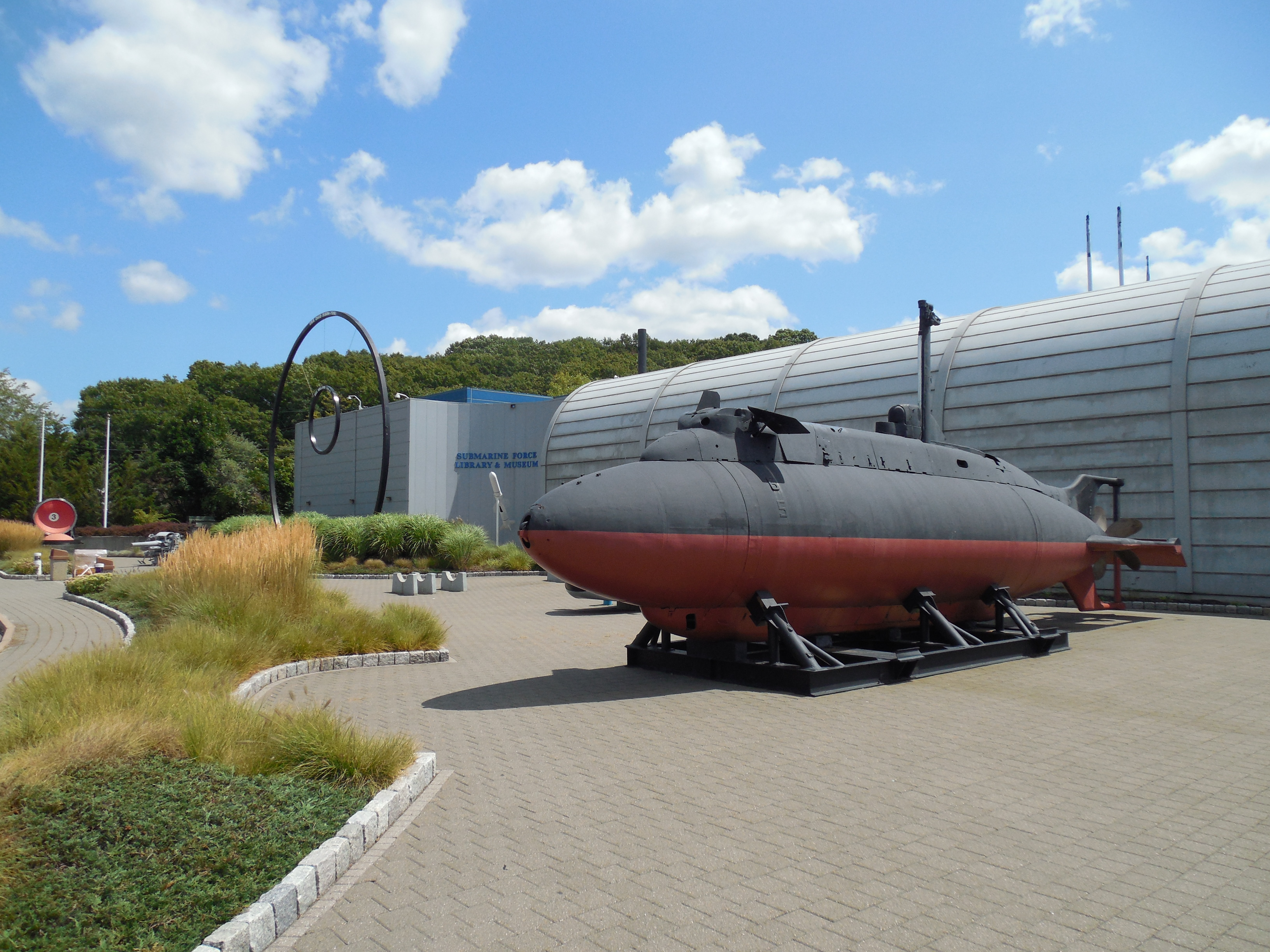
- Submarine Force Library and Museum

- Location in New London County, Connecticut
- Coordinates: 41°22′59″N 72°04′22″W
- Country: United States
- State: Connecticut
- County: New London
- Town: Groton

Area
  - Total: 5.6 sq mi (14.5 km^{2})
  - Land: 5.0 sq mi (12.9 km^{2})
  - Water: 0.62 sq mi (1.6 km^{2})
- Elevation: 180 ft (55 m)

Population (2010)
  - Total: 9,828
  - Density: 1,970/sq mi (762/km^{2})
- Time zone: UTC−5 (Eastern (EST))
  - Summer (DST): UTC−4 (EDT)
- ZIP code: 06340
- Area code: 860
- FIPS code: 09-16960
- GNIS feature ID: 2377810

Conning Towers Nautilus Park is a census-designated place (CDP) in the town of Groton in New London County, Connecticut, United States. The population was 9,828 at the 2010 census. (Note: The population was revised from 8,834 following a Count Question Resolution procedure.) The statistical area consists of the portion of the town in the vicinity of Route 12 and includes Naval Submarine Base New London.

== Geography ==
According to the United States Census Bureau, the CDP has a total area of 14.5 km^{2} (5.6 mi^{2}), of which 12.9 km^{2} (5.0 mi^{2}) is land and 1.6 km^{2} (0.6 mi^{2}) (10.91%) is water.

== Demographics ==
As of the census of 2000, there were 10,241 people, 2,660 households, and 2,420 families residing in the CDP. The population density was 794.0/km^{2} (2,055.1/mi^{2}). There were 2,822 housing units at an average density of 218.8/km^{2} (566.3/mi^{2}). The racial makeup of the CDP was 81.31% White, 9.62% African American, 0.57% Native American, 2.32% Asian, 0.32% Pacific Islander, 2.29% from other races, and 3.56% from two or more races. Hispanic or Latino of any race were 6.20% of the population.

There were 2,660 households, out of which 67.2% had children under the age of 18 living with them, 83.5% were married couples living together, 5.6% had a female householder with no husband present, and 9.0% were non-families. 7.1% of all households were made up of individuals, and 1.8% had someone living alone who was 65 years of age or older. The average household size was 3.30 and the average family size was 3.45.

In the CDP, the population was spread out, with 34.4% under the age of 18, 19.4% from 18 to 24, 38.5% from 25 to 44, 4.2% from 45 to 64, and 3.5% who were 65 years of age or older. The median age was 24 years. For every 100 females, there were 124.2 males. For every 100 females age 18 and over, there were 136.9 males.

The median income for a household in the CDP was $40,033, and the median income for a family was $38,043. Males had a median income of $29,297 versus $25,280 for females. The per capita income for the CDP was $14,216. About 4.1% of families and 4.7% of the population were below the poverty line, including 5.7% of those under age 18 and 6.2% of those age 65 or over.

== Education ==
The census-designated place, along with the rest of Groton Town, is in the Groton School District.
