= Salt Rock State Campground =

Park in Connecticut, United States

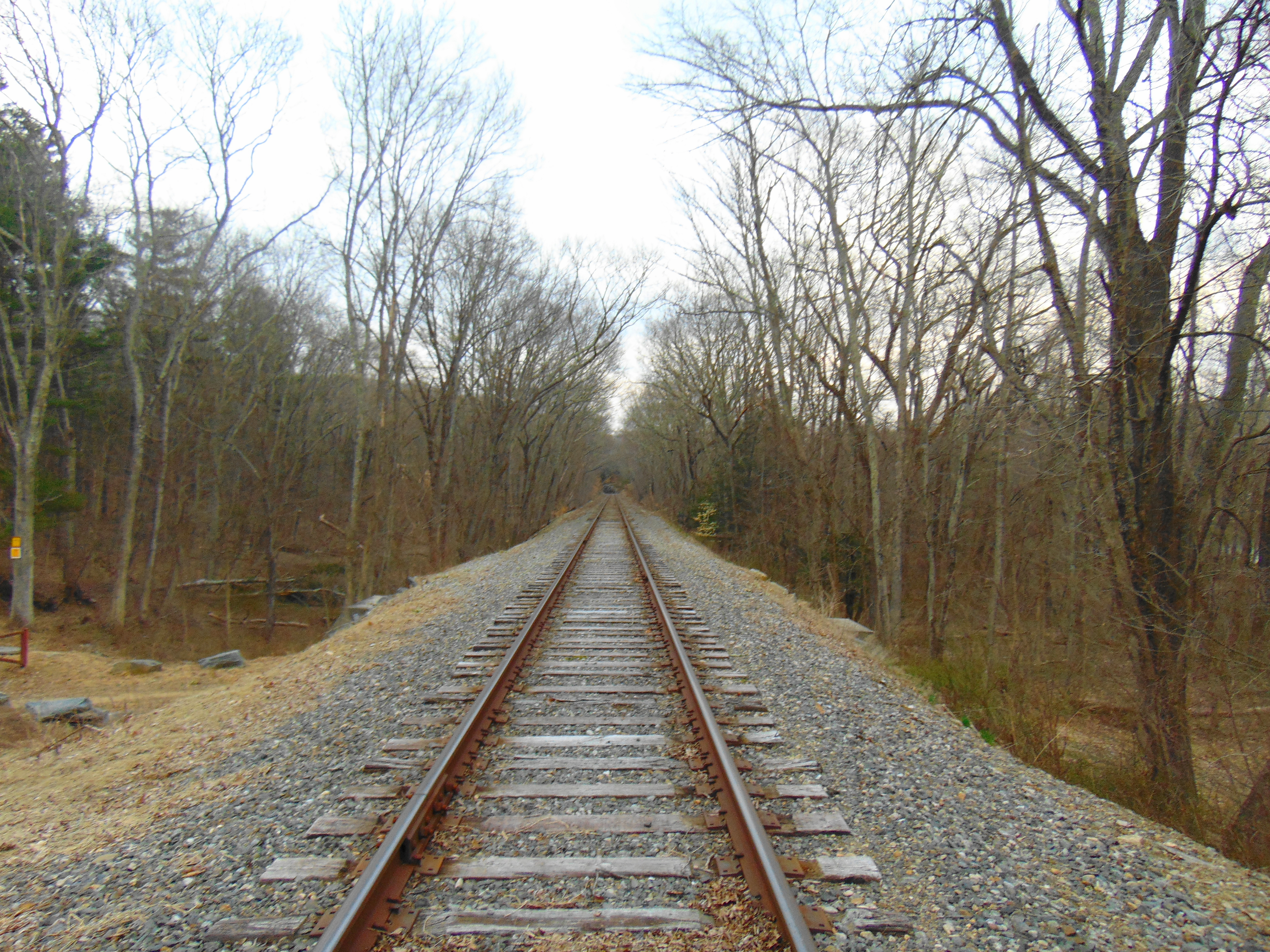
- Providence and Worcester Railroad line within Salt Rock State Campground

- Location within Connecticut Location within the United States
- Location: Sprague, Connecticut, United States
- Coordinates: 41°38′15″N 72°05′35″W
- Area: 149 acres (60 ha)
- Established: 2001
- Administrator: Connecticut Department of Energy and Environmental Protection
- Designation: Connecticut state park
- Website: Official website

Salt Rock State Campground is a public recreation area that preserves one mile (1.6 km) of wooded riverfront along the Shetucket River in the town of Sprague, Connecticut. In 2001, the state purchased the 149-acre (60 ha) campground for US$750,000 from Dwight and Jean Lathrop, whose "sensitive stewardship" of the property as its previous owners was recognized in the press. The state park offers RV and tent camping sites and river fishing. (Note: The state curtailed camping services in 2016, reinstating them in 2018.)
