= Baltic, Connecticut =

Census-designated place in Connecticut, United States

- Baltic Historic District
- U.S. National Register of Historic Places
- U.S. Historic district
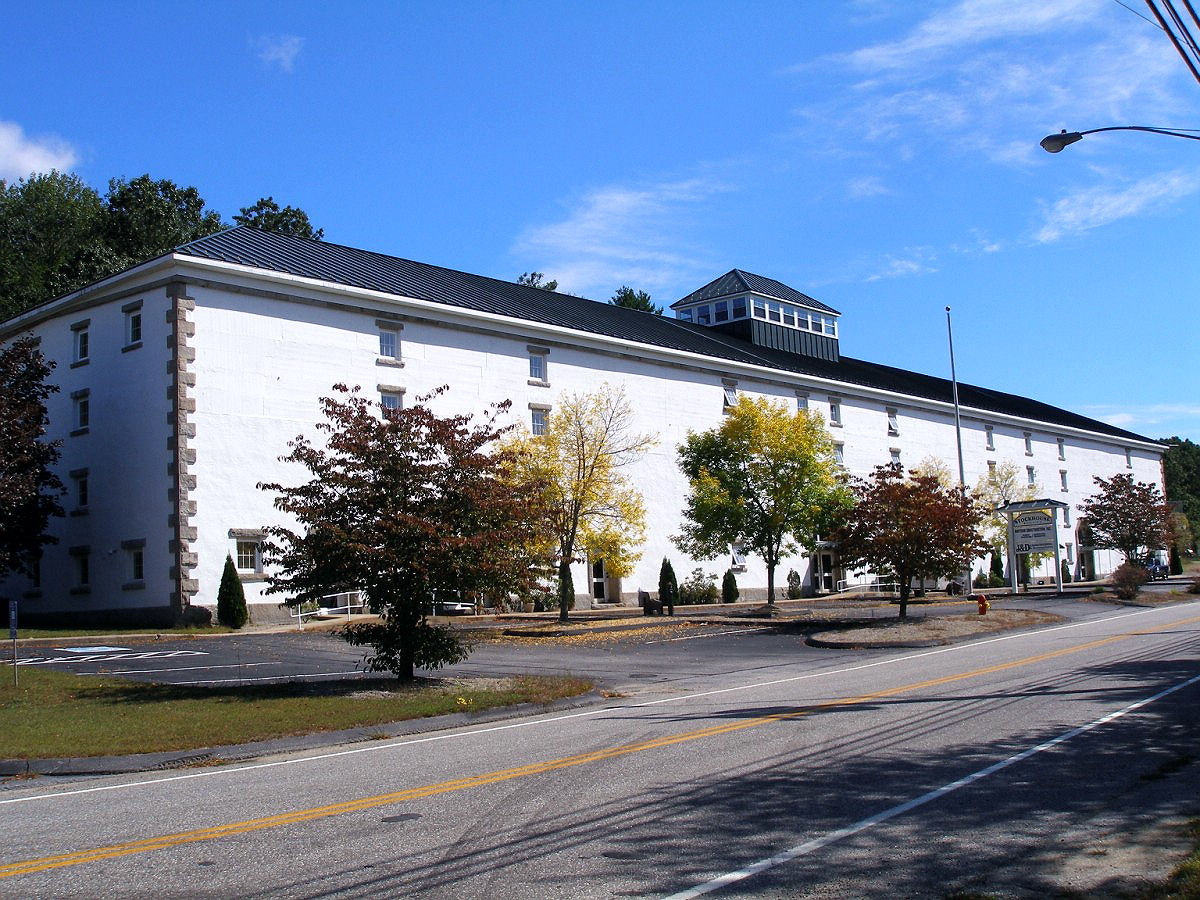
- Former Baltic Mill Warehouse

- Location within Connecticut Location within the United States
- Location: Roughly bounded by Fifth Avenue, River Street, High Street, Main Street, West Main Street, and the Shetucket River, Sprague, Connecticut
- Coordinates: 41°37′2″N 72°5′6″W
- Area: 122 acres (49 ha)
- Architectural style: Greek Revival, Late Victorian, Queen Anne
- NRHP reference No.: 87001247
- Added to NRHP: August 3, 1987

Baltic is the town center village of the town of Sprague, Connecticut, United States, and a census-designated place (CDP). As of the 2020 census, Baltic had a population of 1,186. The Sprague town hall is in Baltic. The Baltic Historic District is a historic district that was listed on the National Register of Historic Places in 1987, encompassing virtually the entire extent of the village.

== History ==
Baltic was formed around a cotton mill established on the Shetucket River on land purchased in 1856 by former Rhode Island Governor and Senator William Sprague III. The A. & W. Sprague Manufacturing Co. mill burned down in 1887, and Frederick Sayles of Pawtucket, Rhode Island purchased the site. He built the Baltic Mills Co. cotton mill which opened in 1899. The company operated until 1963, when the mill was sold to a syndicate from New York. The mill continued operating until 1967, when it was closed and the property and equipment were sold. In 1970, the property was sold to the Casper Division of Bevis Industries, which used it for a mail order operation.

The historic district includes 210 contributing structures over a 122-acre (49 ha) area.

In August 1999, the remains of the mill were destroyed by fire. There was only one building that survived, although it was also critically damaged. The fire was set by three local boys. The mill suffered another fire on April 23, 2018. Fire officials said that hot sparks hit debris from citing pipes, likely sparking the flames of the fire.

== Demographics ==
=== 2020 census ===
As of the 2020 census, Baltic had a population of 1,186. The median age was 38.5 years. 23.3% of residents were under the age of 18 and 10.8% of residents were 65 years of age or older. For every 100 females there were 108.8 males, and for every 100 females age 18 and over there were 104.5 males age 18 and over.

81.5% of residents lived in urban areas, while 18.5% lived in rural areas.

There were 468 households in Baltic, of which 33.1% had children under the age of 18 living in them. Of all households, 42.7% were married-couple households, 19.4% were households with a male householder and no spouse or partner present, and 28.8% were households with a female householder and no spouse or partner present. About 26.0% of all households were made up of individuals and 10.0% had someone living alone who was 65 years of age or older.

There were 542 housing units, of which 13.7% were vacant. The homeowner vacancy rate was 6.0% and the rental vacancy rate was 6.7%.

Racial composition as of the 2020 census
Race	Number	Percent
White	913	77.0%
Black or African American	57	4.8%
American Indian and Alaska Native	14	1.2%
Asian	38	3.2%
Native Hawaiian and Other Pacific Islander	3	0.3%
Some other race	37	3.1%
Two or more races	124	10.5%
Hispanic or Latino (of any race)	95	8.0%

=== 2010 census ===
As of the 2010 census, the Baltic CDP had a population of 1,250. The racial composition of Baltic was 81.0% white, 3.7% black or African American, 1.6% Native American, 2.6% Asian, 0.1% Pacific Islander, 5.4% from some other race and 5.7% from two or more races. 8.7% of the population was Hispanic or Latino of any race.

== Events ==
Baltic is the site of a monthly Sprague River Run on the Shetucket River from April to October, which includes tubing and activities for children and adults.

== Education ==
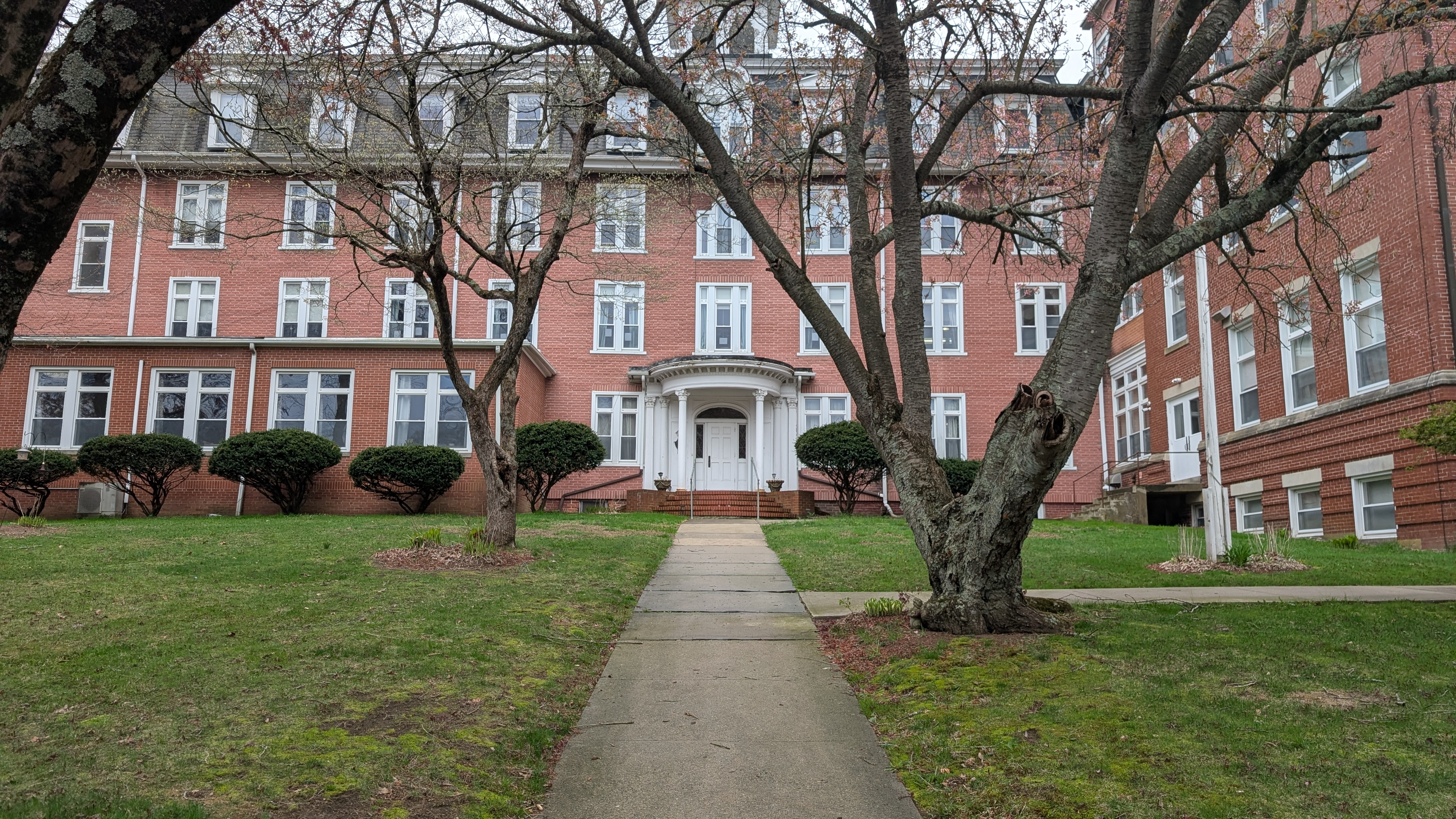
Front of Academy of the Holy Family

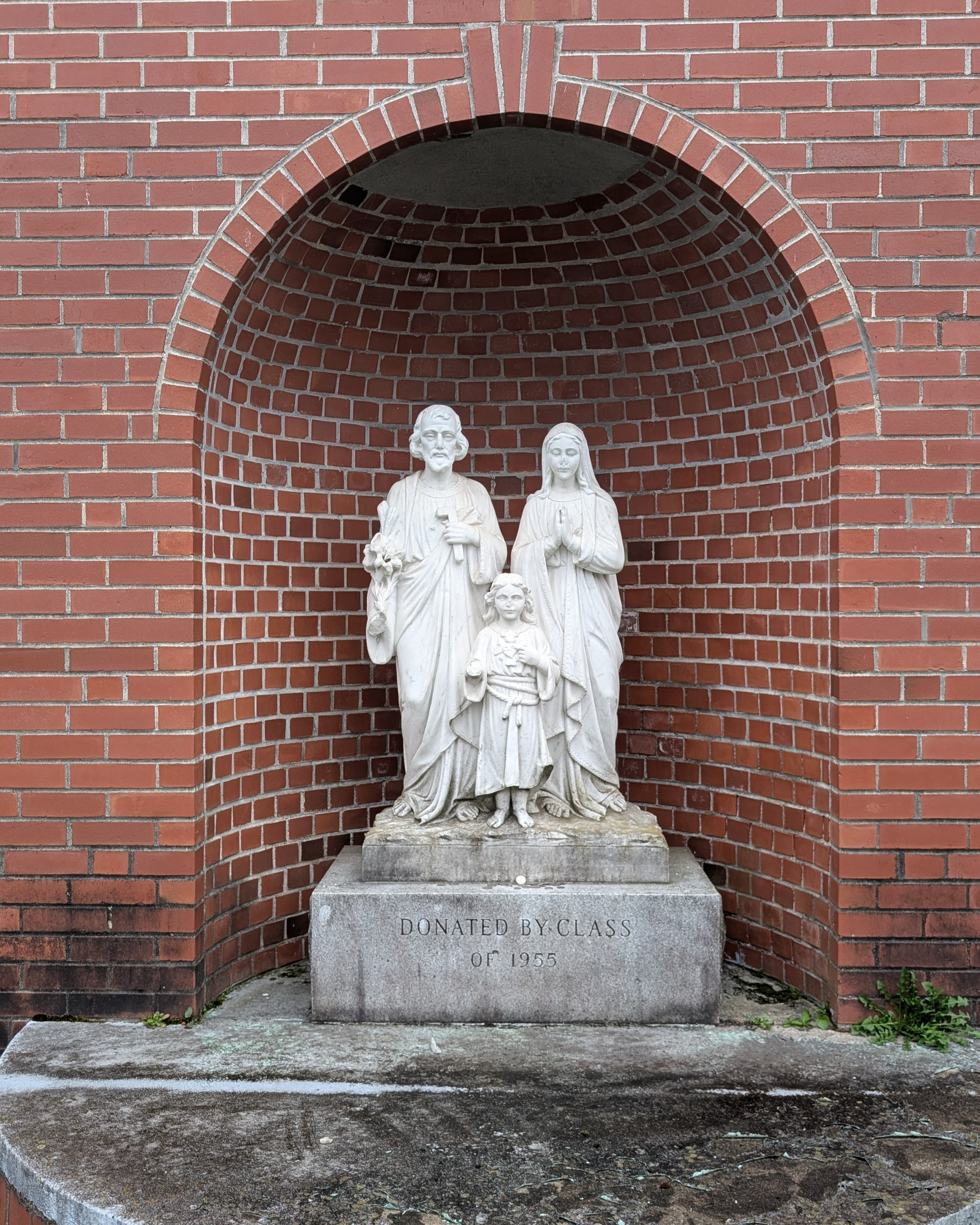
Statue of the Holy Family at the Academy of the Holy Family

The Academy of the Holy Family is private Catholic all-girls college preparatory school in town. It is run by the Sisters of Charity of Our Lady Mother of Mercy.

== See also ==
- National Register of Historic Places listings in New London County, Connecticut
