= Greeneville (Norwich, Connecticut) =

- Greeneville Historic District
- U.S. National Register of Historic Places
- U.S. Historic district
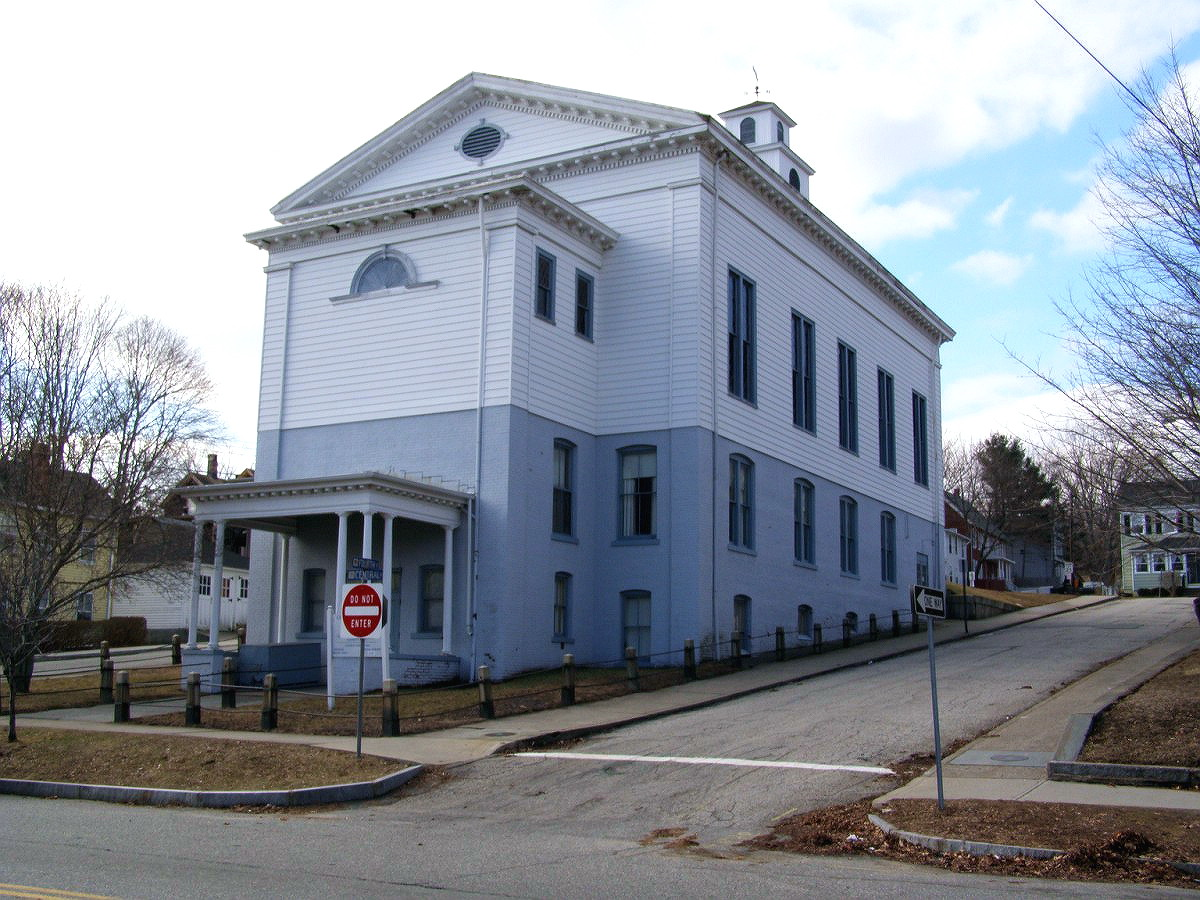
- Greeneville Congregational Church

- Location within Connecticut Location within the United States
- Location: Roughly along Boswell and Central Avenues, Prospect and North Main Streets, between Hickory and 14th Streets, Norwich, Connecticut
- Coordinates: 41°32′5″N 72°3′31″W
- Area: 300 acres (120 ha)
- Architectural style: Greek Revival, Gothic, et al.
- NRHP reference No.: 05001047
- Added to NRHP: September 21, 2005

Greeneville is a neighborhood of the city of Norwich, Connecticut, United States, located northeast of Downtown Norwich along the West Bank of the Shetucket River. Most of the neighborhood is designated Greeneville Historic District, a historic district that is listed on the National Register of Historic Places.

The district was listed on the National Register in 2005 and includes 683 contributing buildings, seven other contributing structures, and one other contributing site over a 300 acres (120 ha) area.

The district is drawn to "correspond to the village as it was laid out in 1833, but also include additional streets laid out and developed in the late nineteenth and early twentieth centuries to accommodate population growth. Areas north and south of the district boundaries were excluded...." as those areas included undeveloped land, or fewer contributing relative to non-contributing buildings, or reflected a "shift in architectural character."

According to the Connecticut Trust for Historic Preservation the district "is a historically significant industrial village that was created to support and sustain water-powered industry from 1828 to about 1940. Much of the enduring success of this industrial enterprise can be attributed to the entrepreneurial vision of industrialist William P. Greene (1795–1862). His development of this planned community and a company to deliver a centralized power system, combined with significant technological infrastructure improvements in the late 19th century, supported the largest industrial presence in Norwich. Although nominally a part of the City of Norwich after 1875, from its creation in 1833 until after World War I Greeneville remained a relatively independent and self-sufficient, working-class community-an evolution fully expressed by the district's large, cohesive collection of generally well-preserved domestic, institutional and commercial architecture. While much of the architecture has the vernacular character expected in a mill town, the district also includes representative examples of the major styles of the period, including Greek Revival, Second Empire, Italianate, and Carpenter Gothic."

== See also ==
- Neighborhoods of Norwich, Connecticut
- National Register of Historic Places listings in New London County, Connecticut
