= Leo Connellan (poet) =

American poet (1928–2001)

- Born: November 28, 1928; Portland, Maine, U.S.
- Died: February 22, 2001 (aged 72); Sprague, Connecticut, U.S.
- Occupations: Beat Poet, Poet Laureate of Connecticut
- Writing career
- Notable awards: Shelly Memorial Award

Leo Connellan (November 30, 1928 – February 22, 2001) was an American poet of the Beat Generation born in Portland, Maine, who served as Connecticut's Poet Laureate from 1996 until his death in 2001.

== Life ==
Leo Connellan grew up in Rockland, Maine, attended the University of Maine and served in the U.S. Army. Mainly in the 1950s, when he was between the ages of 19 and 32, Connellan travelled the contiguous 48 states, going back and forth between New York City and California. At age 32, he married his wife Nancy, and took work as a salesman after his daughter Amy was born, moving his family to Connecticut in 1969 to take over a new sales territory in New England. He lived at the time of his death in Sprague, Connecticut. He was the uncle of Wall Street businessman Peter Connellan.

== Work as a poet ==
During the 1950s, Leo Connellan lived in Greenwich Village, Manhattan, which puts him in the Beat Generation of poets. Connellan's rough, "everyman" lyricism won him the admiration of such poet-critics as Karl Shapiro, Richard Eberhart, Richard Wilbur, and David B. Axelrod. Connellan won the Shelley Memorial Award from the Poetry Society of America and served as Connecticut's second Poet Laureate from 1996 until his death. His duties in this post were little defined, but Connellan said he saw promoting poetry in schools and supporting new writers as among his most important responsibilities. From 1987 until the time of his death, he was poet-in-residence for the Connecticut State University System. He was designated one of Maine's most prominent poets in the Maine Literary Hall of Fame.

Connellan took among his themes the fishing and lobstering industries in Maine, and the lives of New York commuters. His work featured in anthologies, including Wesley McNair's The Maine Poets: An Anthology of Verse, and the Curbstone Press's Poetry like bread anthology of "poets of the political imagination."

Cover of Crossing America, considered by many to be Connellan at his best.

== List of Publications ==
- The Maine Poems (1999)
- Short Poems, City Poems, 1944--1998 (1998)
- Provincetown and Other Poems (1995)
- New and Collected Poems (1989)
- The Clear Blue Lobster-Water Country: A Trilogy (1985)
- Shatterhouse (1983)
- Massachusetts Poems (1981)
- The Gunman and Other poems (1979)
- Death in Lobster Land: New Poems (1978)
- First Selected Poems (1976)
- Crossing America (1976)
- Another Poet in New York (1975)
- Penobscot Poems (1974)
