= Hanover, Connecticut =

Coordinates: 41.641°N 72.066°W

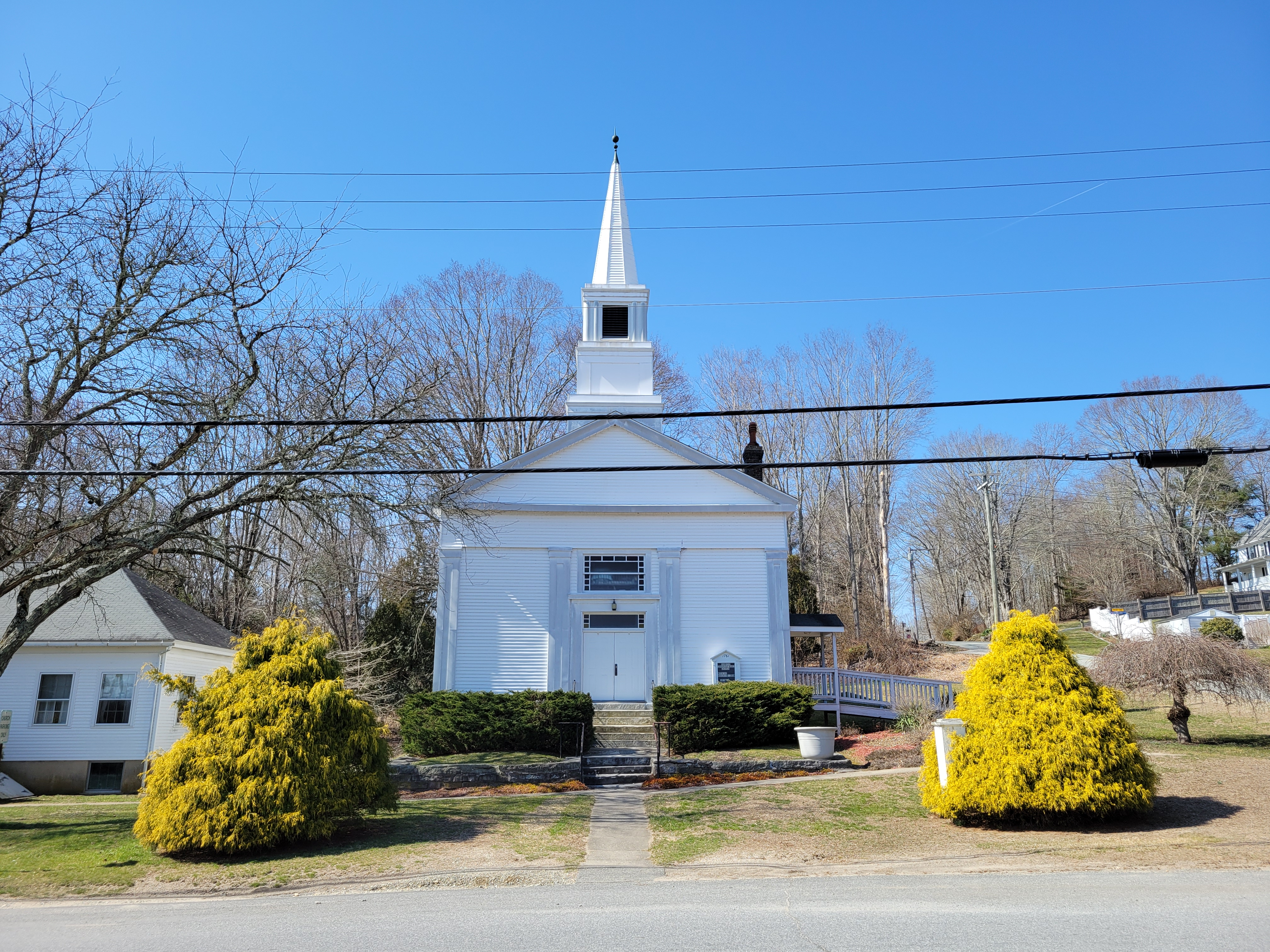
Hanover Congregational Church

Hanover (Connecticut)

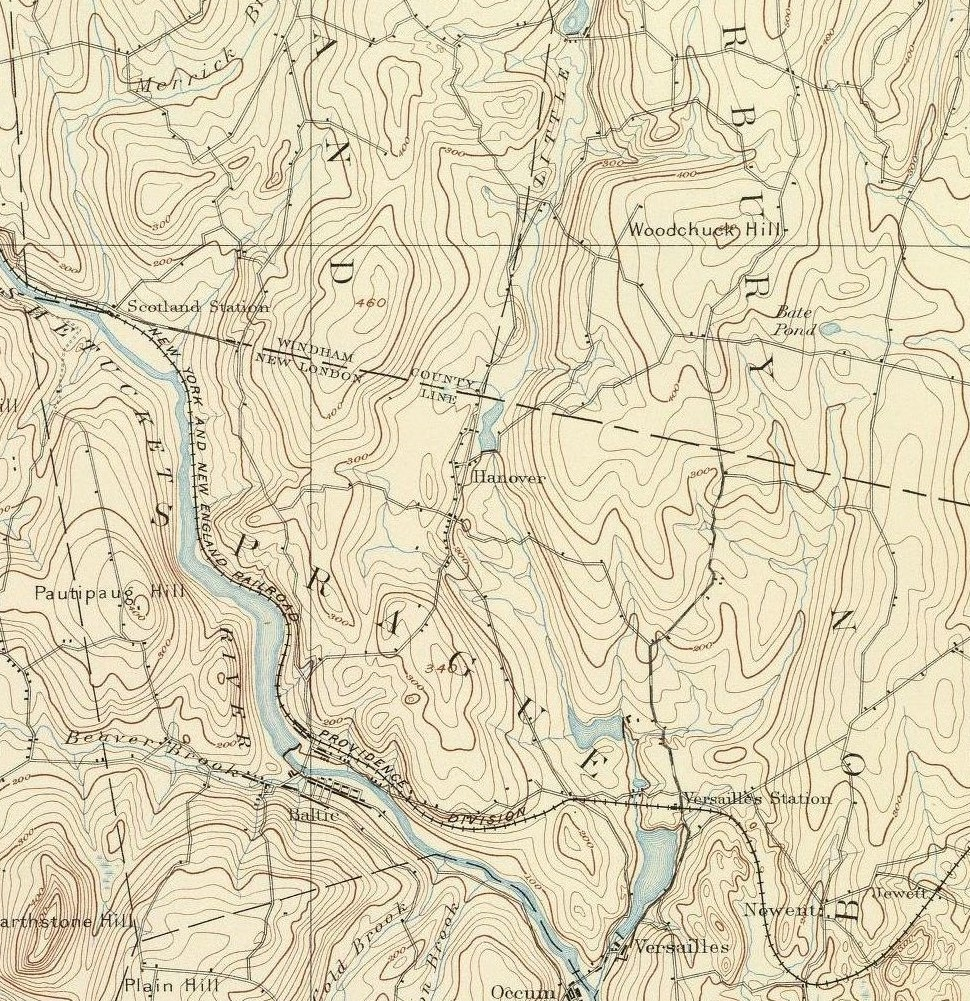
Map of Hanover, CT and surrounding areas

Hanover is a small community in Sprague inside New London County, Connecticut, United States. In the 2010 US Census the population was 67, but in 2014 the estimated population was 59. The main road, Hanover Rd., leads south to Route 138 and north to Route 14 in Scotland, while Salt Rock Rd. leads to Route 97. The Little River runs through the eastern part of the area. Hanover Reservoir is the largest body of water in the area. In the center of the village, some notably old houses are located there. Some are on the National Register of Historic Places. The ZIP Code for Hanover is 06350.

== History ==
Hanover is the oldest settlement in Sprague. In 1760, more than a century before the town of Sprague was established, the people of Hanover petitioned the General Assembly for permission to establish an ecclesiastical society. In 1761, the establishment was approved. In 1766, Hanover Congregational Church was organized. In 1768, Rev. Andrew Lee was named Pastor. His house still stands on “Lee’s Hill,” on Baltic-Hanover Rd. In 1786, the society was incorporated into the town of Lisbon, CT. In 1861, Hanover was made part of the new town of Sprague.

The Little River—originally called the Appaquag by the Mohegans of the area—has powered many mills—grist, saw, silk, wool, paper, rubber—the most prominent of which became the Allen Woolen Company. The mill was powered by water stored in Hanover Reservoir, which also provided household water to the village. The home of one of its early owners, Ethan Allen (named in honor of the Revolutionary War hero), still stands on Main St. in Hanover. Allen was chosen as the First Selectman of Sprague when it was established in 1861. In 1899, Angus Park took over the company, renaming it Airlie Mills. Upon his death in 1929, the company was run by his son, William G. Park and later by, Angus Park, grandson of the elder Angus. The mill burned in 1975 and was not rebuilt. The homes of the elder Angus and William still stand on Main St., just north of Ethan Allen's residence.

Notable residents of Hanover have included Rev. Andrew Lee, first Pastor of the Congregational Church; Ethan Allen, mill owner and first Sprague First Selectman; Angus Park, founder of Airlie Mills; Francis J. Foley; Conn. Superior Court Judge; Leo Connellan, State Poet Laureate; Lucy Baker, artist; Glenn Alan Cheney, writer and translator; and Carol Dunn, Warden, York Correctional Institution, and artist.
