= Shetucket River =

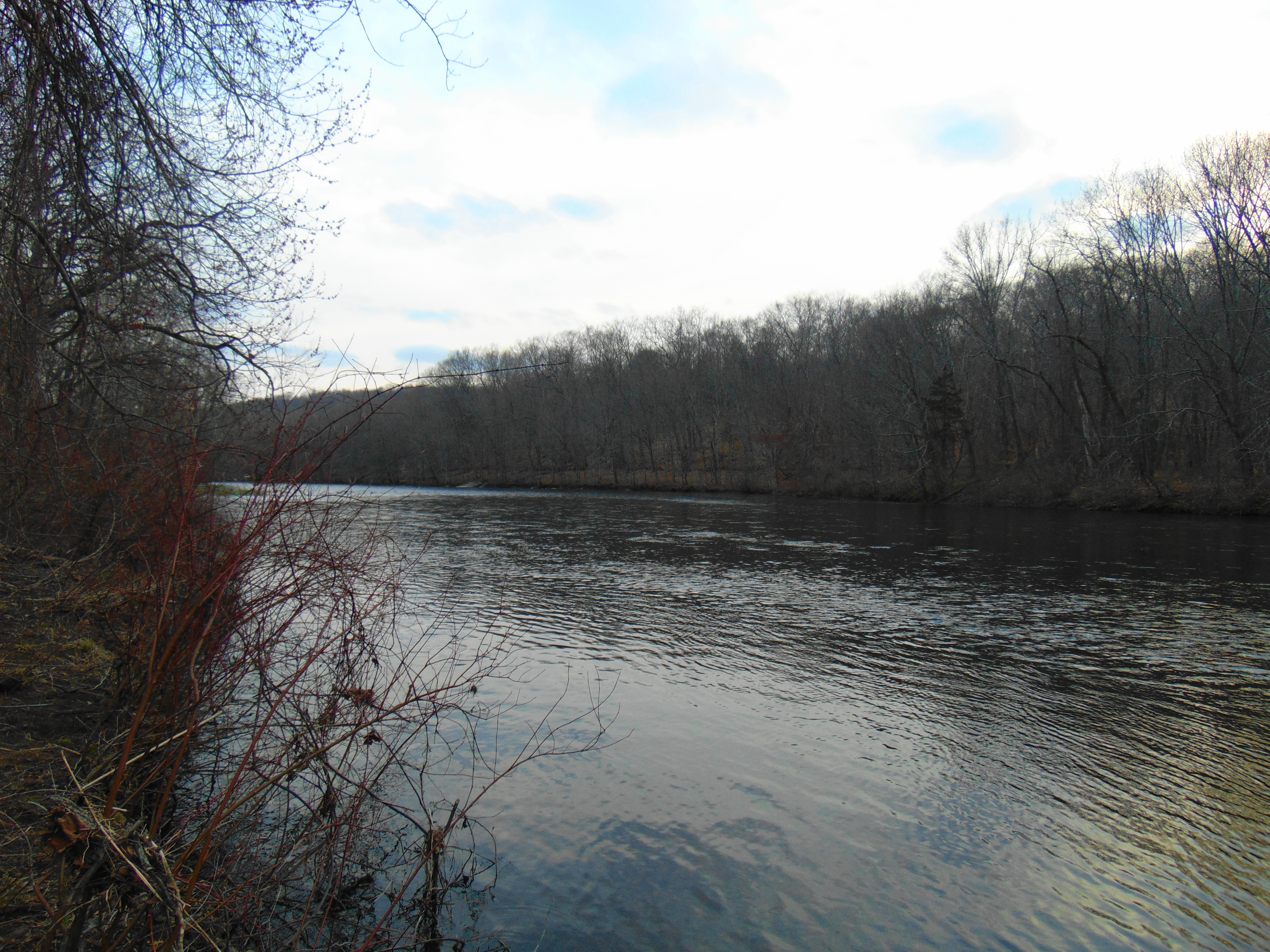
- The river at Salt Rock State Park in Sprague

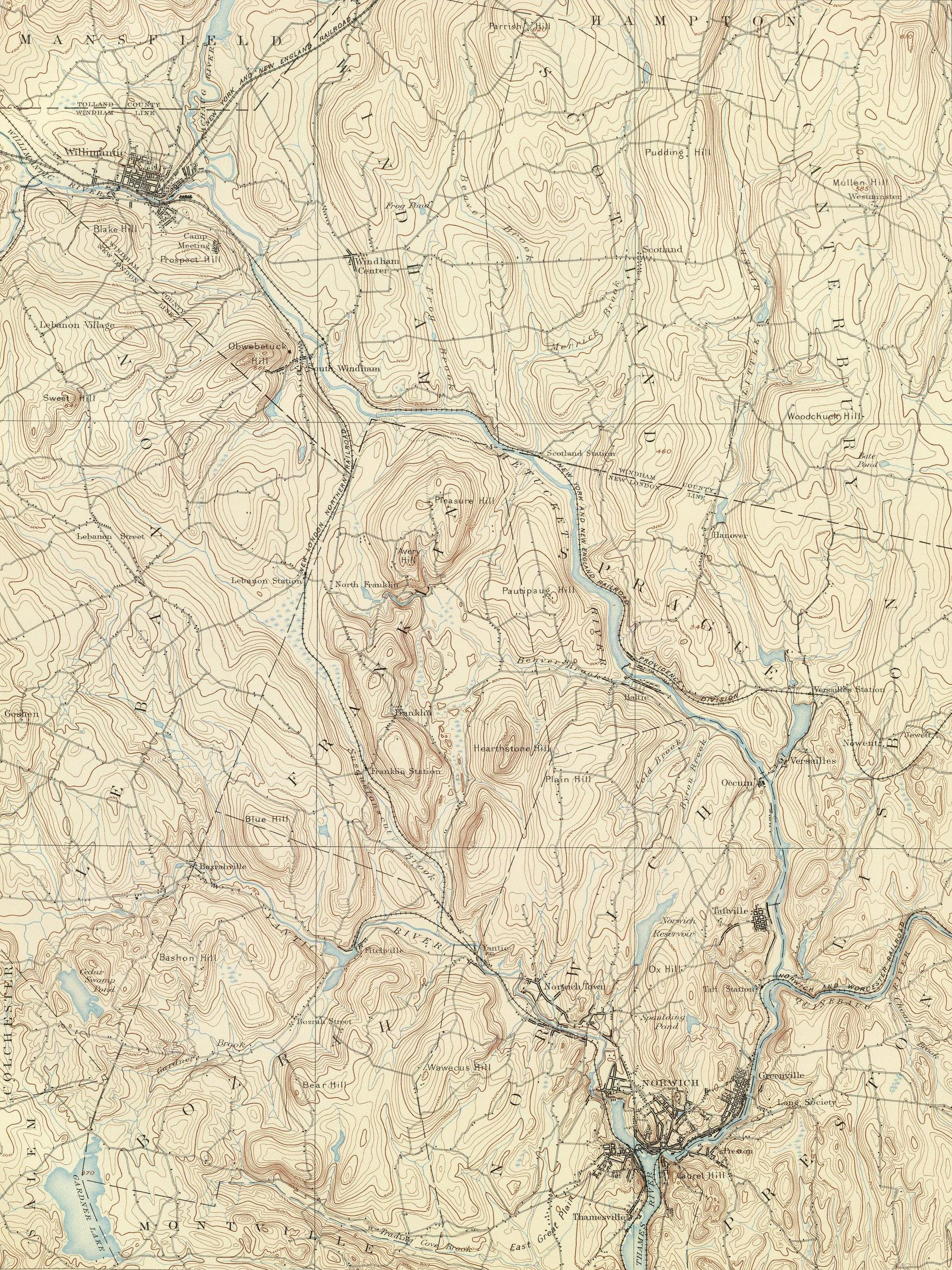
- Shetucket River and environs

Location
- Country: United States
- State: Connecticut
- Counties: Windham, New London

Physical characteristics
- Source: Confluence of Willimantic River and Natchaug River
  - location: Willimantic, Windham County, Connecticut, United States
  - coordinates: 41°42′46″N 72°11′31″W
- Mouth: Confluence with Yantic River to form Thames River
  - location: Norwich, New London County, Connecticut, United States
  - coordinates: 41°31′20″N 72°04′40″W
- Length: 20 mi (32 km)
- Discharge
  - location: Willimantic, CT
  - average: 718 cu ft/s (20.3 m^{3}/s)Average, 1929-2005
  - minimum: 337 cu ft/s (9.5 m^{3}/s)Annual mean, 1965
  - maximum: 1,243 cu ft/s (35.2 m^{3}/s)Annual mean, 1938

Basin features
- Tributaries
  - right: Quinebaug River, Little River (Shetucket River)

The Shetucket River is a tributary of the Thames River, 20.4 miles (32.8 km) long, in eastern Connecticut in the United States.

It is formed at Willimantic by the junction of the Willimantic and Natchaug rivers. It flows southeast and south. Approximately 4 miles (6 km) northeast of Norwich it receives the Quinebaug River and broadens into a wide estuary which stretches southeast for approximately 5 miles (8 km) and joins the Thames estuary on the south side of Norwich.

The river flows through a rural section of New England, despite the historical presence of industry in the surrounding region. Parts of the rivers have been designated by the federal government as the Quinebaug and Shetucket Rivers Valley National Heritage Corridor. The National Park Service describes the river valley as the "last green valley" in the Boston-to-Washington megalopolis. In nighttime satellite photos, the valley appears distinctively dark amidst the lights of the surrounding urban and suburban regions.

== Crossings ==
Carries	Location
Route 2	Norwich
Providence and Worcester Railroad	Norwich
Route 12/Route 2	Norwich
Route 2	Norwich
8th Street	Norwich
Providence and Worcester Railroad	Norwich/ Lisbon
Route 12	Norwich/ Lisbon
Route 169	Norwich/ Lisbon
Connecticut Turnpike	Norwich/ Lisbon
Bridge Street/Main Street	Norwich/ Sprague
Route 97	Sprague
Route 203	Windham
Providence and Worcester Railroad	Windham
Plains Road	Windham

== Environmental issues ==
The Shetucket River has been tested for the presence of PFAS following the June 8, 2019 incident that spilled thousands of gallons of firefighting foam in the Farmington River. Elevated levels of PFAS were found in bass collected in the Shetucket River, Natchaug River and the Willimantic River. As of 2023, the Connecticut Department of Energy & Environmental Protection still mentions a fish consumption advisory in effect for those three rivers.

== Paddling the River ==
The entire length of the river, as well as the lower part of the Natchaug River flowing into it, is a popular recreational paddling route. The water trail is designated as a National Recreation Trail.

Canoe/Kayak launch sites are located at the following locations:

- Lauter Park off Route 195 - Willimantic (on Natchaug River 1 mile above Shetucket River)
- Recreation Park on Plains Road - Windham
- Baltic Riverside Park on Route 97 - Sprague
- Occum Dam canoe portage - Sprague
- Lisbon Canoe Launch off Route 169 - Lisbon
- Greenville Dam canoe portage - Norwich
- Howard Brown Park - Norwich

Short, marked portages are required at four hydroelectric dams: Scotland Dam, Occum Dam, Taftville Dam, and Greenville Dam.

== See also ==
- List of Connecticut rivers
