= Sprague, Connecticut =

- Town
- Town of Sprague
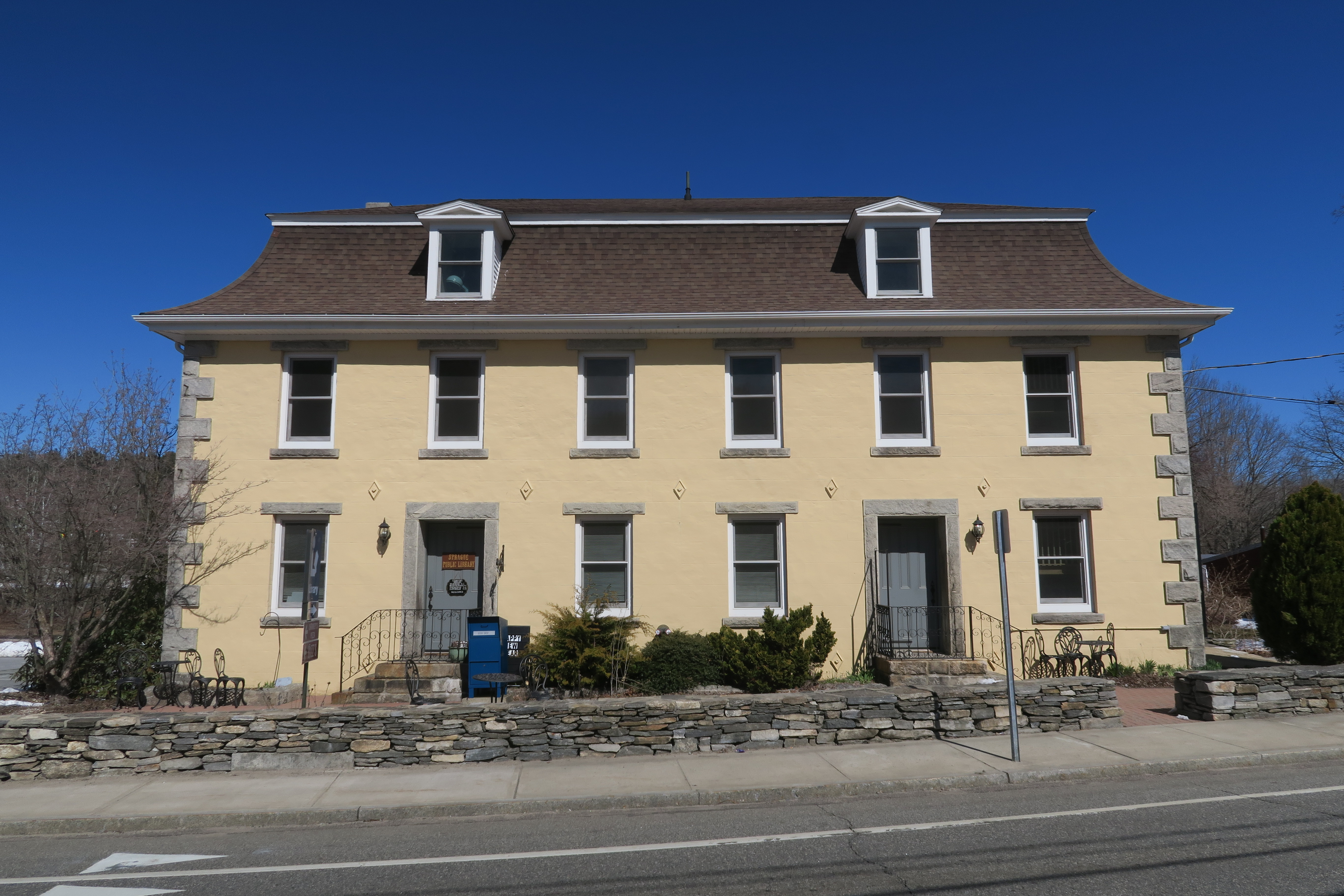
- Sprague Public Library

- Seal

- Coordinates: 41°37′26″N 72°04′30″W
- Country: United States
- U.S. state: Connecticut
- County: New London
- Region: Southeastern CT
- Incorporated: 1861

Government
  - Type: Selectman-town meeting
  - First selectman: Cheryl Blanchard (R)

Area
  - Total: 13.8 sq mi (35.7 km^{2})
  - Land: 13.2 sq mi (34.2 km^{2})
  - Water: 0.62 sq mi (1.6 km^{2})
- Elevation: 276 ft (84 m)

Population (2020)
  - Total: 2,967
  - Density: 225/sq mi (86.8/km^{2})
- Time zone: UTC-5 (Eastern)
  - Summer (DST): UTC-4 (Eastern)
- ZIP Codes: 06330, 06350, 06383
- Area codes: 860/959
- FIPS code: 09-71670
- GNIS feature ID: 0213510
- Website: www.ctsprague.org

Sprague is a town in New London County, Connecticut, United States. The town is part of the Southeastern Connecticut Planning Region. The town was named after William Sprague III, who laid out the industrial section. The population was 2,967 at the 2020 census. Sprague includes three villages: Baltic, Hanover, and Versailles.

== History ==
The town of Sprague was incorporated in 1861, formed from portions of the towns of Lisbon and Franklin. A few years earlier, in 1856, former Rhode Island Governor and U.S. Senator William Sprague III of Rhode Island had laid out plans to build "the largest mill on the Western Continent" in eastern Connecticut, only to die later that year. His nephews William and Amasa Sprague constructed the Baltic Cotton Mill in what was to become the village of Baltic. The mill village of Baltic sat on the Shetucket River in the southwest corner of the town. The original mill burned down in 1877, but the Baltic Power Company continued to operate a mill on the site until 1967.

== Geography ==
According to the United States Census Bureau, the town has a total area of 13.8 square miles (35.8 km^{2}), of which 13.2 square miles (34.2 km^{2}) is land and 0.6 square miles (1.6 km^{2}), or 4.41%, is water.

=== Principal communities ===
- Baltic (town center)
- Hanover
- Versailles

The town hall is located in Baltic and was constructed in the 1950s.

== Demographics ==
Historical population
Census	Pop.	Note	%±
1870	3,463		—
1880	3,207		−7.4%
1890	1,106		−65.5%
1900	1,339		21.1%
1910	2,551		90.5%
1920	2,500		−2.0%
1930	2,539		1.6%
1940	2,285		−10.0%
1950	2,320		1.5%
1960	2,509		8.1%
1970	2,912		16.1%
1980	2,996		2.9%
1990	3,008		0.4%
2000	2,971		−1.2%
2010	2,984		0.4%
2020	2,967		−0.6%
U.S. Decennial Census

As of the census of 2000, there were 2,971 people, 1,111 households, and 797 families living in the town. The population density was 224.8 inhabitants per square mile (86.8/km^{2}). There were 1,164 housing units at an average density of 88.1 per square mile (34.0/km^{2}). The racial makeup of the town was 95.42% White, 0.71% African American, 0.64% Native American, 1.35% Asian, 0.07% Pacific Islander, 0.37% from other races, and 1.45% from two or more races. Hispanic or Latino of any race were 1.11% of the population.

There were 1,111 households, out of which 36.5% had children under the age of 18 living with them, 54.2% were married couples living together, 12.2% had a female householder with no husband present, and 28.2% were non-families. 21.2% of all households were made up of individuals, and 8.8% had someone living alone who was 65 years of age or older. The average household size was 2.63 and the average family size was 3.04.

In the town, the population was spread out, with 26.0% under the age of 18, 6.6% from 18 to 24, 32.3% from 25 to 44, 23.4% from 45 to 64, and 11.7% who were 65 years of age or older. The median age was 37 years. For every 100 females, there were 93.0 males. For every 100 females age 18 and over, there were 93.2 males.

The median income for a household in the town was $43,125, and the median income for a family was $57,500. Males had a median income of $40,808 versus $28,616 for females. The per capita income for the town was $20,796. About 2.2% of families and 6.4% of the population were below the poverty line, including 5.1% of those under age 18 and 17.8% of those age 65 or over.

== Economy ==
The previous industry in town was the Baltic Textile Mill, which burned down in 1999.

=== Ecotourism and events ===
Sprague is quickly becoming a destination for eco-tourism, having held their first RiverFest, a celebration of the local Shetucket River. The river and festival attract kayakers, canoe enthusiasts, tubers, and nature lovers. A companion festival, the Three Villages Festival, is held each year in October in Baltic, on the public ball field and surrounding area.

== Notable people ==
- Leo Connellan (1928–2001), poet laureate of Connecticut (1996-2001), lived his later years here and died in town
- Charles S. Whitman (1868–1947), judge and the 41st Governor of New York, born in town
- Chase Going Woodhouse (1890–1984), feminist leader, suffragist, educator, U.S. Representative

== On the National Register of Historic Places ==
A historic district and two individual buildings in Sprague are listed on the National Register of Historic Places:

- Ashlawn – 1 Potash Hill Road (added July 4, 1979)
- Baltic Historic District – Roughly bounded by Fifth Avenue, River, High, Main, West Main, and the Shetucket River (added September 3, 1987)
- William Park House – 330 Main Street (added March 7, 2007)
