= Quiet Corner =

Rural region in Connecticut, US

Coordinates: 41°54′N 71°52′W

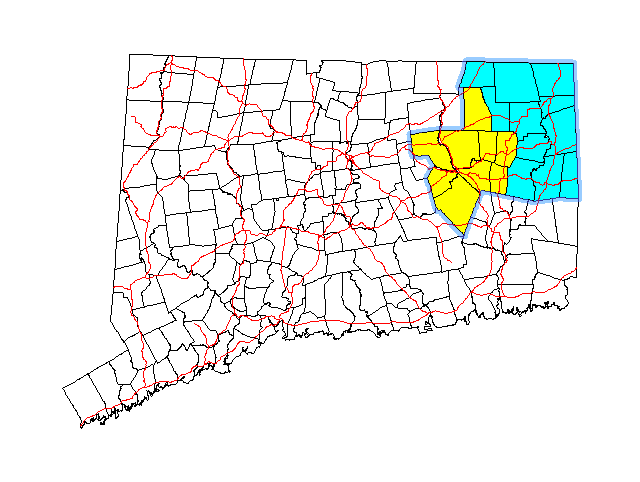
Map of Connecticut, showing the Northeastern Connecticut region (in blue) and disputed towns (in yellow)

Northeastern Connecticut, dubbed the Quiet Corner in 1985, is a historic region of the state of Connecticut, located in the northeastern corner of the state. No official definition exists; the term is generally associated with Windham County, but also sometimes incorporates eastern sections of Tolland County and the northern portion of New London County.

== History ==
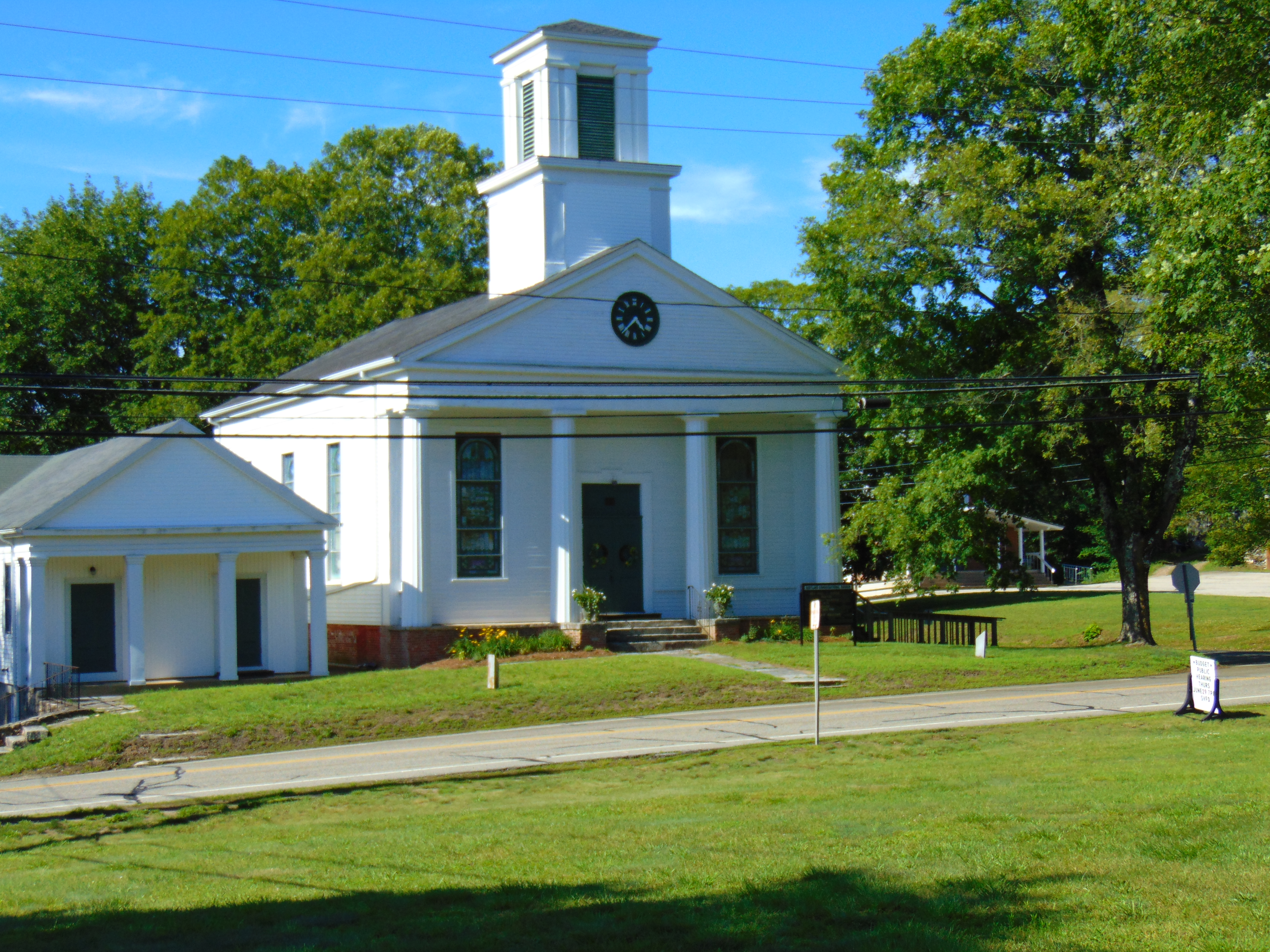
The town center for Scotland, Connecticut, an example of one of the small towns in the Quiet Corner

In 1985, the Northeast-Windham Area Convention and Visitors District was established as the state of Connecticut's 19th official tourism bureau. Its full-time staff replaced volunteers who had been previously working to attract visitors to 18 towns in the northwestern part of the state. The organization soon sought a less formal name, and in May chose "Connecticut's Quiet Corner," suggested by Darrell Christopher May of East Woodstock, who received $100.

== Description ==
The Quiet Corner's identity has much to do with its lack of direct association to the state's major cities and towns such as Hartford, Norwich, or Manchester. Some say its western boundary is the semi-rural town of Coventry, which is more rustic than the more suburban towns to the west. Some say the region includes the towns of Ashford, Mansfield, and/or Willington in the west, Plainfield in the south, the Massachusetts border in the north, and the Rhode Island border in the east. Others draw the western boundary at Route 198 or Route 89 and the southern boundary at Route 14.

The core of today's Quiet Corner encompasses the towns of Pomfret, Killingly, Putnam, Woodstock, Brooklyn, Thompson, Eastford, Hampton, Chaplin, Plainfield, Canterbury, Sterling, and Scotland. Under some definitions of the Quiet Corner, the region's largest town is Windham, including the borough of Willimantic, with a population of 25,000. If the Willimantic and Windham area is excluded due to its population, urbanized setting, and location at the extreme southwestern corner of Windham County, then the largest town is Killingly, with a population of nearly 18,000.

Northeastern Connecticut is more rural than the rest of the state, with large swaths of scenic farmland, rivers and lakes, woodlands, and state forests. Its population centers are largely rural and semi-rural historic towns (many founded during the American Colonial Era), and most with populations below 10,000. It is one of the least-urbanized districts along the Northeast Megalopolis. The region is considered a core part of the Last Green Valley National Heritage Corridor, a source of pride and identity that many residents of the area seek to preserve.

Many of the towns are within a long commuting distance of Boston, although none are considered a part of the Boston Metropolitan Area. Only Interstate 395 passes through the heart of the Quiet Corner, linking the area to Worcester, Massachusetts (and by extension the Massachusetts Turnpike) and the Connecticut Shoreline. Interstate 84 passes near the western periphery of the region, providing a link with Hartford and the rest of the state. Route 44 and Route 6 provide local residents relatively straightforward east-west transit to Hartford and Providence, Rhode Island.

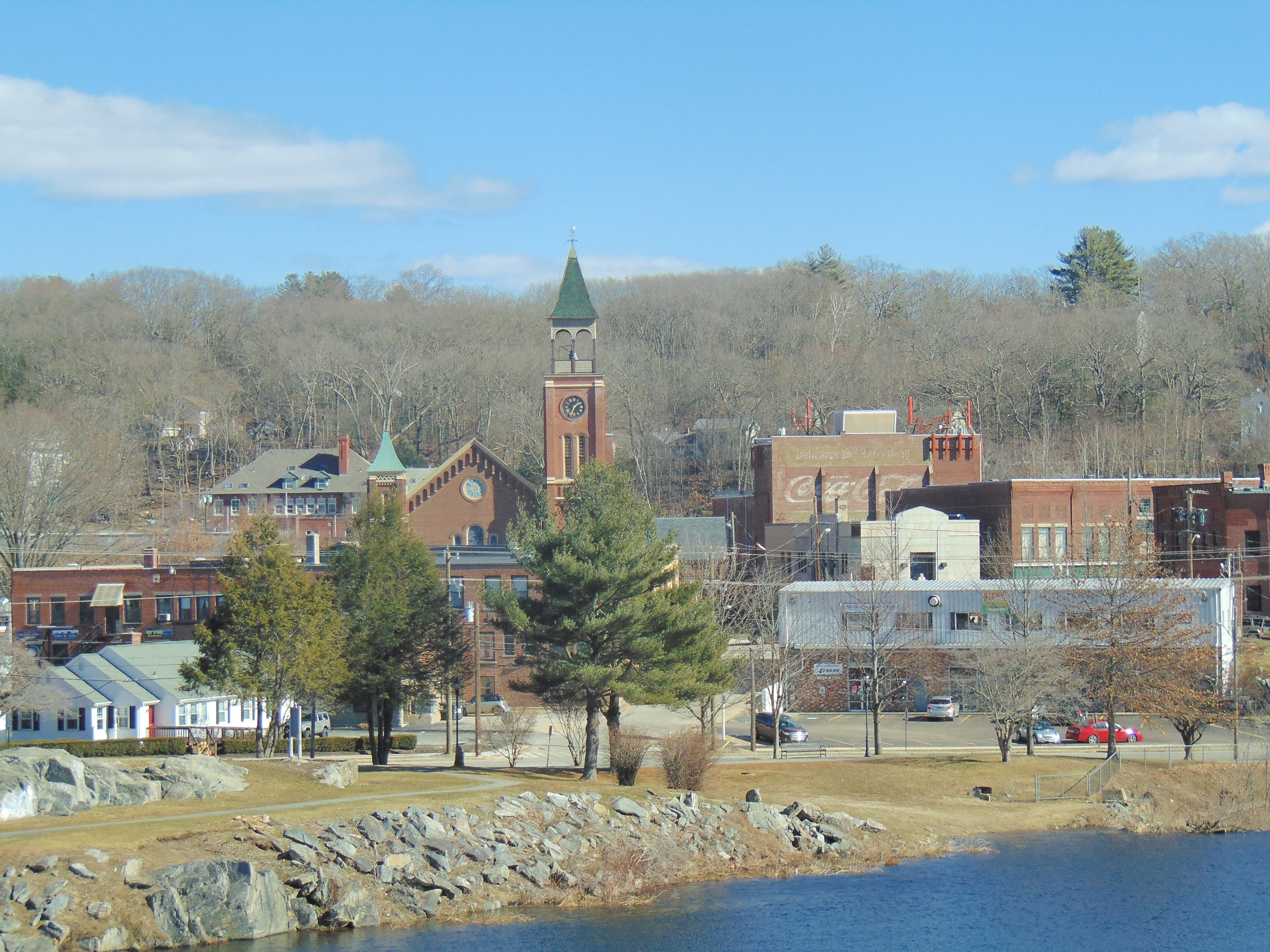
Putnam is an example of a revitalized mill town in Northeastern Connecticut.

== Mill villages ==
Early industry in the area was powered by watermills set on fast rivers and streams such as the Willimantic River and the Quinebaug River. Many were built during the early part of the Industrial Revolution in conjunction with Samuel Slater's famous mills in nearby Massachusetts and Rhode Island. Indeed, many towns of the area once boasted large textile mills and milltowns, such as the Belding Mills in Thompson and Putnam and the Plainfield Woolen Company Mill and for nearly a century (from the early 1800s to roughly the 1930s) were a major source of economic and industrial development in the region. However, by the latter half of the 20th century, many of these mills had fallen into disrepair and by the early 2000s had been dismantled. Of these surviving mill buildings, most have since been renovated into places of local business or stylish condominiums for residents. Several Quiet Corner subcommunities, North Grosvenordale in Thompson, Danielson in Killingly, and Central Village in Plainfield, to this day retain visual echoes of the historic mill-town villages.

== Tourism ==
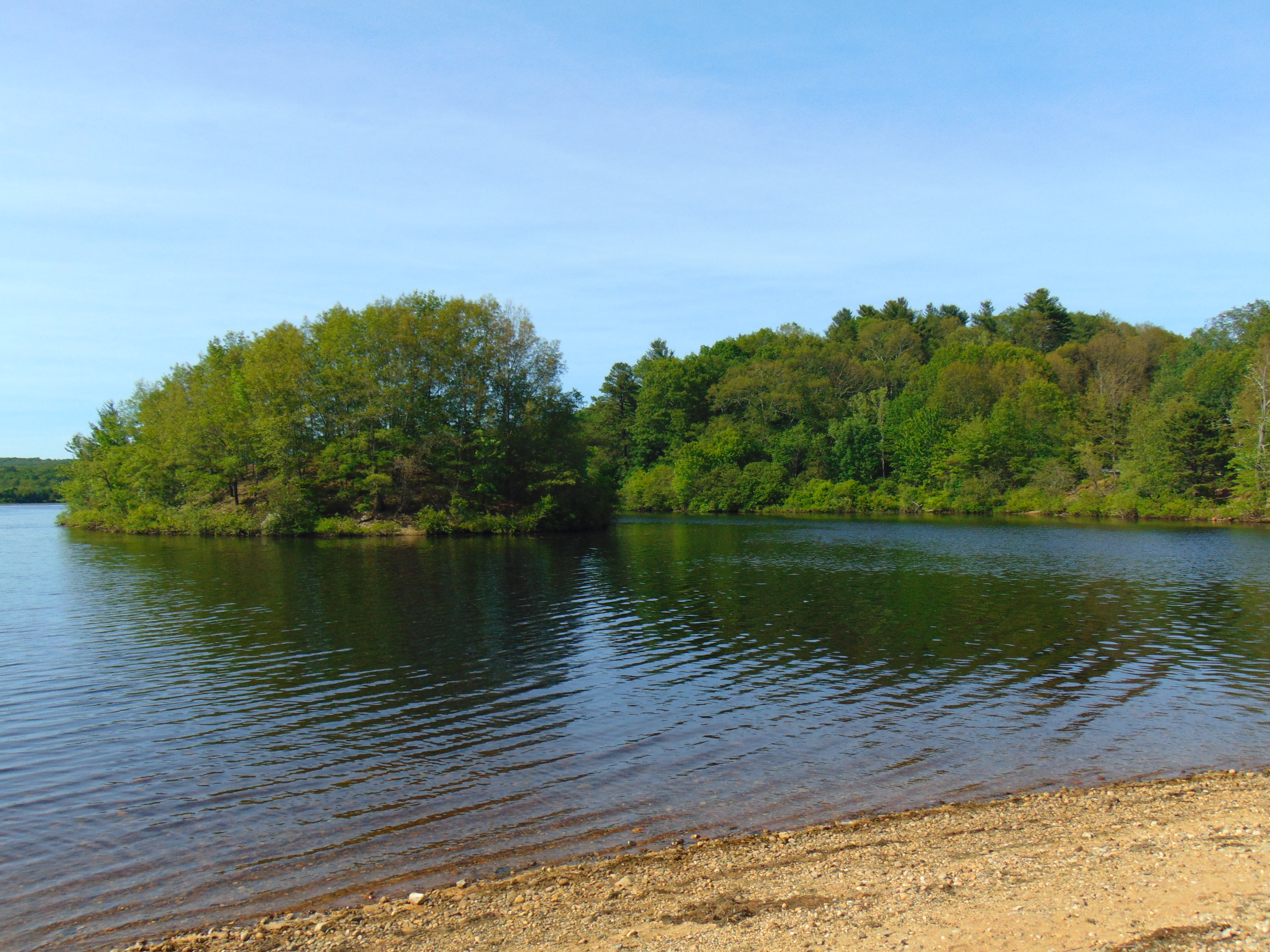
Mansfield Hollow Reservoir, part of the larger state park that encompasses 2,300 acres in Mansfield, Windham, and Chaplin

The Quiet Corner is popular with tourists for its traditional New England scenery and culture, namely: locally produced foods, bed and breakfasts, historic farms, inns, and town centers, stone walls, agricultural fairs, and antique shops. Major attractions in and around the Quiet Corner include:

- Route 169, a National Scenic Byway running north-and-south through the region.
- A scenic segment of Route 44 passing through the rural woodlands of the Quiet Corner.
- The birthplace of Samuel Huntington in Scotland.
- The Northern half of the Airline Trail, which traverses Windham to Thompson.
- Several noted breweries and vineyards, including two Connecticut Wine Trail vineyards, Taylor Brooke and Sharpe Hill.
- The Tourtellotte Memorial Room and Museum, the Thompson Speedway, and the West Thompson Dam in Thompson.
- Historic Roseland Cottage and the Woodstock Fair in Woodstock.
- The Wolf Den in Pomfret.
- The Israel Putnam Monument and Brooklyn Fair in Brooklyn.
- The Lebanon Town Green and its accompanying Revolutionary War historic sites in Lebanon.
- The Prudence Crandall House Museum in Canterbury.
- The Coventry Farmer's Market and Nathan Hale Homestead in Coventry.
- The variety of antique shops of Pomfret, Putnam, and Woodstock.
- The University of Connecticut flagship campus in Storrs.
- The CT-RI-MA Tri-state Marker, denoting the point where the states of Connecticut, Rhode Island, and Massachusetts touch.

The Quiet Corner has seen a resurgence in the past few decades in the production of local foods, producing local wines, cheeses, ice cream, apples, honey, maple syrup, craft beer, and a variety of heirloom crops.

== Towns and cities ==
The following towns are members of the Northeastern Connecticut Council of Governments (NECCOG):

- Ashford
- Brooklyn
- Canterbury
- Chaplin
- Eastford
- Hampton
- Killingly
- Plainfield
- Pomfret
- Putnam
- Scotland
- Sterling
- Thompson
- Union
- Voluntown
- Woodstock
