= Gurley-Mason Mill =

Sawmill built in 1778 in Mansfield, Connecticut

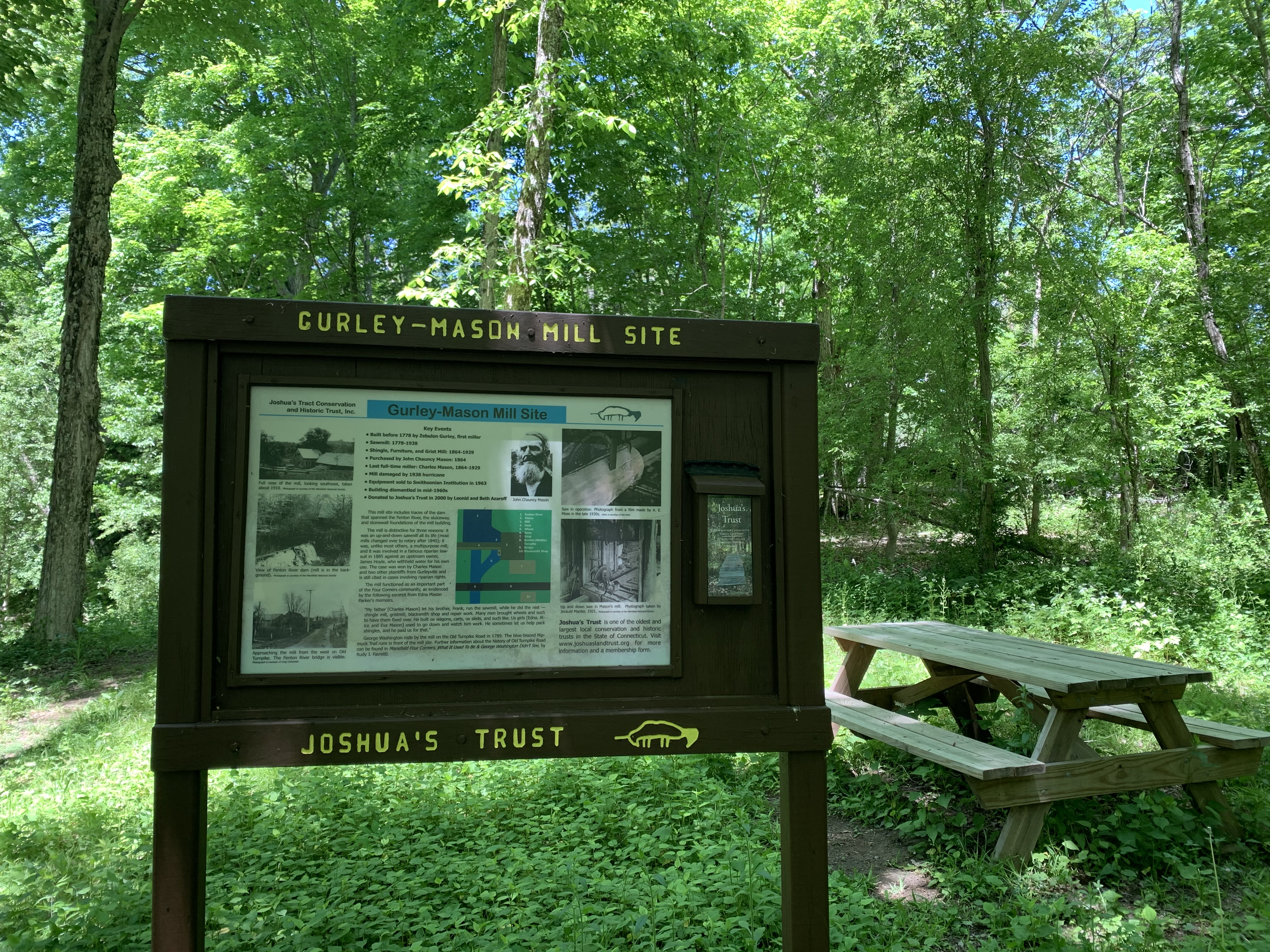

- Location within Connecticut
- Location: Mansfield, Connecticut
- Coordinates: 41.833342°N 72.242907°W
- Area: 2.31 acres (0.93 ha)
- Established: 2000
- Governing body: Joshua's Trust

The Gurley-Mason Mill was a historic sawmill and gristmill located along the Fenton River on the north side of Old Turnpike Road in Mansfield, Connecticut. The mill was built around 1778, shut down around 1935, and demolished in the mid-1960s. The 2.31-acre site and ruins have been conserved by Joshua's Tract Conservation and Historic Trust since 2000. The Gurleyville Historic District lies two miles downriver.

== History ==
The sawmill was built by Zebulon Gurley no later than 1778. It stayed in continuous operation through owners Joseph Tinney, John Grant, John Fitch, and Jillson Darling. In 1864 the Masons purchased the property and added a gristmill. Charles and Frank Mason built a blacksmith shop across the Turnpike from the mill. Frank ran the mill while Charles built chairs, shingles, sleds, and wagons, manufacturing wheel rims and other parts. Frank Mason died in 1928 and Charles in 1929. Charles Mason's sons-in-law, Hibbard Parker and Henry Knowlton, operated the sawmill sporadically thereafter and ceased operations by the mid-1930s. A hurricane washed out the dam in 1938, and attempts by Mason Parker, grandson of Charles Mason, to restore it were unsuccessful. The mill was demolished in the mid-1960s and the smithy around 1975.

The Masons also owned the Mason-Knowlton Place, consisting of a historic farmhouse and two barns, which is listed on the Connecticut State Register of Historic Places. The last Mason to own the mill property was Eva Belle Mason Knowlton, who died in 1983.

The mill property was donated to Joshua's Trust by Leonid and Beth Azaroff in 2000.

== Significance ==
For over 150 years, the mill operated with an up-and-down saw. Although most mills in the United States had switched to rotary saws by 1840, the Mason Mill continued its use until the mill ceased operations around 1935. The Smithsonian Institution purchased the saw and other equipment.

In 1885, Charles Mason, along with Gurleyville millers Emory B. Smith and William Williams, sued James Hoyle, who had dammed the Fenton River in Willington, thereby reducing the water flow for these mills operating downstream. The plaintiffs won the lawsuit, which is still cited as a precedent in cases involving riparian water rights.

== See also ==
- Fenton River
- Joshua's Trust
- Gurleyville Historic District
