= Basset Brook =

- Location of the mouth within Connecticut

Location
- Country: United States
- State: Connecticut
- Counties: Windham

Physical characteristics
- Source: Shallow pond
  - location: 1.4 miles northwest of Warrenville, Windham County, Connecticut, United States
  - coordinates: 41.88086°N 72.17912°W
  - elevation: 590 ft (180 m)approx.
- Mouth: Confluence with Mount Hope River
  - location: 1 mile north of Warrenville, Windham County, Connecticut, United States
  - coordinates: 41.87818°N 72.16092°W
  - elevation: 400 ft (120 m)approx.
- Length: 1.4 mi (2.3 km)approx.

Basset Brook is a stream formed at a shallow pond located approximately 1.4 miles northwest of Warrenville, Connecticut, United States,. The brook flows south and east from this pond and eventually to its mouth at the Mount Hope River, with a length of approximately 1.4 miles.

== Course ==
Basset Brook flows south from its source pond, passing under Perry Hill Road. It then flows southeast, through an area of wetlands. After exiting these wetlands, the brook flows north, back under Perry Hill Road. Basset Brook then turns to the east and flows through a small valley, and under Laurel Lane. The brook flows through a series of rapids, passing under Connecticut Route 89, and then terminates at a farm, where it flows into the Mount Hope River. The majority of Basset Brook runs parallel to Perry Hill Road in Ashford, Connecticut.

== Pollution ==
Basset Brook flows through a farm containing many free cattle. Fecal waste has been known to flow into the brook during rainstorms, causing bacterial contamination in the brook's waters and also in the waters of the Mount Hope River. A fence has been built along the brook in the farm to keep cattle away, and the stream banks have been stabilized with riparian vegetation. Runoff from lawns and roads can also contaminate the brook.

== See also ==
- List of rivers of Connecticut
