= Dorothy Goodwin =

American educator and politician (1914–2007)

Member of the Connecticut House of Representatives
- In office 1975–1984

Personal details
- Born: September 2, 1914 Hartford, Connecticut, US
- Died: June 10, 2007 (aged 92) Bloomfield, Connecticut
- Education: Smith College (BA); University of Connecticut (PhD)
- Occupation: Educator, politician

Dorothy Cheney Goodwin (September 2, 1914 – June 10, 2007) was an American educator and politician. She taught at the University of Connecticut (1957–1974) and served in the Connecticut House of Representatives (1975–1984) as well as on the Connecticut State Board of Education (1984–1990). She was inducted into the Connecticut Women's Hall of Fame in 1994.

== Early life and education ==
Goodwin was born on September 2, 1914, in Hartford, Connecticut, to parents Ruth Cheney and Charles Goodwin. Her father wrote the legislation establishing the Metropolitan District Commission. Goodwin Park was named after her grandfather.

Goodwin attended the Oxford School and Milton Academy, graduated magna cum laude from Smith College with a BA in sociology in 1937, and earned her PhD in agricultural economics from the University of Connecticut in 1957.

== Career ==
Goodwin worked in the Bureau of Indian Affairs from 1937 to 1939 and the Bureau of Agricultural Economics from 1939 to 1942. During World War II Goodwin worked in the Department of Economic Warfare in India. From 1947 to 1951, Goodwin served as a government agricultural economist in Japan. From 1957 to 1969, Goodwin taught economics at the University of Connecticut and served as assistant provost, responsible for institutional research and planning. She retired in 1974.

In 1975, Goodwin was elected to the Connecticut House of Representatives from the 54th District. She served five consecutive terms and chaired the House's education committee. While serving in legislature, she led a compromise reorganization of the state's higher education and, in 1979, shepherded a school equalization plan through the legislature, creating new formulas for state educational aid for cities and towns. From 1984 to 1990, Goodwin served on the Connecticut State Board of Education.

Goodwin served on the board of trustees at the Hartford College for Women and the board of regents at the University of Hartford. She was awarded the Connecticut Humanities Council's Wilbur Cross Award in 1991 for distinguished scholarship and public service teaching.

== Personal life and legacy ==
The Dorothy C. Goodwin Elementary School in Mansfield, Connecticut, was named in her honor in 1992.

In 1993 Goodwin donated almost sixteen acres adjacent to her house in Mansfield, Connecticut, to the Joshua's Trust land conservation organization.

Goodwin died in her home in Bloomfield, Connecticut, in 2007. Her bequest established UConn's Dorothy C. Goodwin Fund for Teacher Preparation.
