= Connecticut Route 89 =

State highway in northeastern Connecticut, US

Route 89
- Map of northeastern Connecticut with Route 89 highlighted in red

Route information
- Maintained by CTDOT
- Length: 16.25 mi (26.15 km)
- Existed: 1932–present

Major junctions
- South end: Route 195 in Mansfield
- I-84 at the Ashford–Union line
- North end: Route 190 in Union

Location
- Country: United States
- State: Connecticut
- Counties: Tolland, Windham

Highway system
- Connecticut State Highway System; Interstate; US; State; SSR; SR; Scenic
← Route 87	→ I-91

Route 89 is a state highway in northeastern Connecticut, United States, running from eastern Mansfield to southern Union. It connects the villages of Mansfield Center, Warrenville, and Westford. It is a two-lane rural collector road throughout its entire length, following the path of the Mount Hope River.

== Route description ==
Route 89 begins at an intersection with Route 195 in the village of Mansfield Center as Warrenville Road and heads north through the northeast portion of the town of Mansfield. Along the way it passes by the north side of Mansfield Hollow Lake then runs parallel to Mount Hope River as it heads into the town of Ashford. Once in Ashford, the road name changes to Mansfield Road until it reaches the village of Warrenville, where it has a junction with U.S. Route 44. Route 89 continues north as Westford Road, still parallel to the Mount Hope River, into the village of Westford. The road turns west on Turnpike Road as it departs the village, then turns north on Ferrence Road towards the town of Union. At the town line, it has an interchange with I-84 (Exit 92). Route 89 ends about 0.6 miles (0.97 km) later at an intersection with Route 190 in the southwest corner of Union.

== History ==
The road connecting Willimantic to Union via Mansfield Center and Westford was designated as State Highway 146 in 1922. In the 1932 state highway renumbering, State Highway 146 was renumbered to Route 89, with a southward extension from Willimantic to Lebanon, ending at modern Route 87. This early Route 89 followed modern Route 289 from Lebanon to Willimantic, then modern Route 195 to Mansfield Center then modern Route 89 to its current end in Union, with the exception of a section north of Westford village that used Waterfall Road instead of Ferrence Road.

In 1942, the Waterfall Road alignment in Ashford was relocated to its current route over Turnpike and Ferrence Roads. In 1964, Route 195 was extended along Route 89 from Mansfield Center to Willimantic. The southern terminus of Route 89 was moved to its current location, with the former section of Route 89 south of the Route 32-Route 66 overlap re-designated as Route 289.

== Junction list ==
County	Location	mi	km	Destinations	Notes
Tolland	Mansfield	0.00	0.00	Route 195 – Willimantic, Storrs	Southern terminus
Windham	Ashford	7.62	12.26	US 44 – Putnam, Mansfield	
Windham–Tolland county line	Ashford–Union line	15.70	25.27	I-84 – Sturbridge, Hartford	Exit 92 on I-84; former I-86
Tolland	Union	16.25	26.15	Route 190 – Union, Stafford Springs	Northern terminus
1.000 mi = 1.609 km; 1.000 km = 0.621 mi
