= Gurleyville Historic District =

Historic district in Connecticut, United States

- U.S. National Register of Historic Places
- U.S. Historic district
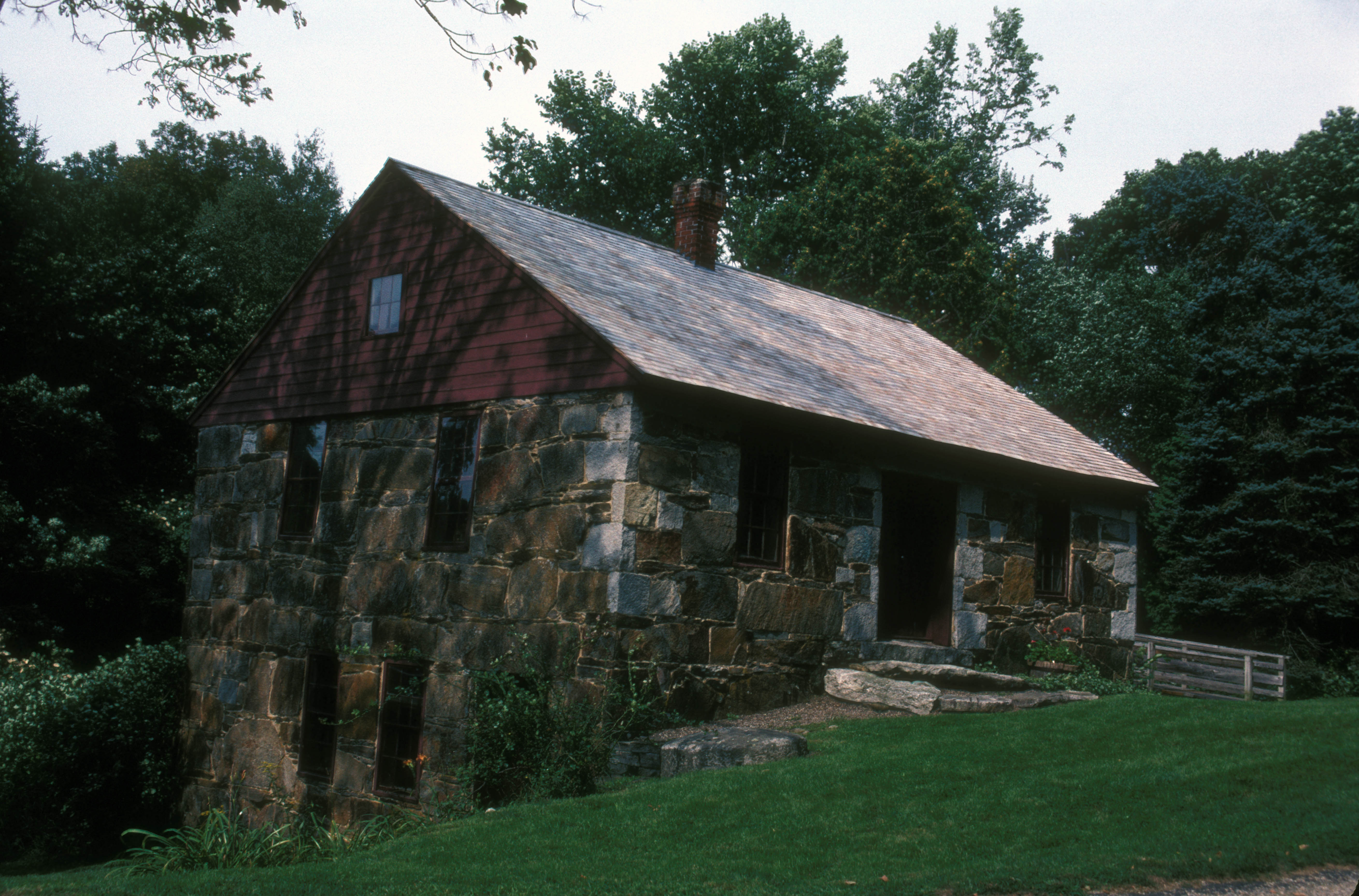

- Location within Connecticut Location within the United States
- Location: Gurleyville and Chaffeeville Roads, Mansfield, Connecticut
- Coordinates: 41°48′47″N 72°13′21″W
- Area: 58 acres (23 ha)
- Architect: Fitch, Edwin
- Architectural style: Italianate
- NRHP reference No.: 75001933
- Added to NRHP: December 30, 1975

The Gurleyville Historic District encompasses a formerly industrial rural crossroads village in Mansfield, Connecticut. Centered on Gurleyville and Chaffeeville Roads, it includes a collection of mainly vernacular 19th-century residences, a stone gristmill dating to about 1749, and the archaeological remains of later industrial endeavours. The district was listed on the National Register of Historic Places in 1975.

== Description and history ==
Gurleyville is located what is now a rural setting of north-central Mansfield, Connecticut. The historic district is bounded on the west mostly by the Fenton River, historically the source of power for the village's mills, and the south by the junction of Stone Mill and Grist Mill Roads. It is basically linear in character, extending northward along Chaffeeville Road to its junction with Gurleyville Road, and then westward along the latter road to the river. Its boundary crosses to the west side of the river north of Gurleyville Road, to include the archaeological remains of a mill site.

Industrial features in the historic district include a stone grist mill and dam on the river that were constructed beginning in 1749 by Benjamin Davis, and include operable 19th-century equipment. Other features include foundations and other ruins of a small 19th-century textile mill known as Royce Silk Mill, and the foundation of a sawmill dating from 1724. There are roughly one dozen historic homes, as well as several buildings originally built for commercial purposes and now used as residences. These houses are typically vernacular in style, with only minimal nods to architectural fashions of the 19th century. Meadowland surrounding the village is included in the district to preserve the village in relation to its historical agricultural setting.

The ruins of the Gurley-Mason Mill, a sawmill built by Zebulon Gurley around 1778, are located two miles to the north along the Fenton River.

Connecticut Governor Wilbur Cross was a native of Gurleyville.

== See also ==
- National Register of Historic Places listings in Tolland County, Connecticut
