= Senator Moulton =

Senator Moulton may refer to:

- George S. Moulton (1829–1882), Connecticut State Senate
- Pat Moulton (1899–1970), Nebraska State Senate
- Sherman R. Moulton (1876–1949), Vermont State Senate
- William C. Moulton (1873–1927), Massachusetts State Senate
