= Mansfield Hollow Historic District =

Historic district in Connecticut, United States

- U.S. National Register of Historic Places
- U.S. Historic district
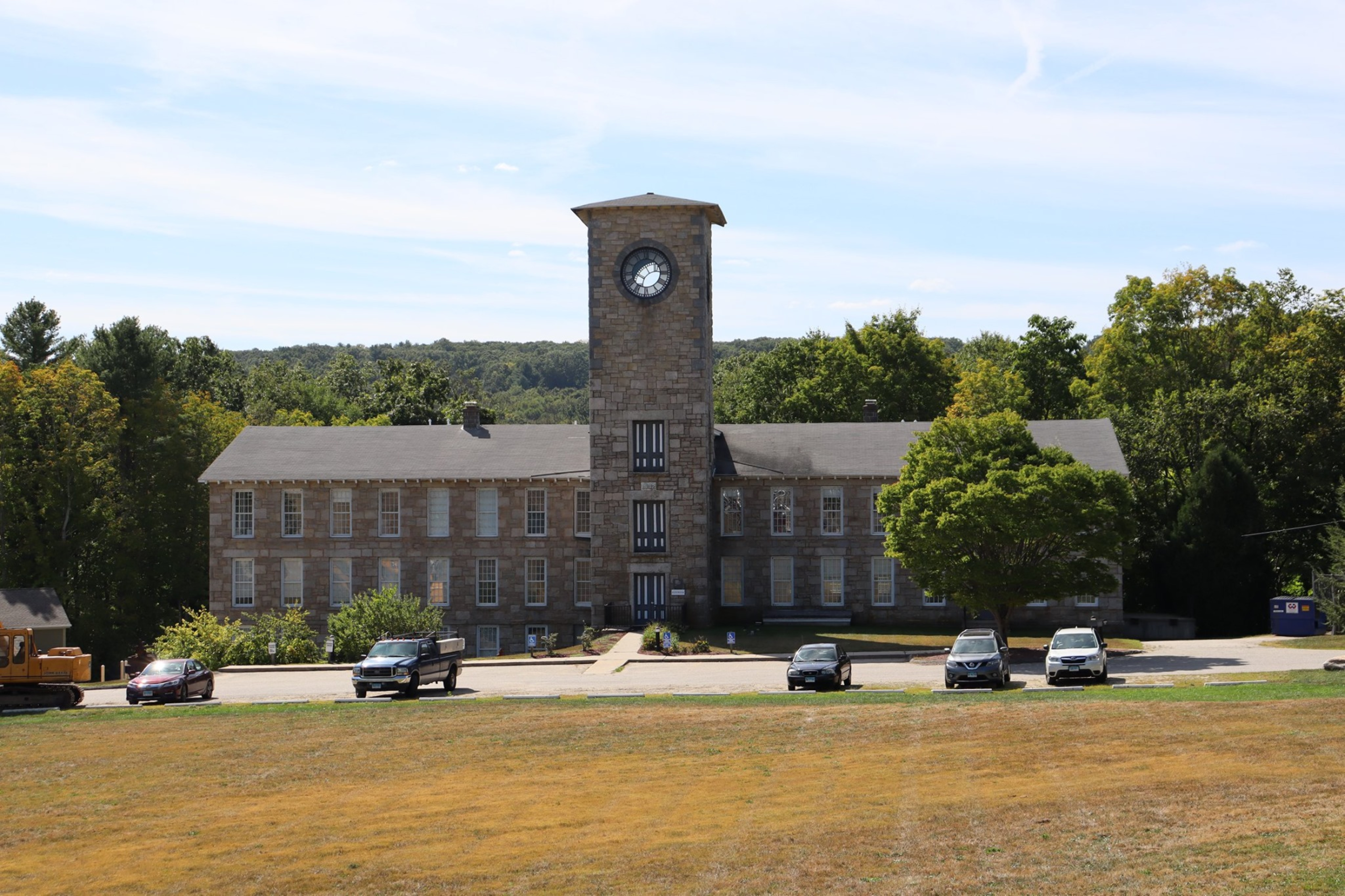
- Kirby's Mill

- Location within Connecticut Location within the United States
- Location: 86-127 Mansfield Hollow Road, Mansfield, Connecticut
- Coordinates: 41°45′25″N 72°11′9″W
- Area: 18 acres (7.3 ha)
- Built: 1800
- Architect: Fitch, Edwin; Multiple
- Architectural style: Greek Revival
- NRHP reference No.: 79002667
- Added to NRHP: May 21, 1979

The Mansfield Hollow Historic District encompasses the remnants of a modest 19th-century industrial village on Mansfield Hollow Road in Mansfield, Connecticut. Originally industrialized with saw and grist mills, a silk mill was added in 1838, when its most significant growth began. The surviving stone mill was built in 1882, and there are a number of nearby houses dating to the industrial period. The district was listed on the National Register of Historic Places in 1979.

== Description and history ==
The central Connecticut town of Mansfield, now best known as the home of the University of Connecticut at Storrs, supported a number of small industrial villages in the 19th century. Mansfield Hollow, located south of Mansfield Center, is one of the places where industry flourished, on the north bank of the Natchaug River, now a short way west of Mansfield Hollow State Park. This area's industrial history began in the 18th century, when Barzillai Swift acquired a water privilege, and established saw and grist mills. His sons George and Fearing continued the business, and also leased part of the privilege to Oliver Bingham. The houses of all three of these men survive in the area today. In 1838 Zalman Storrs established a silk mill, which marked the beginning of textile development and the construction of housing for workers. The silk mill ran for a number of years under several owners, until 1882, when Marcus Johnson built the surviving stone mill for finishing cotton thread. In 1902 it was sold to George Kirby (for whom it is now colloquially known as "Kirby's Mill"), who manufactured brass items until after World War II.

The district extends mainly along Mansfield Hollow Road and Mansfield Hollow Road Extension, and its visual focus is the 1882 stone mill, with its prominent 75-foot (23 m) tower. The district also includes a collection of residential buildings (between 86 and 127 Mansfield Hollow Road), most which are historically significant. Notable among them are the Fearing Swift House, 103 Mansfield Hollow Road, built in 1815, the George Swift House, 100 Mansfield Hollow Road, built in 1804, and the Oliver Bingham House, 88 Mansfield Hollow Road, probably the oldest house in the district (built 1800).

== See also ==
- National Register of Historic Places listings in Tolland County, Connecticut
