= Annie E. Vinton =

American postmistress and politician (1869–1961)

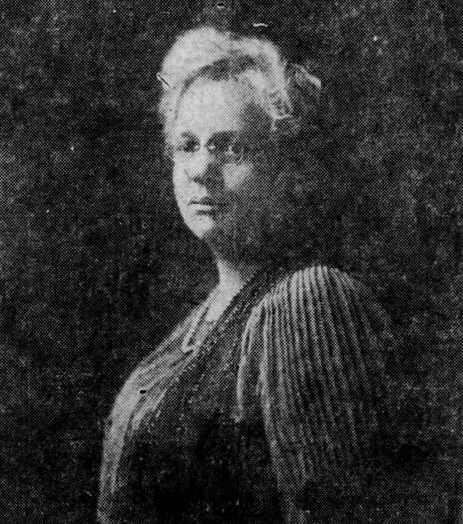

Member of the Connecticut House of Representatives from Mansfield
- In office 1923–1927 Serving with Lewellyn J. Storrs
- Preceded by: Albert E. Anthony; Fred C. Parker
- Succeeded by: Byron D. Houston; Andrew M. Grant
- In office 1931–1933 Serving with Daniel C. Flaherty
- Preceded by: Byron D. Houston; Andrew M. Grant
- Succeeded by: Edwin O. Smith; Andrew M. Grant

Personal details
- Born: Annie E. Rogers; December 22, 1869 Mansfield, Connecticut, U.S.
- Died: December 12, 1961 (aged 91) Plainfield, Connecticut, U.S.
- Party: Republican
- Spouse: Fred Oscar Vinton
- Occupation: Postmistress

Annie E. Vinton (December 22, 1869 – December 12, 1961) was an American postmistress, politician, and dignitary of Mansfield, Connecticut. She served in the Connecticut House of Representatives. A local elementary school and a University of Connecticut dormitory are named in her honor.

== Early life ==
Vinton was born on December 22, 1869, in Somers, Connecticut, to parents Raymond and Sarah (Collins) Rogers. In 1888 she married Fred Oscar Vinton, a storekeeper and sheriff in Eagleville village.

She served as Eagleville postmistress from 1895 to 1917, appointed to the post by President Grover Cleveland after both the Republican and Democratic parties in Mansfield recommended her for the job.

== Public service ==
Vinton represented Mansfield in the Connecticut House of Representatives from 1923 to 1927 and again from 1931 to 1933, serving on the appropriations committee. She was one of only seven women elected to the state legislature in 1922. In addition, she served 19 years on the Mansfield Board of Education. A longstanding member of the Republican Party, Vinton represented Tolland County for 12 years on the Republican State Central Committee.

Vinton was one of the first women to serve on the University of Connecticut's board of trustees, serving from 1922 to 1932. Republican Governor Everett J. Lake appointed Vinton along with Mrs. Otto B. Robinson of Willimantic who served until 1924. Vinton began on Board's home economics committee. In addition, Vinton served on the Board's Storrs Agricultural Experiment Station committee in 1923 and held the office of Board treasurer in 1926. Her father-in-law, Simeon O. Vinton, had been a prosperous local merchant who had served on the college's inaugural board of trustees in 1881–82.

== Death and legacy ==
Vinton died at the age of 91 on December 12, 1961, at a nursing home in Plainfield, Connecticut. Her husband predeceased her, and she had no children. She was interred at the New Storrs Cemetery on a hill overlooking the UConn campus in Storrs.

Opened in 1952, the Annie E. Vinton Elementary School on Route 32 in Mansfield was named in her honor. So was the Vinton House of the Towers Residence Halls located on UConn's Storrs campus.
