= Mansfield Hollow Lake =

- Lake Naubesatuck, Mansfield Lake
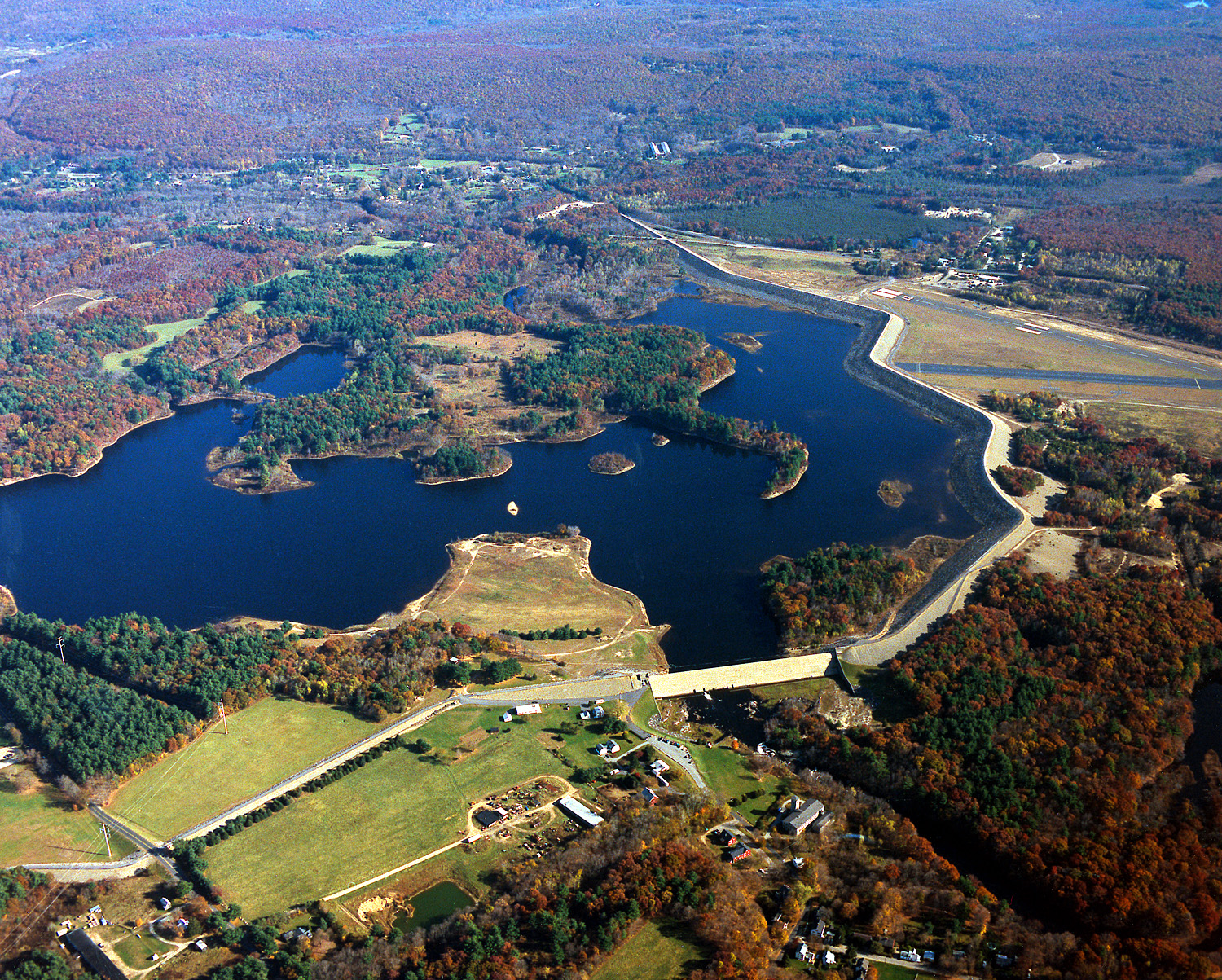
- Aerial view. Windham Airport can be seen at the right.

- Location in Connecticut
- Location: Mansfield & Windham, Connecticut
- Coordinates: 41°46′32″N 72°11′00″W
- Type: Reservoir
- Primary inflows: Natchaug River, Fenton River, Mount Hope River
- Primary outflows: Natchaug River
- Catchment area: 163 sq mi (420 km^{2})
- Basin countries: United States
- Max. length: 2.2 miles (3.5 km)
- Max. width: 2,400 feet (730 m)
- Surface area: 440 acres (180 ha): Normal pool
- Max. depth: 23 ft (7.0 m)
- Water volume: 90,000,000 cubic feet (2,500,000 m^{3}): Normal pool
- Surface elevation: 210 feet (64 m)
- Settlements: Mansfield Center

Mansfield Hollow Dam
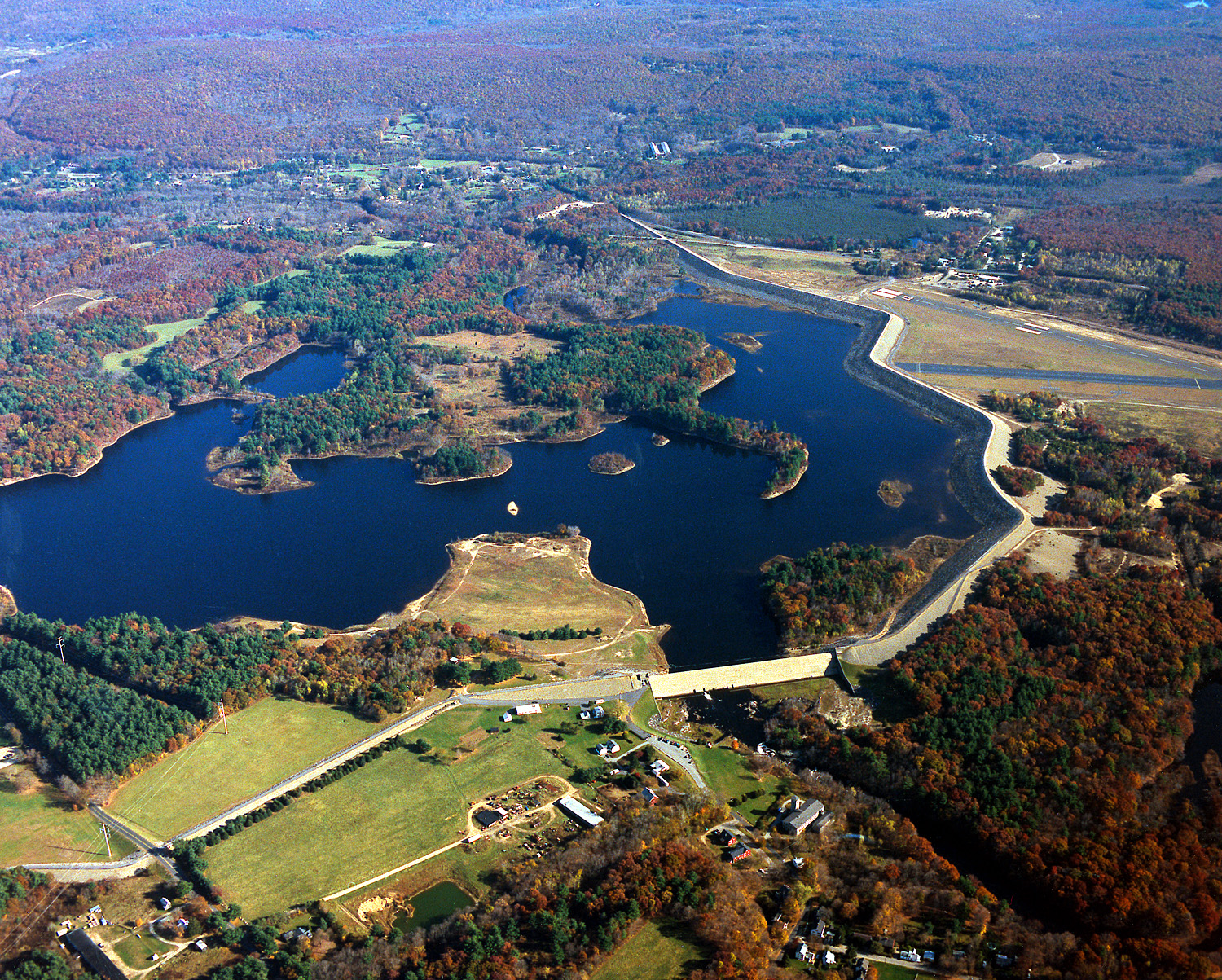
- Interactive map of Mansfield Hollow Dam
- Official name: Mansfield Hollow Dam
- Location: Mansfield & Windham
- Construction began: 1949
- Opening date: 1952
- Mansfield Hollow Dam
- U.S. National Register of Historic Places
- NRHP reference No.: 03000194
- Added to NRHP: April 12, 2003
- Operator: Army Corps of Engineers

Dam and spillways
- Impounds: Natchaug River
- Height: 68 ft (21 m)
- Length: 12,420 ft (3,790 m)
- Width (crest): 15 ft (4.6 m)
- Width (base): 265 ft (81 m)

Reservoir
- Creates: Mansfield Hollow Lake (Lake Naubesatuck)

Mansfield Hollow Lake is a reservoir resting on the border of Windham County and Tolland County, Connecticut. The reservoir provides drinking water for Willimantic and helps control flooding in the 159-square-mile Thames River watershed. It was created by the Mansfield Hollow Dam and is entirely contained within Mansfield Hollow State Park and the Mansfield Hollow Wildlife Area. Designed and constructed by the United States Army Corps of Engineers, the dam substantially reduces flooding along the Natchaug, Shetucket, and Thames rivers. Construction of the project began in 1949 with completion in 1952 at a cost of US$6.5 million. The Mansfield Hollow reservoir is located within the Shetucket River Watershed and is part of the Thames River Basin. Access to the site is available from US Route 6 and State Route 195. The damsite, covering an area of 25 acres (10 ha), was listed on the National Register of Historic Places in 2003.

== Description ==
The project consists of a rolled earth fill dam with stone slope protection 12,420 feet (3,790 m) long and 68 feet (21 m) high. The spillway comprises a concrete weir 690 ft (210 m) in length. The weir's crest elevation is 16 feet (4.9 m) lower than the top of the dam. The permanent lake at Mansfield Hollow Dam, Naubesatuck Lake is 450 acres (1.8 km^{2}) in size. The flood storage area for the entire project covers about 1,880 acres (7.6 km^{2}) in the towns of Mansfield, Windham, and Chaplin, Connecticut. The entire project, including all associated lands, covers 2,472 acres (10.00 km^{2}). The Mansfield Hollow Dam can store up to 8.3 billion US gallons (31,000,000 m^{3}) of water for flood control purposes. This is equivalent to 6.1 inches (150 mm) of water runoff from its drainage area of 159 square miles (410 km^{2}).

== Recreation ==
Mansfield Hollow State Park is located on Bassetts Bridge Road in the town of Mansfield. The park offers boating (8 mph limit), fishing, a shaded picnic area and many miles of hiking, mountain biking and cross-country ski trails. A boat launch is located on Bassetts Bridge Road in the town of Mansfield, 1/2 mile east of the state park entrance. It is open daily from 8 a.m. to sunset. There is no entrance fee. This area is managed by the Connecticut Department of Energy and Environmental Protection.

Mansfield Hollow Dam is located on Mansfield Hollow Road in the town of Mansfield. Visitors can picnic on the lawn both downstream of the dam and on the lake side of the dam. The top of the dam is popular for walking, jogging, and biking. The west half of the dam is approx. 1-mile (1.6 km) long, the east half is almost 2 miles (3.2 km) long. Parking is available at the State Park, Damsite, Commuter Parking Lot on US Route 6, and athletic field parking lot on State Route 89. The dam runs alongside Windham Airport.

== See also ==
- Last Green Valley National Heritage Corridor
- National Register of Historic Places listings in Tolland County, Connecticut
- National Register of Historic Places listings in Windham County, Connecticut
