= Elijah Porter Barrows =

American minister

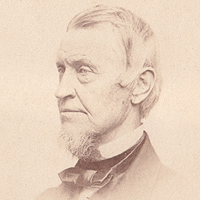
Elijah Porter Barrows from a c. 1865 carte de visite photograph by George Kendall Warren

Elijah Porter Barrows (5 January 1807 – 14 September 1888) was an American clergyman and writer. He was born in Mansfield, Connecticut.

== Background ==
Barrows graduated from Yale in 1826, and, after teaching school for five years at Hartford, was ordained in 1832. In 1835, he declined a position at Oberlin College, choosing instead to become pastor of the first free Presbyterian Church in New York City. Here Barrows remained until 1837, when he accepted the professorship of sacred literature in Western Reserve College (1837–52). In 1853, he was appointed professor of Hebrew language and literature in Andover Theological Seminary, retaining the office until 1866. In 1858, Barrows' D.D. was awarded by Dartmouth College. In 1872, he accepted a like appointment at the Oberlin Theological Seminary.

Besides twenty-five articles in the Bibliotheca Sacra, Barrows has published A Memoir of Evertin Judson (1852); Companion to the Bible (1869); and Sacred Geography and Antiquities (1872). He has also been one of the editors of the American Tract Society's Bible with Notes. Barrows wrote the hymn "Hallelujah, Christ is mine", which has been translated into several languages. Barrows' will left some 70 volumes of his private library to Oberlin College.
