= Natchaug River =

American river

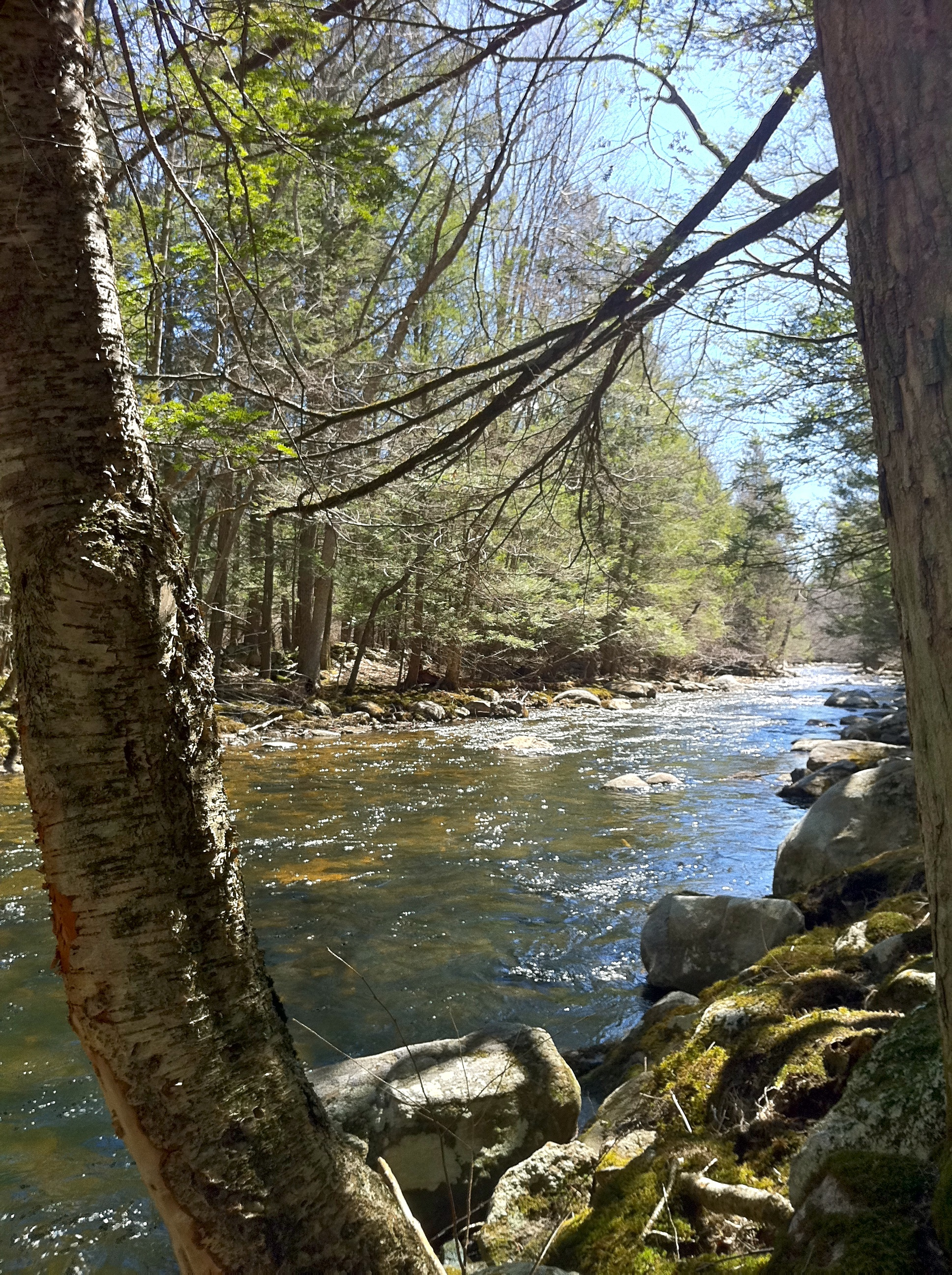
- Bigelow Brook from the Natchaug Trail in Eastford Connecticut, the head waters of the Natchaug River.

- Location of the mouth within Connecticut

Location
- Country: United States
- State: Connecticut
- Counties: Tolland, Windham

Physical characteristics
- Source: Confluence of Still River and Bigelow Brook. Nearby Charlie Brown Campground
  - location: Eastford, Windham County, Connecticut, United States
  - coordinates: 41.86406°N 72.09005°W
- Mouth: Confluence with Willimantic River to form Shetucket River
  - location: Willimantic, Windham County, Connecticut, United States
  - coordinates: 41°42′46″N 72°11′30″W

The Natchaug River is a 17.9-mile-long (28.8 km) river in Windham and Tolland Counties in northeastern Connecticut. The name Natchaug comes from the Nipmuc language and is believed to mean land between rivers.

== Course ==
The Natchaug River is formed in Eastford, Connecticut at the confluence of Bigelow Brook and the Still River. It then flows to the south, paralleling Connecticut Route 198. The river also runs along (and in a few cases through) the western border of the main Natchaug State Forest parcel. Where the river briefly passes through Natchaug State Forest, locals can have picnics along the river, go fishing, and enjoy white-water rafting through the abundant rapids and swimming in the river's clean water. This spot becomes very crowded during the summer. After passing through this area, the Natchaug River begins flowing in a more southwesterly direction, still paralleling Connecticut Route 198. The river now enters the town of Chaplin. Diana's Pool, another popular swimming hole for locals, lies on the Natchaug River just before this point. The river then continues to flow to the southwest, entering Windham, and paralleling U.S. Route 6. It finally flows into the Mansfield Hollow Lake near the Windham Airport. The Natchaug River then flows out of the Mansfield Hollow Reservoir through the Mansfield Hollow Dam, now carrying the waters of the Mount Hope River and the Fenton River, which also flow into the Mansfield Hollow Reservoir. After leaving the reservoir, the Natchaug River forms the border between the towns of Mansfield and Windham, and also the border between Windham County and Tolland County. It then flows in and out of the Willimantic Reservoir, which is used for drinking water purposes and not for recreational use, then enters Willimantic. it joins the Willimantic River, forming the Shetucket River.

Large boulders and rapids can be found along much of the river. A small oxbow forms just south of the Reservoir, nearby US 6, causing the boundary of Windham and Mansfield to depart from the river briefly.

== Crossings ==
County	Town	Carriers
Windham	Chaplin	Morey Road
Windham	Chaplin	Marcy Road
Windham	Chaplin	North Bear Hill Road
Windham	Chaplin	England Road
Windham	Chaplin	Route 198
Windham	Windham	Mansfield Road
Tolland	Mansfield	None
Windham	Windham	US 6
Windham	Windham	Airline State Park Trail
Windham	Windham	Route 66
Windham	Windham	Route 14

== Environmental issues ==
The Natchaug River has been tested for the presence of PFAS following the June 8, 2019 incident that spilled thousands of gallons of firefighting foam in the Farmington River. Elevated levels of PFAS were found in bass collected in the Natchaug River, the Shetucket River and the Willimantic River. As of 2023, the Connecticut Department of Energy & Environmental Protection still mentions a fish consumption advisory in effect for those three rivers.

== Whitewater rafting ==
The Natchaug River is popular with rafters for its swift waters and challenging rapids. The river has a particularly challenging stretch in Chaplin. This stretch is less than a mile but is quite intense, ranking at Class IV on the International Scale of River Difficulty, and with a number of waterfall-like drops.

== Fishing ==
The Natchaug River is popular with fishermen from the area. The river is stocked with trout by the Connecticut Department of Environmental Protection, but several other types of fish also swim in its waters.

== See also ==
- List of rivers of Connecticut
- Natchaug School
- Natchaug Trail
