= Mansfield Center, Connecticut =

Census-designated place in Connecticut, United States

- CDP
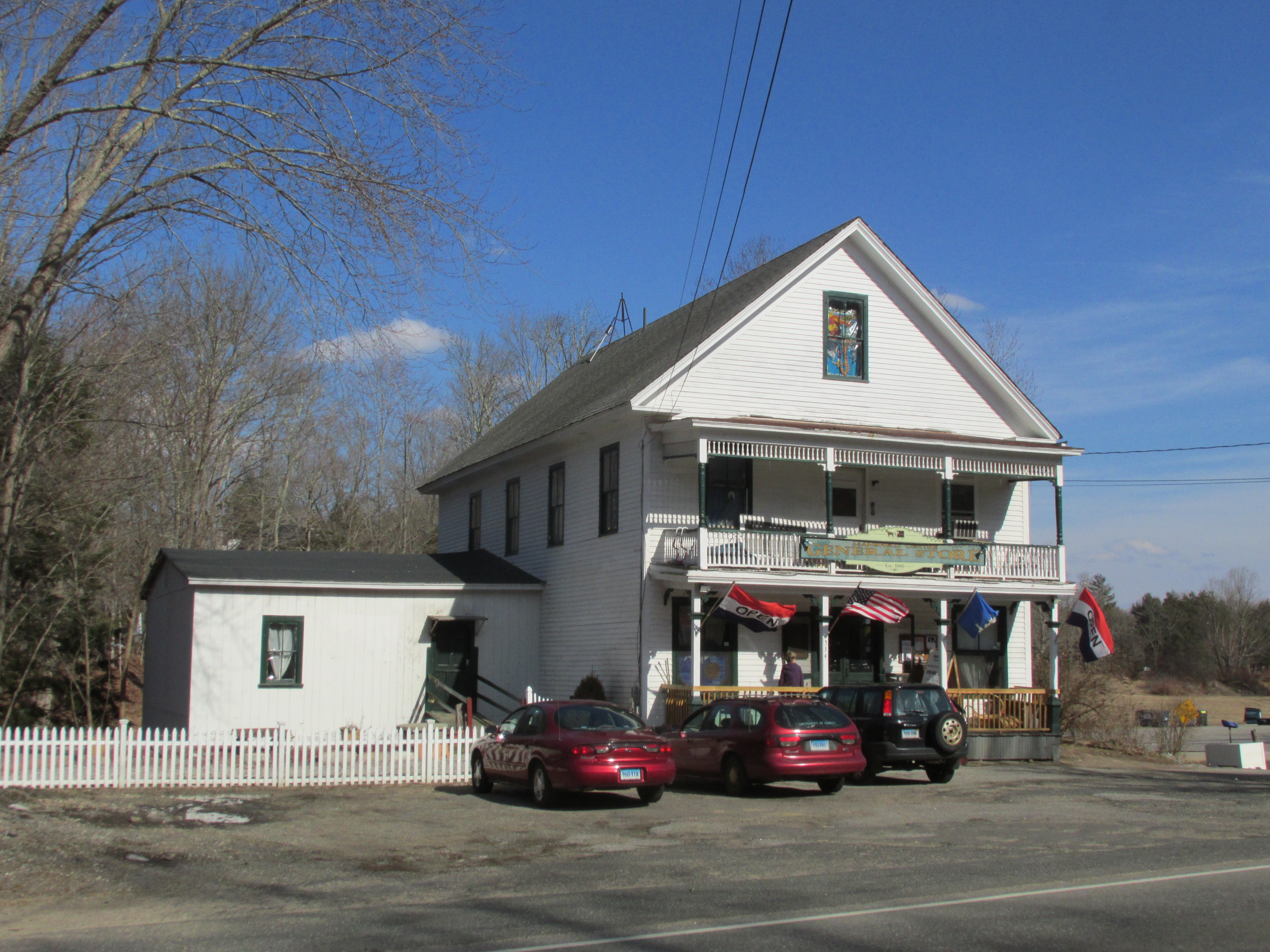
- Mansfield Center General Store

- Location in Tolland County and the state of Connecticut
- Coordinates: 41°45′59″N 72°11′41″W
- Country: United States
- State: Connecticut
- County: Tolland

Area
  - Total: 3.4 sq mi (8.8 km^{2})
  - Land: 3.1 sq mi (7.9 km^{2})
  - Water: 0.35 sq mi (0.9 km^{2})
- Elevation: 256 ft (78 m)

Population (2010)
  - Total: 947
  - Density: 319/sq mi (123.1/km^{2})
- Time zone: UTC-5 (Eastern (EST))
  - Summer (DST): UTC-4 (EDT)
- ZIP code: 06250
- Area code: 860
- FIPS code: 09-45120
- GNIS feature ID: 0208699

Mansfield Center is a village within the town of Mansfield in Tolland County, Connecticut, United States. The village is the basis of a census-designated place (CDP) of the same name; as of the 2020 census, the CDP had a population of 1,021. The CDP includes the original settlement of Mansfield, Mansfield Center or Mansfield Village, as well as the village of Mansfield Hollow. Mansfield Hollow State Park is also located within the boundaries of the CDP.

== Demographics ==
=== 2020 census ===
As of the 2020 census, Mansfield Center had a population of 1,021. The median age was 43.1 years. 19.0% of residents were under the age of 18 and 20.1% of residents were 65 years of age or older. For every 100 females there were 97.5 males, and for every 100 females age 18 and over there were 97.4 males age 18 and over.

51.6% of residents lived in urban areas, while 48.4% lived in rural areas.

There were 433 households in Mansfield Center, of which 27.7% had children under the age of 18 living in them. Of all households, 53.8% were married-couple households, 15.9% were households with a male householder and no spouse or partner present, and 23.3% were households with a female householder and no spouse or partner present. About 28.8% of all households were made up of individuals and 13.9% had someone living alone who was 65 years of age or older.

There were 461 housing units, of which 6.1% were vacant. The homeowner vacancy rate was 0.6% and the rental vacancy rate was 4.6%.

Racial composition as of the 2020 census
Race	Number	Percent
White	858	84.0%
Black or African American	12	1.2%
American Indian and Alaska Native	2	0.2%
Asian	73	7.1%
Native Hawaiian and Other Pacific Islander	0	0.0%
Some other race	14	1.4%
Two or more races	62	6.1%
Hispanic or Latino (of any race)	66	6.5%

=== 2000 census ===
As of the 2000 census, there were 973 people, 373 households, and 239 families residing in the CDP. The population density was 123.2 people/km^{2} (319 people/mi^{2}). There were 382 housing units at an average density of 48.4 units/km^{2} (125 units/mi^{2}). The racial makeup of the CDP was 92.19% White, 1.23% African American, 0.21% Native American, 4.01% Asian, 0.10% Pacific Islander, 0.41% from other races, and 1.85% from two or more races. Hispanic or Latino of any race were 1.44% of the population.

There were 373 households, out of which 25.7% had children under the age of 18 living with them, 55.2% were married couples living together, 6.2% had a female householder with no husband present, and 35.9% were non-families. 26.3% of all households were made up of individuals, and 9.7% had someone living alone who was 65 years of age or older. The average household size was 2.38 and the average family size was 2.85.

In the CDP, the population was spread out, with 18.8% under the age of 18, 8.1% from 18 to 24, 23.8% from 25 to 44, 25.9% from 45 to 64, and 23.3% who were 65 years of age or older. The median age was 44 years. For every 100 females, there were 87.5 males. For every 100 females age 18 and over, there were 85.4 males.

The median income for a household in the CDP was $53,125, and the median income for a family was $76,194. Males had a median income of $40,625 versus $29,886 for females. The per capita income for the CDP was $24,401. About 2.9% of families and 7.2% of the population were below the poverty line, including 12.7% of those under age 18 and none of those age 65 or over.

== Historic features ==
Mansfield Center Cemetery, which contains many 18th-century gravestones, is listed on the National Register of Historic Places as a fine example of the rich artistic tradition of funerary stone carving in colonial New England.

Historic buildings in Mansfield Center include the Barrows and Burnham Store, a general store built in 1886.

== Geography ==
According to the United States Census Bureau, the CDP has a total area of 8.8 km^{2} (3.4 sq mi), of which 7.9 km^{2} (3.1 sq mi) is land and 0.9 km^{2} (0.35 sq mi) (10.56%) is water.

=== Climate ===
Climate data for Windham County, Connecticut (including University of Connecticut and Storrs, Connecticut), 1991–2020 normals, extremes 1888–present
Month	Jan	Feb	Mar	Apr	May	Jun	Jul	Aug	Sep	Oct	Nov	Dec	Year
Record high °F (°C)	68 (20)	69 (21)	83 (28)	95 (35)	93 (34)	96 (36)	101 (38)	97 (36)	97 (36)	89 (32)	82 (28)	73 (23)	101 (38)
Mean maximum °F (°C)	56.4 (13.6)	55.2 (12.9)	64.1 (17.8)	77.7 (25.4)	84.1 (28.9)	87.3 (30.7)	89.8 (32.1)	87.8 (31.0)	84.0 (28.9)	76.1 (24.5)	68.2 (20.1)	59.8 (15.4)	91.6 (33.1)
Mean daily maximum °F (°C)	35.0 (1.7)	37.2 (2.9)	44.8 (7.1)	57.0 (13.9)	67.6 (19.8)	75.6 (24.2)	80.5 (26.9)	79.1 (26.2)	72.7 (22.6)	61.3 (16.3)	50.3 (10.2)	40.1 (4.5)	58.4 (14.7)
Daily mean °F (°C)	26.9 (−2.8)	28.8 (−1.8)	36.3 (2.4)	47.5 (8.6)	57.7 (14.3)	66.3 (19.1)	71.7 (22.1)	70.0 (21.1)	63.4 (17.4)	52.1 (11.2)	42.1 (5.6)	32.7 (0.4)	49.6 (9.8)
Mean daily minimum °F (°C)	18.8 (−7.3)	20.4 (−6.4)	27.8 (−2.3)	38.0 (3.3)	47.7 (8.7)	57.0 (13.9)	62.8 (17.1)	60.9 (16.1)	54.1 (12.3)	42.9 (6.1)	34.0 (1.1)	25.3 (−3.7)	40.8 (4.9)
Mean minimum °F (°C)	−0.2 (−17.9)	3.2 (−16.0)	11.1 (−11.6)	26.6 (−3.0)	36.4 (2.4)	44.9 (7.2)	53.3 (11.8)	51.2 (10.7)	40.3 (4.6)	29.7 (−1.3)	20.0 (−6.7)	9.9 (−12.3)	−2.1 (−18.9)
Record low °F (°C)	−19 (−28)	−20 (−29)	−6 (−21)	10 (−12)	25 (−4)	35 (2)	42 (6)	37 (3)	26 (−3)	16 (−9)	1 (−17)	−17 (−27)	−20 (−29)
Average precipitation inches (mm)	3.65 (93)	2.99 (76)	4.38 (111)	4.23 (107)	3.73 (95)	4.52 (115)	4.01 (102)	4.30 (109)	4.48 (114)	4.58 (116)	3.90 (99)	4.50 (114)	49.27 (1,251)
Average snowfall inches (cm)	8.3 (21)	14.1 (36)	6.3 (16)	1.7 (4.3)	0.0 (0.0)	0.0 (0.0)	0.0 (0.0)	0.0 (0.0)	0.0 (0.0)	0.3 (0.76)	1.1 (2.8)	7.2 (18)	39.0 (99)
Average precipitation days (≥ 0.01 in)	10.2	9.0	10.2	11.3	12.7	10.9	10.5	9.5	9.0	10.6	9.1	10.4	123.4
Average snowy days (≥ 0.1 in)	3.8	4.0	2.5	0.6	0.0	0.0	0.0	0.0	0.0	0.1	0.4	2.1	13.5
Source 1: NOAA
Source 2: National Weather Service

== Notable people ==
- Peter Tork, musician and actor with The Monkees
- Theodore Stowell, early president of Bryant University
