= Theodore Stowell =

American academic (1847–1916)

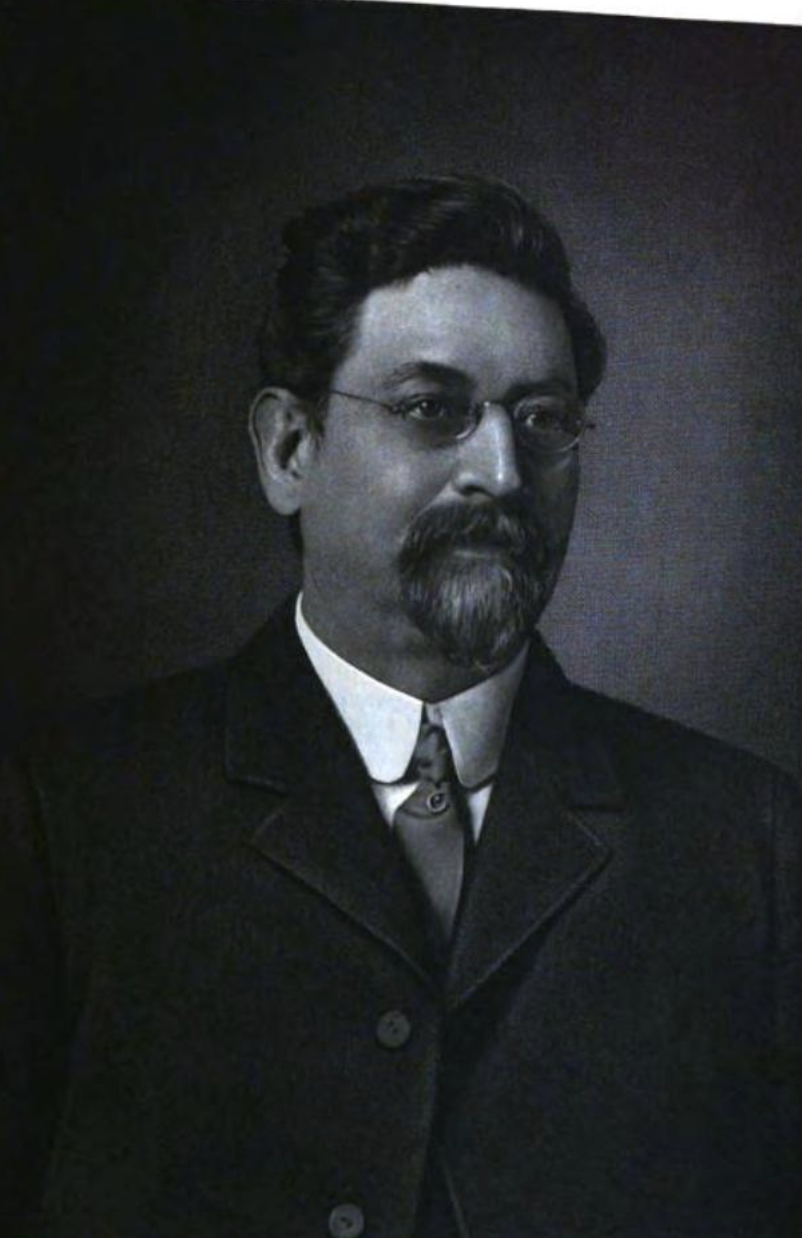
Theodore Barrows Stowell, president of Bryant University

Theodore Stowell (1847 – 1916) was an early president of Bryant College (now Bryant University).

== Biography ==
Theodore Barrows Stowell was born in Mansfield Center, Connecticut in 1847 to an old New England family of farmers and land owners, and he attended Woodstock Academy and the Connecticut State Normal School (now the Central Connecticut State University). He then worked as a teacher in Bridgeport, Connecticut and then by 1870 at Portsmouth, Rhode Island at the Bristol Ferry School. In 1872 Stowell became a faculty member at Bryant, which was then located in Providence, and in 1878 he became principal and purchased the school from the Bryant and Stratton families. Stowell served as president until his death 1916 at which point Bryant College completed its merger with Henry Jacobs' Rhode Island Commercial School.

Stowell was active in various organizations, including the Providence Chamber of Commerce, Rotary Club, and the Beneficent Congregational Church in Providence. He married Florence Taylor of Connecticut in 1871, and they remained married until his death.

== Honors ==
In 1915 Stowell received an honorary degree from Brown University, and Stowell Hall on Bryant's Providence campus was named in his honor, but was sold to Brown University in 1969. In 2005 Stowell was inducted posthumously into the Rhode Island Heritage Hall of Fame .
