= Goodwin Park (Hartford, Connecticut) =

Park in Connecticut, United States

- Interactive map of Goodwin Park
- Type: Urban park
- Location: Hartford, Connecticut and Wethersfield, Connecticut
- Coordinates: 41.7262771°N 72.6926532°W
- Area: 237 acres (96 ha)
- Created: 1901

Goodwin Park is a city park and golf course located in Hartford and Wethersfield, Connecticut. Opened to the public in 1901, it covers 227 acres (92 ha) and offers a playground, community pool and a 27-hole golf course.

In December each year, the park hosts Holiday Lights Fantasia, a Greater Hartford tradition since 1999 where illuminated structures festoon the interior road and thousands of cars stream through the park to enjoy 1 million lights.

== History ==
In the late-1800s, Hartford was seeing a boom in the development of parks. Reverend Francis Goodwin, who was chairman of the Hartford Parks Commission, championed the cause of green spaces with his slogan, "More Parks for Hartford." His plan was have the city circled by parks, much like the Emerald Necklace system that had been laid out in Boston. Rev. Goodwin persuaded Charles Pond to donate his large estate to the cause, as well as Henry Keney to donate his land. These properties later became Elizabeth Park and Keney Park. South Park was developed in the southern end of the city, and formally established as a park November 4, 1895. It opened to the public in 1901 with the remaining 37 acres (15 ha) acquired in 1927. The following year, the parks commission renamed it Goodwin Park in recognition of Rev. Goodwin's service to the city.

The design of the park was developed by Frederick Law Olmsted of Brookline, Massachusetts in 1900. This plan shows a grand meadow framed by tree plantations with individual trees and small clusters within the meadow space, and a small water feature. The park was constructed essentially as designed. The park was named in 1900 in recognition of the valuable services of Francis Goodwin, first president of the Hartford Park Board under the new city charter. The design plan was expanded to include the southeast corner of the current park land, which includes part of the golf course, the second pond and surrounding area.

The large 90 acres (36 ha) central area in the park was originally left open and unmowed and was known as the Great Meadow. The meadow was first disturbed in the 1920s when the central part was leveled off and used as an airstrip for early air mail planes. Later on the Great Meadow was replaced with the Goodwin Park Public Golf Course. The golf course area was used as an emergency landing field for airplanes during World War II.

== Goodwin Park Golf Course ==
The Goodwin Park Golf Course is a 27-hole facility, which dates back to 1927, has recently reopened after $1 million in improvements made by the city of Hartford since 2013. There is an 18 hole, 6015 yard South Course, and the North Course, also known as the "flat nine," is a nine hole course for beginning golfers that is "the oldest municipal nine [hole course] in the country dating back to the late 1800s."
