= George S. Moulton =

American politician

George S. Moulton (1829-1882) was a member of the Connecticut House of Representatives in 1871 and 1877. In 1878 he was elected to the Connecticut Senate from the Thirteenth Senatorial District.

He was born on September 13, 1829, in Mansfield, Connecticut. His parents were Harvey Moulton and Anna M. Turner. He married Caroline F. Hazen and had three children. He died June 8, 1882. Over the course of his career he had been a director of textile companies, banks and railroads.
