= Mansfield, Connecticut =

Mansfield
- Town
- Town of Mansfield
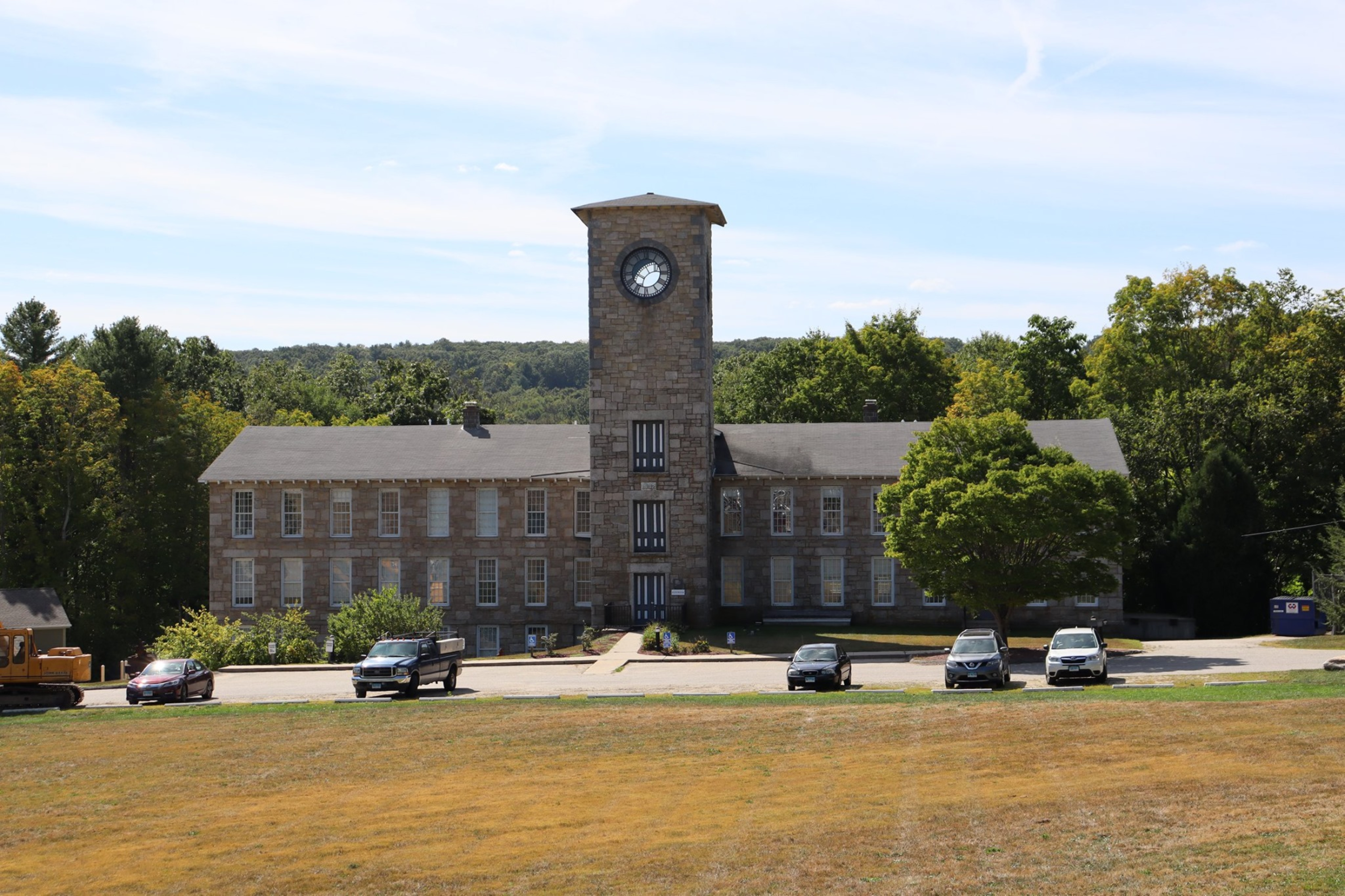
- Kirby's Mill, in the Mansfield Hollow part of town

- Seal
- Interactive map of Mansfield
- Coordinates: 41°47′18″N 72°13′44″W
- Country: United States
- U.S. state: Connecticut
- County: Tolland
- Region: Capitol Region
- Incorporated: 1702

Government
  - Type: Council-Manager
  - Town Manager: Ryan Aylesworth
  - Mayor: Toni Moran (D)
  - Town council: Ben Shaiken (D), Deputy Mayor; Sarah Dufresne (D); Carlita Cotton (D); Lizzie Mullen (D); Samuel Bruder (D); Gail Zaicek (R); Chris Kueffner (R); Bill Tomecko (R)

Area
  - Total: 45.5 sq mi (117.8 km^{2})
  - Land: 44.5 sq mi (115.2 km^{2})
  - Water: 1.0 sq mi (2.7 km^{2})
- Elevation: 640 ft (195 m)

Population (2020)
  - Total: 25,892
  - Density: 582/sq mi (224.8/km^{2})
- Time zone: UTC-5 (Eastern)
  - Summer (DST): UTC-4 (Eastern)
- ZIP Codes: 06235, 06250, 06268, 06269
- Area codes: 860/959
- FIPS code: 09-44910
- GNIS feature ID: 0213456
- Website: www.mansfieldct.gov

Mansfield (/ˈmænsfild/ MANS-feeld) is a town in Tolland County, Connecticut, United States. The town is part of the Capitol Planning Region. The population was 25,892 at the 2020 census.

Pequot and Mohegan people lived in this region for centuries before the arrival of English settler-immigrants in the late 17th century. By 1692, English settlers put down roots in the area that is now Mansfield Center.

Mansfield was incorporated in October 1702, separating from the Town of Windham, in Hartford County. The community was named after Major Moses Mansfield, a part-owner of the town site. When Windham County was formed on May 12, 1726, Mansfield then became part of that county. A century later, at a town meeting on April 3, 1826, selectmen voted to ask the General Assembly to annex Mansfield to Tolland County. That occurred the following year.

The town of Mansfield contains the community of Storrs, which is home to the main campus of the University of Connecticut and the associated Connecticut Repertory Theatre. Villages within the town include Gurleyville and Mansfield Center, Mansfield Hollow, and Atwoodville.

== History ==
English settler-immigrants arrived in the area that is now Mansfield in the late 17th century. The Town of Mansfield was legally incorporated in 1702, and the Storrs family history dates back to that time. Samuel Storrs migrated from Nottinghamshire, England to Massachusetts in 1663, then moving to the area in 1698.

The first silk mill in the United States was constructed in Mansfield and financed by Pilgrim descendant William Fisk. The town, along with neighboring Willimantic, played an important role in the manufacture of thread and other textiles. Though nothing but the foundation remains of the mill, Mansfield has held onto several other historic landmarks. A fully intact gristmill, dating to 1835, the Gurleyville Gristmill is the only one of its kind in Connecticut. Built on the Fenton River, this stone grist mill remains intact with the original equipment. There are tours available May through October. The adjacent miller's house is the birthplace of former Connecticut governor Wilbur L. Cross, (1931 to 1939). More recent yet rare nonetheless, the Mansfield Drive-in, a drive-in movie theater, and Lucky Strike Lanes, a duckpin bowling alley, are among the last of their breed in the nation, with only 41 congress-certified alleys currently (2016), down from 450 in 1963.

The Mansfield Training School and Hospital, situated on more than 1,000 acres (4.0 km^{2}) and encompassing 85 buildings, was operated by the Connecticut Department of Developmental Services until its closure, after legal challenges, in 1993. Four years later, the former director and a once staunch advocate of the school declared, "The Mansfield Training School is closed: the swamp has finally been drained." Since then, the site has been allowed to deteriorate, though the University of Connecticut has been slowly finding uses for and fixing up many of the buildings. The school, with its eerie overturned wheelchairs and neo-classical hospital, remains a magnet for adventurous locals, the police, and amateur photographers.

Located directly across U.S. Route 44 from the Mansfield Training School is the Donald T. Bergin Correctional Institution, which closed in August 2011. The Level 2 facility housed approximately 1,000 inmates. It served as a pre-release center for inmates who were approaching the end of their sentence or a period of supervised community placement.

On the Northeastern edge of town (Mount Hope Village), the playwright, actor and producer Willard Mack owned a large estate (originally built by William Fisk). Mack permitted his other various friends and associates to board and breed their thoroughbreds on his property. One of these, boxing legend Jack Dempsey, made continual use of these facilities until Mack's death in the mid-1930s. During Mack's stewardship of this property, the famous Arabian Stallion "Broomstick", sire of numerous Kentucky Derby and Triple Crown winning thoroughbreds, was also a temporary resident. The property has since been purchased and maintained by private owners.

Development has increased in recent years, leading to the imposition of a temporary moratorium on new subdivisions, as well as additional land acquisition. Town-provided services, including free community wireless Internet access became available at the Mansfield Community Center, the Mansfield Town Hall, the Mansfield Senior Center, and the Mansfield Public Library in the late 2010s.

Media outlets have previously reported Mansfield to be a safe place. In 2005, Slate named Storrs "America's Best Place to Avoid Death Due to Natural Disaster." and in 2025, rankings webpage Niche included Mansfield and the village of Mansfield Center in its list of the top 100 places to live in Connecticut.

=== On the National Register of Historic Places ===
- Farwell Barn, Horsebarn Hill Rd.
- Gurleyville Historic District, on Gurleyville and Chaffeeville Rds.
- Mansfield Center Cemetery, jct. of Storrs and Cemetery Rds.
- Mansfield Center Historic District, Storrs Rd.
- Mansfield Hollow Historic District, 86–127 Mansfield Hollow Rd.
- Mansfield Training School and Hospital, jct. of Route 32 & U.S. Route 44
- University of Connecticut Historic District-Connecticut Agricultural School, roughly Route 195/Storrs Rd. at North Eagleville Rd.

== Geography ==
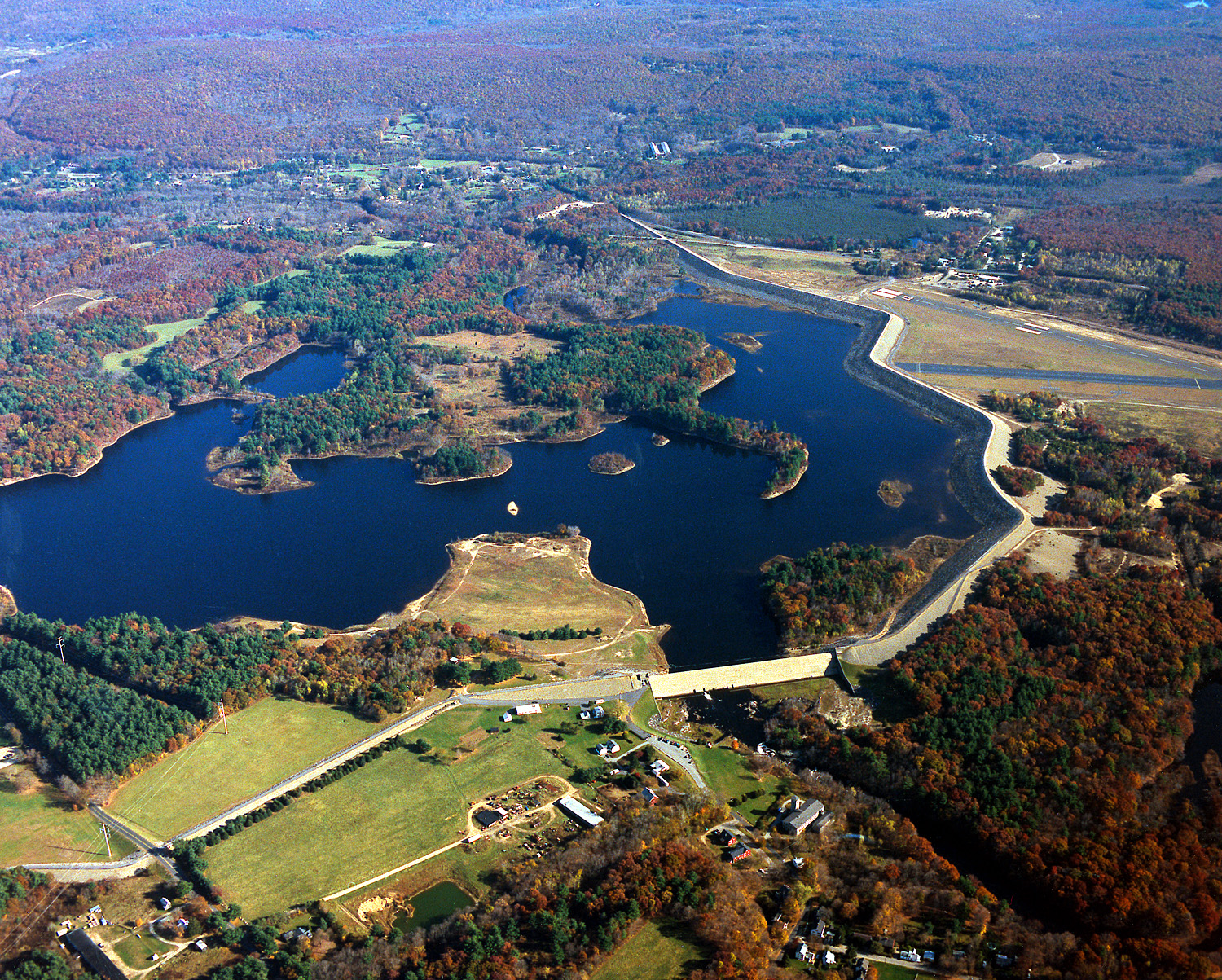
The Mansfield Hollow Dam, constructed in 1952, impounds the waters of the Natchaug, Fenton and Mt. Hope Rivers.

According to the United States Census Bureau, the town has a total area of 45.5 square miles (117.8 km^{2}), of which, 44.5 square miles (115.2 km^{2}) of it is land and 1.0 square miles (2.7 km^{2}) of it (2.26%) is water. Mansfield Hollow Lake rests on the border between Mansfield and Willimantic.

Mansfield is listed as a member town of the Last Green Valley National Heritage Corridor and is sometimes considered a part of Connecticut's Quiet Corner, a colloquial designation for the more rural, northeastern part of the state.

=== Settlements ===
- Atwoodville
- Bassettsville
- Celeron Square
- Conantville
- Dunhamtown
- Eagleville
- Four Corners
- Freedom Green
- Gurleyville
- Holinko-Hunting Lodge
- Industrial Tract
- Mansfield Center
- Mansfield Depot
- Mansfield Hollow
- Merrow
- Mount Hope
- Perkins Corner
- Spring Hill
- Storrs
- Wormwood Hill

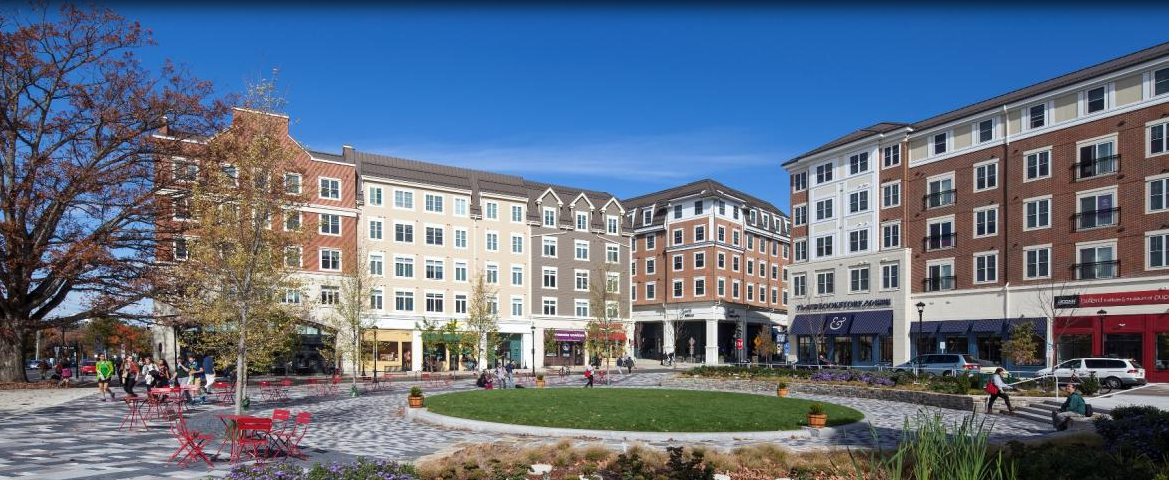
Betsy Paterson Square as seen from Storrs Road

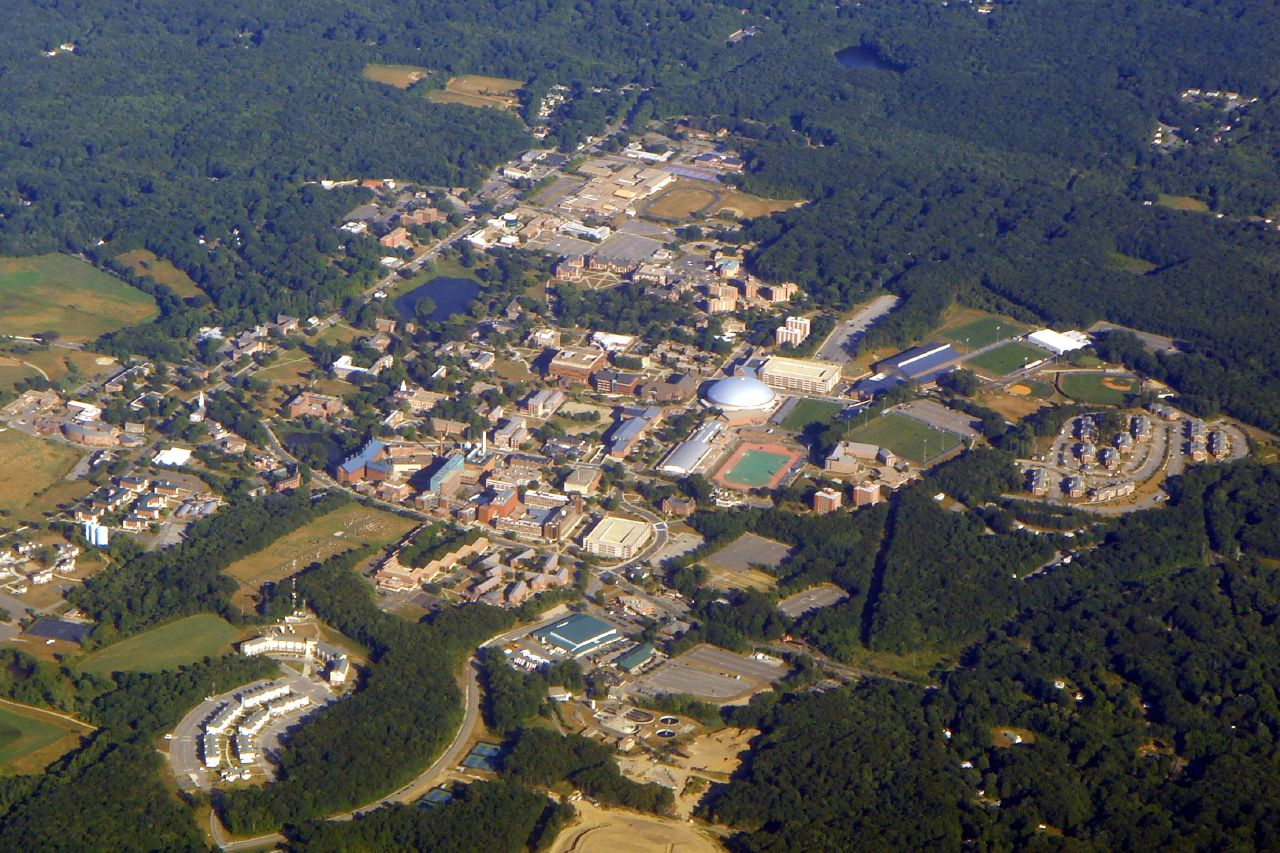
An overhead view of the main University of Connecticut campus, seen here in 2007

Storrs, the largest of the town's settlements, is an unincorporated village within Mansfield anchored economically and demographically by the main campus of the University of Connecticut. The community was named after Charles and Augustus Storrs, two brothers who founded the university (originally called the Storrs Agricultural College) by giving the land (170 acres (0.69 km^{2})) and $6,000 to the State of Connecticut in trust in 1881.

Due to its association with UConn and the Huskies' popular basketball programs, it has also taken on the moniker of the "College Basketball Capital of the World".

The "downtown" area of the village is the economic and government center of Mansfield, acting as a mixed-used community development following its construction in the mid-2000s. At the time, the goal of the redevelopment was smart growth through what the Town of Mansfield described as a "livable downtown". Municipal services located there notably include the Avery P. Beck Building (town hall) and Mansfield Community Center on South Eagleville Road, and nearby EO Smith High School on Storrs Road. A number of businesses and apartment are also based in the development, including a number of special-interest stores and restaurants, in addition to some banks, offices and grocery stores.

Betsy Paterson Square, an outdoor green space with sculpture installations, anchors the "downtown" area including and is flanked by a Barnes and Noble-operated UConn Bookstore, the Ballard Institute and Museum of Puppetry, and health service locations operated by UConn Health. The Mansfield Downtown Partnership, a town-affiliated nonprofit organization, hosts community-based events at the square.

Mansfield Center, the town's other major village, is situated southerly and borders Willimantic. Mostly a bedroom community, Mansfield Center does include a business district which features the East Brook Mall and shopping plazas. Original properties located in Mansfield Center, including a historic general store building, are listed as part of the Mansfield Center Historic District.

Both Storrs and Mansfield Center also each contain a related census-designated place.

Mansfield enjoys a moderate amount of protected open space, notably Mansfield Hollow State Park, town parks and preserves, and numerous Joshua's Trust properties in addition to UConn-owned and maintained properties including Spring Valley Student Farm. Three large private farms operate within Mansfield, including Mountain Dairy, which has been producing and processing milk under the stewardship of one family since 1871.

== Infrastructure and Transportation ==
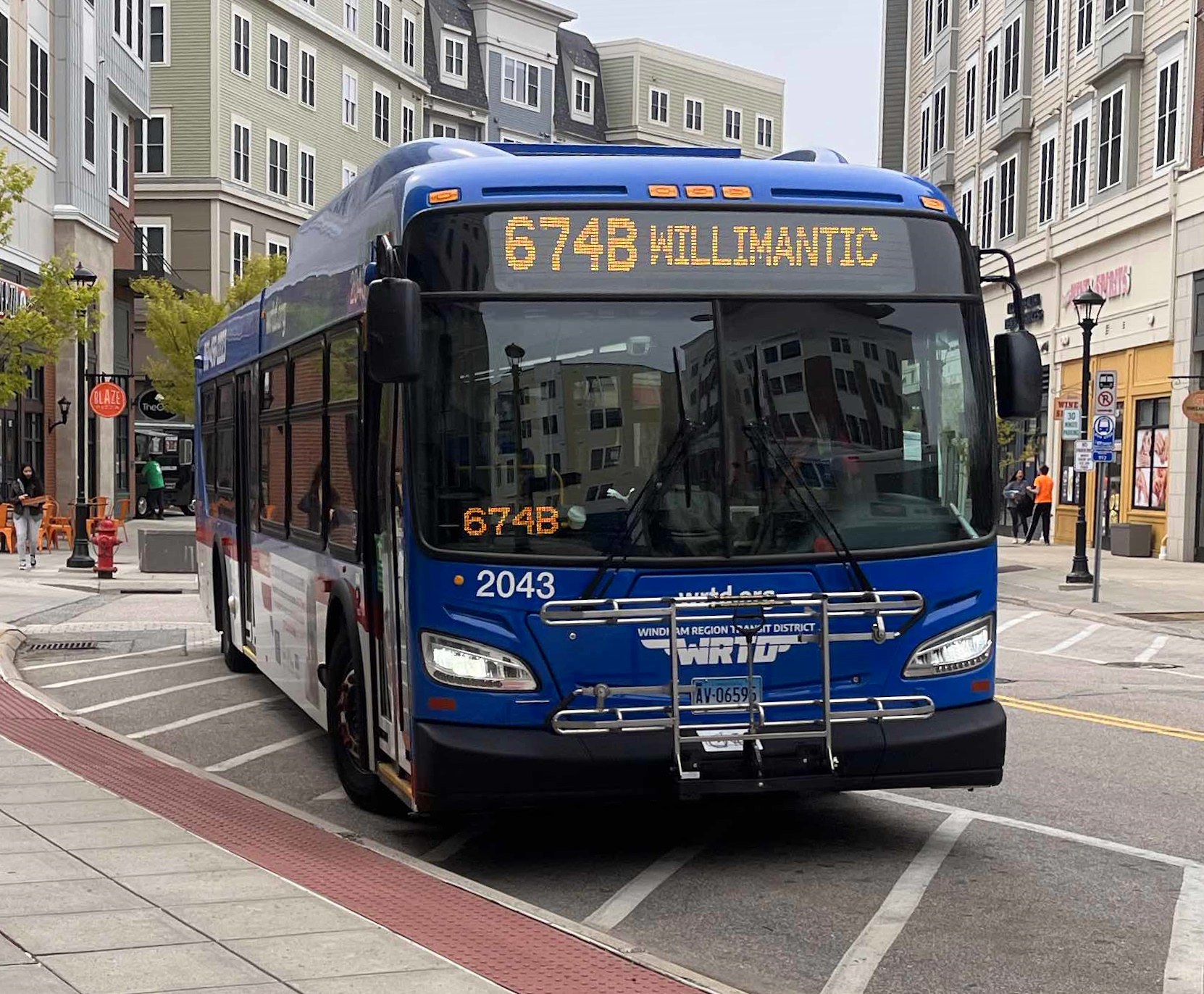
Windham Region Transit District bus

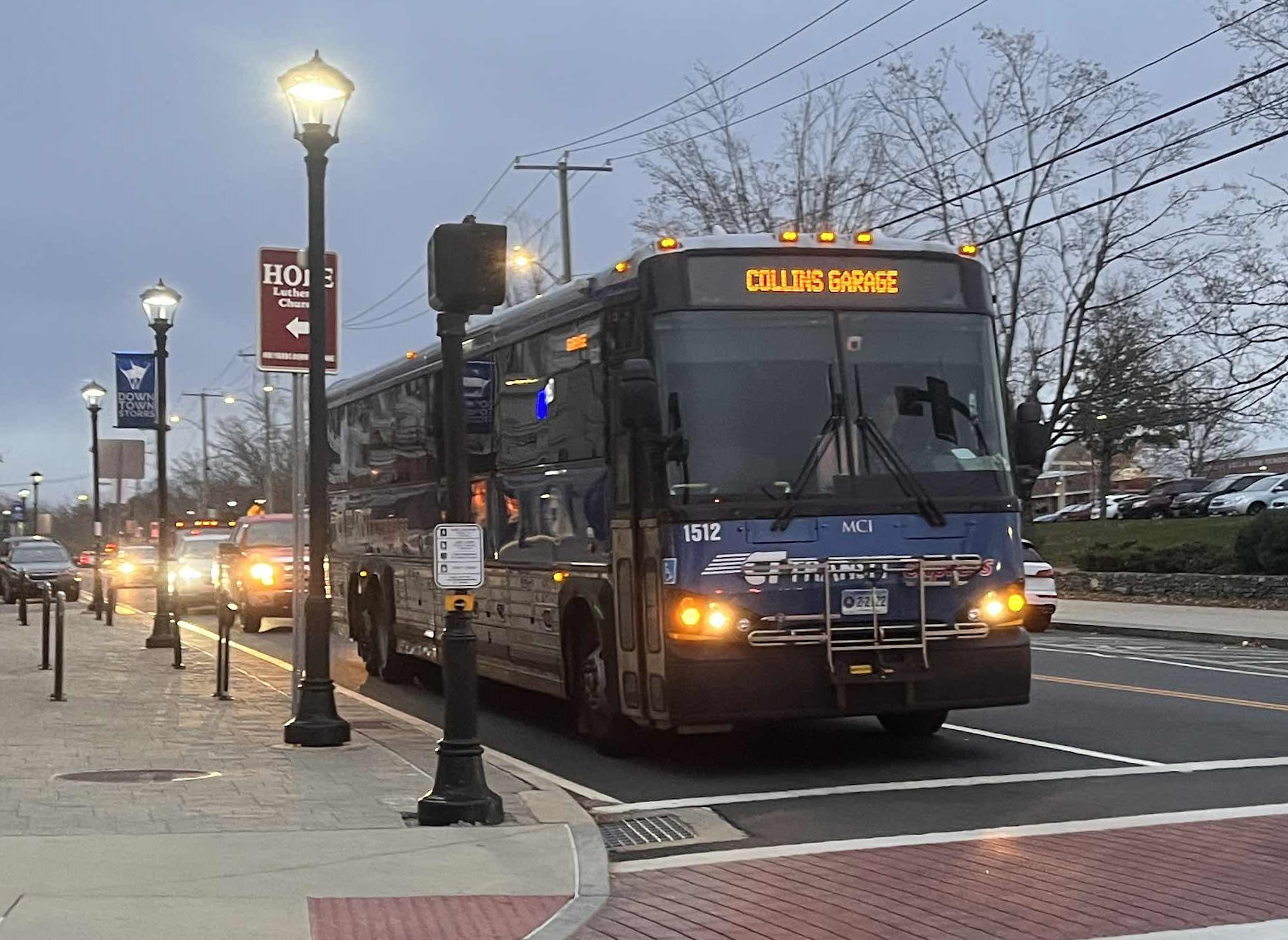
CT Transit Hartford Express bus

U.S. Route 6 passes through the southern end of Mansfield as an isolated stretch of divided highway, part of the planned but never realized interstate between Hartford and Providence, Rhode Island. Construction began midway between the two major cities, far removed from population centers. When opposition arose and complications developed, the project was shelved, with only stranded parts of the highway completed; the freeway portion extends from the nearby town border of Columbia and Willimantic and ends in North Windham.

The community includes the intersection of state roadways U.S. Route 44 and Connecticut Route 32 in Mansfield Depot. Route 6 has an interchange with Storrs Road (Connecticut Route 195) on the town border with Willimantic; Storrs Road runs north and intersects with Route 44 at the "four corners", a colloquial name for the intersection, continuing through Coventry and Tolland to meet with Connecticut Route 74.

Willington Hill Road (Connecticut Route 320) and South Eagleville Road (Connecticut Route 275) act as major roadways to access the village from the north and south, respectively. Willington Hill Road begins in nearby Willington and merges into Storrs Road at the "four corners". South Eagleville Road offers a junction to Storrs Road from Route 32 in Coventry.

=== Intermodal services ===
The Nash-Zimmer Transportation Center, located on Royce Circle in the "downtown" area, acts as a de-facto hub for intermodal services, with a parking garage and waiting room.

Local bus service is provided by the Windham Region Transit District (WRTD), with two routes that connect to local points of interest. Route 674 travels toward Willimantic, including stops at the local Big Y plaza and the East Brook Mall, and route 675 offers stops along Hunting Lodge Road toward Mansfield Depot. WRTD also operates HuskyGo shuttle service in partnership with the UConn transportation services office, which provides access to on-campus locations and stops along Storrs Road (Connecticut Route 195) for students.

Express bus service is provided by CT Transit as route 913, which travels between Storrs and Hartford. The express route makes limited stops at commuter lots in Tolland, Vernon, and Manchester connecting at The Shoppes at Buckland Hills toward Hartford Union Station. A number of runs begin and end at the Sigourney Street CT Fastrak station in Hartford.

Limited intercity bus service is provided by Peter Pan Bus Lines, who run extra routes to Hartford Union Station and to Providence, RI.

=== Former and proposed services ===
Until 1955 inter-city train service was available nine miles to the south at Willimantic station on the New Haven Railroad's Nutmeg line and on trains between Waterbury, Hartford and Boston. From 1991 to 1995, Willimantic was served by Amtrak's Montrealer service. Schedules would refer to the stop as "Willimantic, CT (Storrs) [sic]", owing to the stop's close proximity to the village and use by students.

A plan for expanded passenger rail service in eastern Connecticut through to Vermont, the Central Corridor Rail Line, includes reviving service to Willimantic and the construction of a new Storrs stop. Other proposals for local and high-speed rail projects in Connecticut have included planned stops in Storrs and in nearby Tolland to service UConn.

== Demographics ==
Historical population
Census	Pop.	Note	%±
1840	2,276		—
1850	2,517		10.6%
1860	2,165		−14.0%
1870	2,401		10.9%
1880	2,154		−10.3%
1890	1,911		−11.3%
1900	1,827		−4.4%
1910	1,977		8.2%
1920	2,574		30.2%
1930	3,349		30.1%
1940	4,559		36.1%
1950	10,008		119.5%
1960	14,638		46.3%
1970	19,994		36.6%
1980	20,634		3.2%
1990	21,103		2.3%
2000	20,720		−1.8%
2010	26,543		28.1%
2020	25,892		−2.5%
U.S. Decennial Census

As of the census of 2000, there were 20,720 people, 5,291 households, and 3,121 families residing in the town. Mansfield's population increased 27.5% between 2000 and 2010, making it the second fastest-growing municipality in Connecticut for that period after Oxford. The population density was 466.0 inhabitants per square mile (179.9/km^{2}). There were 5,481 housing units at an average density of 123.3 per square mile (47.6/km^{2}). The ethnic makeup of the town was 83.91% White, 4.87% African American, 0.20% Native American, 7.15% Asian, 0.05% Pacific Islander, 1.88% from other races, and 1.94% from two or more races. Hispanics or Latinos of any race were 4.31% of the population.

There were 5,291 households, out of which 28.1% had children under the age of 18 living with them, 48.4% were married couples living together, 7.7% had a female householder with no husband present, and 41.0% were non-families. 27.0% of all households were made up of individuals, and 10.3% had someone living alone who was 65 years of age or older. The average household size was 2.40 and the average family size was 2.92.

The age distribution, heavily influenced by UConn, is 13.3% under 18, 44.8% from 18 to 24, 18.9% from 25 to 44, 14.1% from 45 to 64, and 8.9% who were 65 years or older. The median age was 22 years. For every 100 females, there were 98.1 males. For every 100 females age 18 and over, there were 96.4 males.

The median income for a household in the town was $48,888, and the median income for a family was $69,661. Males had a median income of $42,154 versus $32,292 for females. The per capita income for the town was $18,094. About 4.7% of families and 14.2% of the population were below the poverty line, including 6.7% of those under age 18 and 5.5% of those age 65 or over.

== Government ==
Voter Registration and Party Enrollment as of October 25, 2005
Party	Active Voters	Inactive Voters	Total Voters	Percentage
Democratic	3,683	251	3,934	36.93%
Republican	1,322	78	1,400	13.14%
Unaffiliated	4,709	606	5,315	49.90%
Minor parties	3	0	3	0.03%
Total	9,717	935	10,652	100%

== Education ==
Elementary and middle school-aged residents attend schools in the Mansfield School District.

All of Mansfield's middle-schoolers attend to Mansfield Middle School, the 2007–2008 Connecticut Association of Schools (CAS) School of the Year, and the recently built Mansfield Elementary School.

Both Annie E. Vinton School and Dorothy C. Goodwin school have been rebranded to be separate campuses of Mansfield Elementary School. As of now, they are being used for storage. Southeast Elementary School has been replaced with Mansfield Elementary School.

High school-aged residents attend EO Smith High School of the Regional School District 19.

== Economy ==
=== Top employers ===
Top employers in Mansfield according to the town's 2024 Comprehensive Annual Financial Report

#	Employer	# of Employees
1	University of Connecticut	5,314
2	Natchaug Hospital, Inc.	250–499
3	Town of Mansfield	419
4	United Services	250–499
5	Regional School District No. 19 Baukus Healthcare @ Home	203
6	Mansfield Nursing and Rehab Center	100–249
7	Big Y	100–249
8	Price Chopper	100–249
9	Baukus Healthcare @ Home	100–249

== Notable people ==
- Charlie Jane Anders (born 1969), science fiction author and commentator; born in Mansfield
- Elijah Porter Barrows (1807–1888), clergyman and writer; born in Mansfield
- William Bonin (1947–1996), serial killer and rapist; lived in Mansfield
- Wilbur Lucius Cross (1862–1948), well-known literary critic and Governor of Connecticut from 1931 to 1939; born in Mansfield
- Rivers Cuomo (1970–present), lead guitarist, lead singer, and frontman of rock band Weezer; lived in Mansfield
- Charles Davis (1789–1863), Associate Justice of the Vermont Supreme Court; born in Mansfield
- Dorothy Goodwin (1914–2007), Connecticut state representative and advocate for public education; lived in Mansfield
- Benjamin Hanks (1755–1824), goldsmith, instrument maker, and first maker of bronze cannons and church bells in America; born in Mansfield
- George S. Moulton (1829–1882), businessman, Connecticut State Representative and State Senator; born in Mansfield
- Charles Emory Smith (1842–1908), Postmaster General, US Ambassador to Russia and newspaper editor; born in Mansfield
- Peter Tork (1942–2019), actor and musician, best known as a member of The Monkees; lived and died in Mansfield
- Annie E. Vinton (1869–1961), postmistress and politician; lived most of her life in the Eagleville district of Mansfield
- Archibald Welch (1794–1853), physician and state politician
- Henry Kirke White Welch (1821-1870), lawyer and politician
- Lyle Yorks (born 1970), retired midfielder in soccer; born in Mansfield

== See also ==
- WHUS FM 91.7
