= Mansfield Hollow State Park =

State park in Tolland County, Connecticut

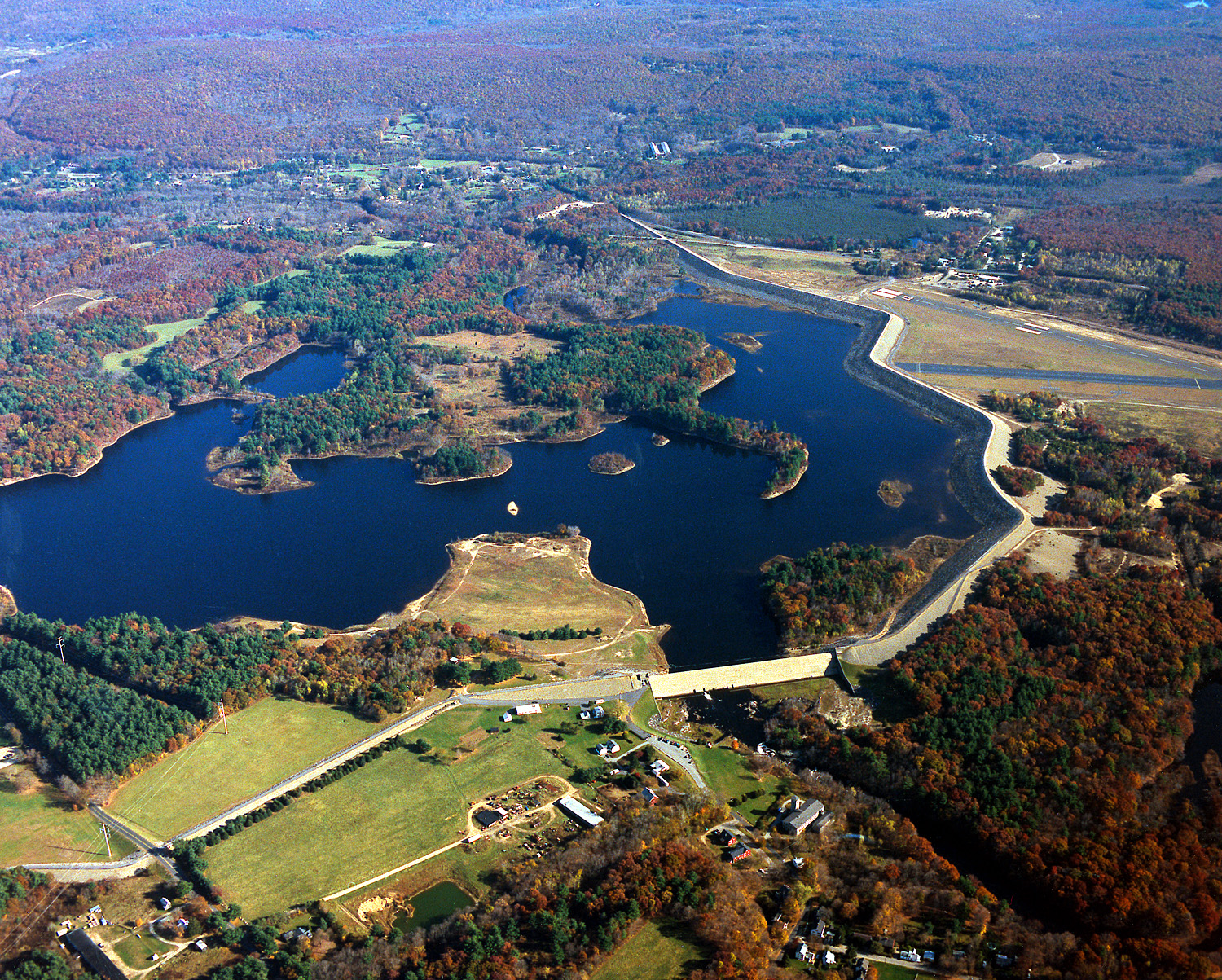
- Mansfield Hollow Lake

- Location within Connecticut Location within the United States
- Location: Mansfield, Connecticut, United States
- Coordinates: 41°46′06″N 72°10′32″W (boat ramp)
- Area: 251 acres (102 ha)
- Elevation: 210 ft (64 m)
- Established: 1952
- Administrator: Connecticut Department of Energy and Environmental Protection
- Designation: Connecticut state park
- Website: Official website

Mansfield Hollow State Park is a public recreation area occupying 251 acres (102 ha) of leased lands on the western shore of 500-acre (200 ha) Mansfield Hollow Lake in the town of Mansfield, Connecticut. The state park is one portion of the 2,300 acres (930 ha) leased by the Connecticut Department of Energy and Environmental Protection from the U.S. Army Corps of Engineers for recreational and wildlife management purposes. Geologic features of the park include remnants of the last glacial period, when retreating glaciers left kames, eskers, and kettles. Recreational opportunities include facilities for boating, fishing, picnicking, hiking, mountain biking, and cross-country skiing. The park is traversed by the southeastern leg of the Nipmuck Trail.
