= Carmen Guerrero =

Director of the Caribbean division of the Environment Protection Agency

Carmen R. Guerrero Pérez

Secretary of Natural and Environmental Resources of Puerto Rico
- In office January 2, 2013 – June 15, 2016
- Governor: Alejandro García Padilla
- Deputy: Julio Méndez
- Preceded by: Daniel J. Galán Kercado
- Succeeded by: Nelson J. Santiago Marrero

Personal details
- Born: Carmen R. Guerrero Pérez; November 15, 1974 (age 51) San Juan, Puerto Rico
- Party: Democratic
- Other political affiliations: Popular Democratic Party
- Education: University of Michigan (BA) University of Puerto Rico (MPL) Yale University (MEM)

Carmen R. Guerrero Pérez (born November 15, 1974) was the former Secretary of the Puerto Rico Department of Natural and Environmental Resources and as of June 2016, is the director of the Caribbean Environmental Protection Division of the Environmental Protection Agency.

== Education ==
Guerrero-Pérez obtained her Bachelor of Arts in Environmental Public Policy from the University of Michigan in Ann Arbor. She has a Master of Planning in Environmental Planning from the University of Puerto Rico Graduate School of Planning and a Master of Environmental Management from Yale School of Forestry and Environmental Studies in Connecticut. She also participated in sustainable development study programs in Costa Rica and at the University of California, Berkeley. She is a licensed professional planner in Puerto Rico.

== Career ==
Carmen returned to Puerto Rico to join the San Juan Bay Estuary as a Project Coordinator. For more than 15 years, she served as an environmental and conservation planner and consultant to numerous organizations and government entities, among them: Conservation Trust of Puerto Rico, El Yunque National Forest, Corporación del Proyecto ENLACE del Caño Martín Peña, University of Puerto Rico, Banco Popular Foundation, and The Nature Conservancy. Carmen founded an environmental nongovernmental organization that provided volunteer advisory services on environmental and sustainable development issues to local communities across Puerto Rico.

== Environmental Protection Agency Caribbean Division ==
On May 19, 2016, Guerrero-Pérez was appointed director of the Caribbean Environmental Protection Division of the Environmental Protection Agency by the regional administrator Judith A. Enck.

== Secretary of the Department of Natural and Environmental Resources ==
On May 13, 2013, Guerrero-Pérez was unanimously confirmed as Secretary of Natural and Environmental Resources of Puerto Rico. As a secretary, she managed to increase the protection by law of the island's territory from 8% to 16%. She worked on initiatives such as the Model Forest, the karst area management plan, the protection by law of the Northeast Ecological Corridor, among others.

=== Model Forest ===
Under her mandate, she succeeded in legislating Act 182-2014, known as the "Model Forest Act of Puerto Rico", the legislation creates a National Model Forest ecological corridor encompassing 390,000 acres, 31 municipalities, and interconnecting 19 protected natural areas. The purpose of the office is to protect and seek the sustainable development of the communities located in the geographic area of the Model Forest, through four fundamental principles of sustainability: local economic development, conservation of resources, education and participation of host communities.
