= David Martyn Smith =

Forestry academic (1921–2009)

- Born: March 10, 1921; Bryan, Texas
- Died: March 7, 2009 (aged 87); Hamden, Connecticut
- Education: B.S.; M.F.; Ph.D.
- Alma mater: University of Rhode Island, Yale University
- Occupations: Forester and educator
- Known for: Pioneer in field of forest stand dynamics; author of The Practice of Silviculture

David Martyn Smith (March 10, 1921 – March 7, 2009), a United States forester and educator, was a founder of the field of forest stand dynamics. He was the Morris K. Jesup Professor of Silviculture at Yale University, the manager of the university's forest holdings, and an author of a widely used forest management text.

== Early life and education ==
He was born in Bryan, Texas and grew up in Kingston, Rhode Island. He graduated with a Bachelor of Science degree from the University of Rhode Island in 1941. During World War II he trained at New York University in meteorology and served as a meteorologist for the United States Army Air Forces in Europe and North Africa. In 1946 he earned a Master of Forestry degree from the Yale School of Forestry, writing his thesis on the impact of the Hurricane of 1938 on New England forests. He earned his Ph.D. degree at Yale in 1950, writing on how small “microsite” variations affect white pine seedlings.

== Professional career ==
Smith joined the faculty at Yale in 1947 as an instructor, after earning his master's degree. He was named an assistant professor in 1951, associate professor in 1957, and full professor in 1963. He assumed the Morris K. Jesup chair of silviculture in 1967. He served as an assistant dean of the School of Forestry from 1953 to 1958.

In 1949 the faculty asked him to manage the degraded Yale-Myers forest. Yale appointed him the Director of School Forests in 1954. Smith advanced the idea of analyzing a forest through reconstruction of its history, coupled with projection of its likely future. This study became known as forest stand dynamics. In his field trips and teaching, Smith showed students how a practical knowledge of botany, ecology, and geology could allow a forester to look at a stand of trees, pick out clues, and make deductions about the forces shaping the forest. His skills in this area led some students to dub him a Sherlock Holmes of the forest.

He also championed the practice of managing multi-species forests. He argued that the monocultures often seen in plantation forestry were not always economically ideal. He observed that the canopies of multi-species forests often develop into layers consisting of different species, even if the trees are all the same age. Careful management can take advantage of this layering and increase the quality and quantity of resources that the forest can produce.

Smith's mentor at the Yale School of Forestry, Professor Ralph Chipman Hawley, had written a text, The Practice of Silviculture, first published in 1921. Smith assisted Hawley in updating the text for the sixth edition in 1954 and became its junior author. He was the sole author of the seventh (1961) and eighth (1986) editions. Following Hawley's example, Smith took on junior authors for the ninth edition (1997). At the time of Smith's death, the Yale University public affairs office called the book the most widely used forestry text in the world.

== Public Service ==
Smith served as Director or President of the Connecticut Forest and Park Association; the Hamden Land Conservation Trust; and Connwood Foresters Inc., the nation's oldest forest landowners' cooperative. In the 1960s he served on the Connecticut Pesticide Investigating Committee. He also advised the US Forest Service and forestry agencies in Australia and British Columbia. He was a member of the Connecticut Forest Practices Advisory Board during the 1990s. In the early 1970s he was consultant to the President's Advisory Panel on Timber and the Environment.

== Honors ==
He was a Fellow of the Society of American Foresters and received the Distinguished Service Award of its New England section in 1969 and 1993, the only person to receive this award twice. American Forests gave him its Distinguished Service Award in 1990. He received honorary doctorates from the University of Rhode Island (1993) and Bates College (1986).

== Retirement and End of Life ==
Smith retired from teaching at Yale in 1990. He died in Hamden, Connecticut in 2009.
