= George Hewitt Myers =

George Hewitt Myers (September 10, 1875 – December 23, 1957) was an American forester and philanthropist.

He was born in Cleveland, Ohio and graduated from Yale College in 1898 and was the heir to the Bristol-Myers pharmaceutical fortune. He pursued graduate work in English at Harvard from 1898 to 1899. He graduated in the first class of Yale Forest School with a degree of Master of Forestry in 1902. He began acquiring land in Union, Connecticut about 1909. In 1917 the Yale School of Forestry began using the Myers property for field instruction. Around 1929 Myers arranged to donate his forest land to Yale University. The Yale School of Forestry summer camp buildings were constructed on the former Morse farm on the property in 1933; the ownership of the forest was transferred to Yale in 1934. The Yale Myers Forest is managed by the Yale School of Forestry as a multiple-use working forest.

Myers began collecting textiles in 1896 with a rug he bought for his room at Yale University. He donated his collection to found The Textile Museum in Washington, D.C. in 1925, which was housed in the George Hewitt Myers House (2310 S Street), designed by John Russell Pope, which was built in 1912, and in the Martha S. Tucker House (2320 S Street), built in 1908 (Wood, Donn & Deming, architects). Since 2014, the Museum has relocated and is now part of George Washington University.

Myers died in 1957, followed shortly in death by his three children: daughter Persis Chase in 1958, daughter Mary Hewitt in 1959, and daughter Louise Chase in 1960. His wife, Louise Stoddard Chase, assumed Myers' duties on the board of trustees at The Textile Museum from the time of his death through 1958.

When Myers first purchased a few rugs in the 1890s – a group of late 19th-century Turkish and Caucasian village rugs – he did not anticipate buying several thousand textiles. As the years passed and his finances allowed, however, his interests grew to include other types of non-Western textiles along with examples from earlier periods. He began collecting classical silk textiles and carpets from the court workshops of Safavid Iran, Ottoman Turkey and Mughal India; early Islamic textiles, including inscribed textiles called tiraz from western Asia, Egypt and Yemen; late antique textiles from Egypt; Indian resist-dyed cotton fabrics found in Fustat, Egypt; and archaeological textiles from Peru; as well as colonial and later pieces from South and Central America.

In the early 1920s, Myers’ focus shifted to the meaning of these objects, and he set out to widen the scope of knowledge about textiles. He established The Textile Museum in 1925, and by the late 1930s, the breadth and depth of Myers’ textile collection rendered it internationally significant.

When Myers died in 1957, The Textile Museum’s collections included 3,100 textiles from Asia and Africa and 1,500 textiles from the Americas. Today the Museum’s collections include more than 18,000 textiles from around the world.
