= Ashford, Connecticut =

- Town
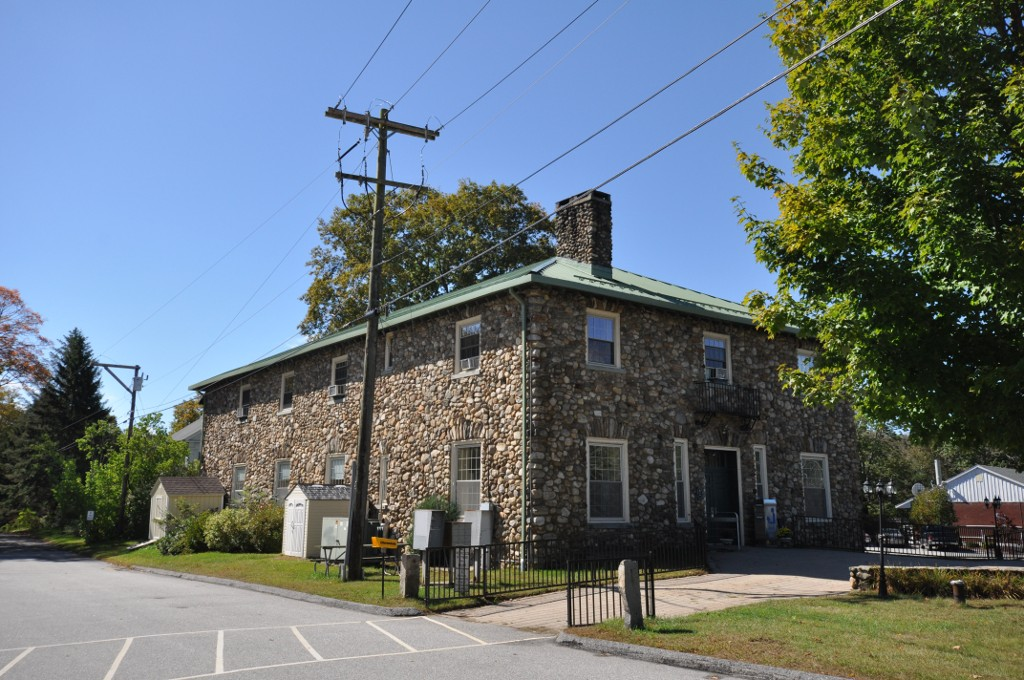
- Babcock Library in Ashford

- Seal

- Interactive map of Ashford, Connecticut
- Coordinates: 41°53′N 72°10′W
- Country: United States
- U.S. state: Connecticut
- County: Windham
- Region: Northeastern CT
- Incorporated: 1714

Government
  - Type: Selectman-Town meeting
  - First Selectman: William R. Falletti (R)
  - Selectman: Cathryn E. Silver-Smith (D)
  - Selectman: Roger T. Phillips (D)

Area
  - Total: 39.5 sq mi (102.3 km^{2})
  - Land: 38.8 sq mi (100.5 km^{2})
  - Water: 0.69 sq mi (1.8 km^{2})
- Elevation: 699 ft (213 m)

Population (2020)
  - Total: 4,191
  - Density: 108.0/sq mi (41.70/km^{2})
- Time zone: UTC−5 (Eastern)
  - Summer (DST): UTC−4 (Eastern)
- ZIP code: 06278
- Area codes: 860/959
- FIPS code: 09-01430
- GNIS feature ID: 212409
- Website: ashfordtownhall.org

Ashford is a town in Windham County, Connecticut, United States. The town is part of the Northeastern Connecticut Planning Region. The population was 4,191 at the 2020 census. It was founded in 1714. Eastford was a part of Ashford until 1847, when the former split off to organize its own town. For this reason, North Ashford is located in northeast Eastford.

Ashford is home to the largest Boy Scout camp in Connecticut, the June Norcross Webster Scout Reservation; to Paul Newman's Hole in the Wall Gang Camp for children with cancer and other serious illnesses; to the Salvation Army CONNRI Lodge and Conference Center; and to the Evangelical Christian Center, a retreat, camp and conference center.

== History ==
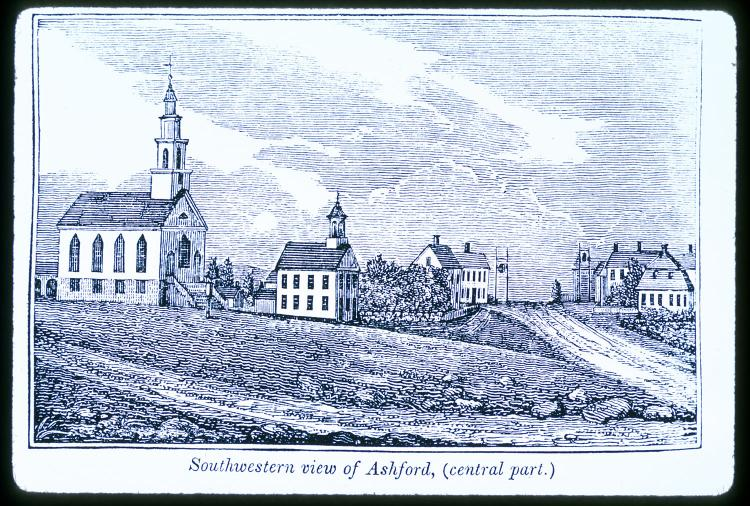
Center of town in 1838

President George Washington, returning from his tour of the country in the fall of 1789, was chagrined to be involuntarily abandoned in the village on a Sunday. It was contrary to law to hire a conveyance on that day, which was observed by villagers, to Washington's great annoyance.

New Ashford in Massachusetts is named after Ashford, as it was settled in 1762 by people from Ashford.

On July 17, 2018, an EF0 tornado—the first tornado to touch down in Windham County since 1992—struck Ashford Lake and the surrounding neighborhoods, downing trees, damaging homes, and killing three household rabbits.

== Geography ==
According to the United States Census Bureau, the town has a total area of 39.5 square miles (102 km^{2}), of which 38.8 square miles (100 km^{2}) is land and 0.7 square miles (1.8 km^{2}) (1.80%) is water. The Mount Hope River flows through the middle of the town, from north to south, while Bigelow Brook flows along the town's eastern border with Eastford. Ashford has several lakes and ponds, notably Ashford Lake, Lake Chaffee, Knowlton Pond, Rychlings Pond, Halls Pond, Pearson Pond and Morey Pond. The community of Lake Chaffee surrounds the lake of the same name.

Boston Hollow, a deep ravine, is located in Ashford, in the Yale-Myers Forest. Parts of Natchaug State Forest and Nipmuck State Forest are also located in Ashford, and both the Natchaug Trail and the Nipmuck Trail runs through the town. Joshua's Tract Conservation and Historic Trust has several nature preserves in town. Snow Hill located in the northwest corner of the town, is the highest point in Windham County at 1,210 feet.

=== Flora and fauna ===
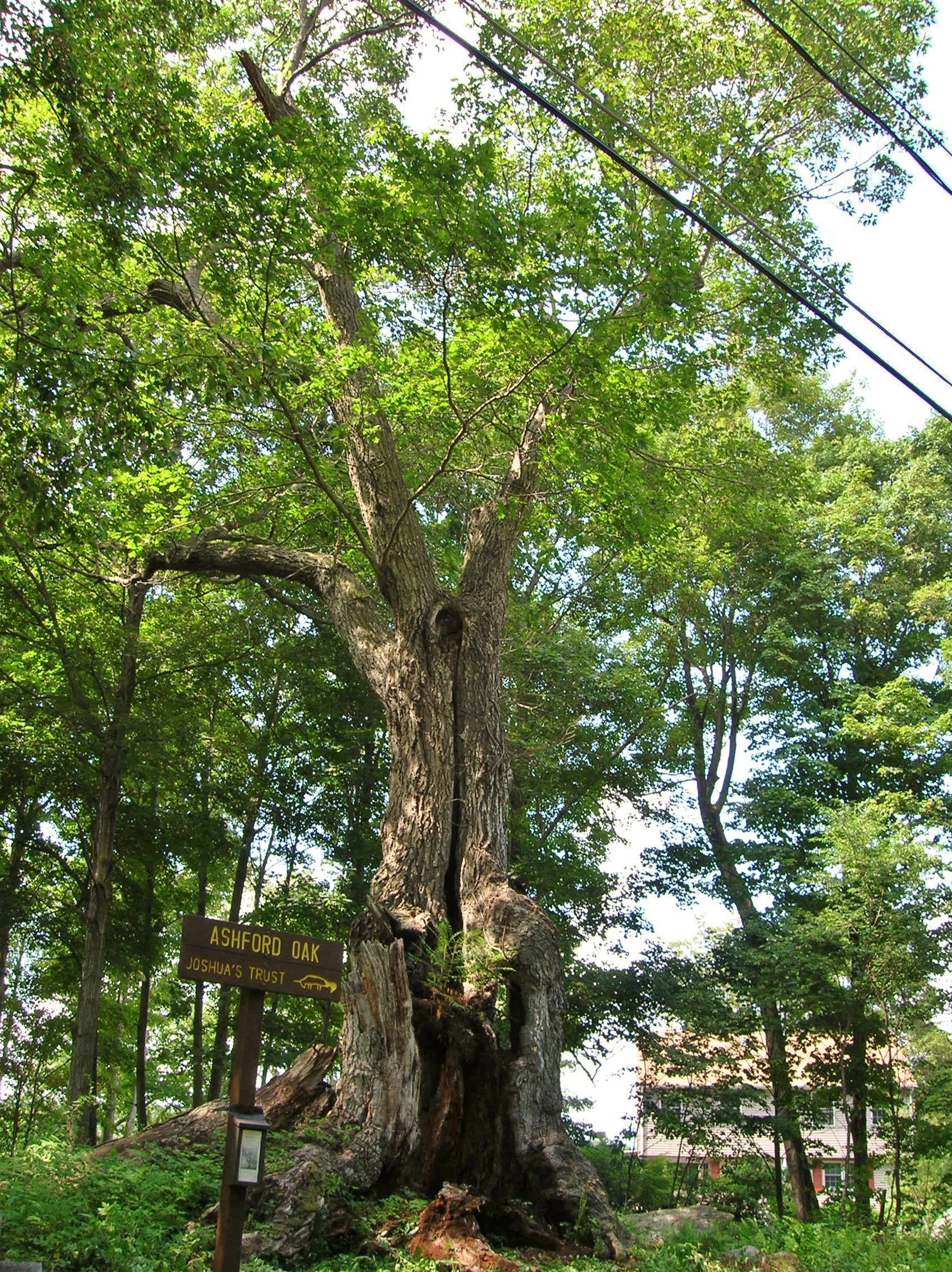
Ashford Oak

Ashford is located in the northeastern coastal forests, which is a temperate broadleaf and mixed forest ecoregion. Ashford is home to the Yale-Myers Forest, which is used by the Yale School of Forestry & Environmental Studies for scientific research and education. The most famous tree in town is the Ashford Oak, a very large and old northern red oak with a trunk that is eight meters in circumference.

The last recorded sighting of periodic cicadas belonging to Brood XI of the 17-year variety occurred in Ashford in 1954 along the Fenton River.

== Demographics ==
Historical population
Year	Pop.	±%
1830	2,661	—
1840	2,651	−0.4%
1850	1,295	−51.2%
1860	1,231	−4.9%
1870	1,241	+0.8%
1880	1,041	−16.1%
1890	778	−25.3%
1900	757	−2.7%
1910	668	−11.8%
1920	673	+0.7%
1930	726	+7.9%
1940	704	−3.0%
1950	845	+20.0%
1960	1,315	+55.6%
1970	2,156	+64.0%
1980	3,221	+49.4%
1990	3,765	+16.9%
2000	4,098	+8.8%
2010	4,317	+5.3%
2020	4,191	−2.9%

As of 2010 Ashford had a population of 4,317. The racial and ethnic composition of the population was 94.1% white, 1.0% black or African American, 0.4% Native American, 1.3% Asian, 1.1% from some other race, 2.1% from two or more races and 3.5% Hispanic or Latino of any race.

As of the census of 2000, there were 4,098 people, 1,578 households, and 1,084 families residing in the town. The population density was 105.6 inhabitants per square mile (40.8/km^{2}). There were 1,699 housing units at an average density of 43.8 per square mile (16.9/km^{2}). The racial makeup of the town was 95.71% White, 1.00% African American, 0.27% Native American, 1.02% Asian, 0.44% from other races, and 1.56% from two or more races. Hispanic or Latino of any race were 2.00% of the population.

There were 1,578 households, out of which 34.5% had children under the age of 18 living with them, 56.5% were married couples living together, 8.5% had a female householder with no husband present, and 31.3% were non-families. 20.6% of all households were made up of individuals, and 6.0% had someone living alone who was 65 years of age or older. The average household size was 2.59 and the average family size was 3.05.

In the town, the population was spread out, with 25.6% under the age of 18, 8.5% from 18 to 24, 32.0% from 25 to 44, 25.6% from 45 to 64, and 8.3% who were 65 years of age or older. The median age was 36 years. For every 100 females, there were 99.6 males. For every 100 females age 18 and over, there were 98.1 males.

The median income for a household in the town was $55,000, and the median income for a family was $61,693. Males had a median income of $42,117 versus $31,942 for females. The per capita income for the town was $26,104. About 3.4% of families and 5.9% of the population were below the poverty line, including 6.1% of those under age 18 and 8.7% of those age 65 or over.

=== Religion ===
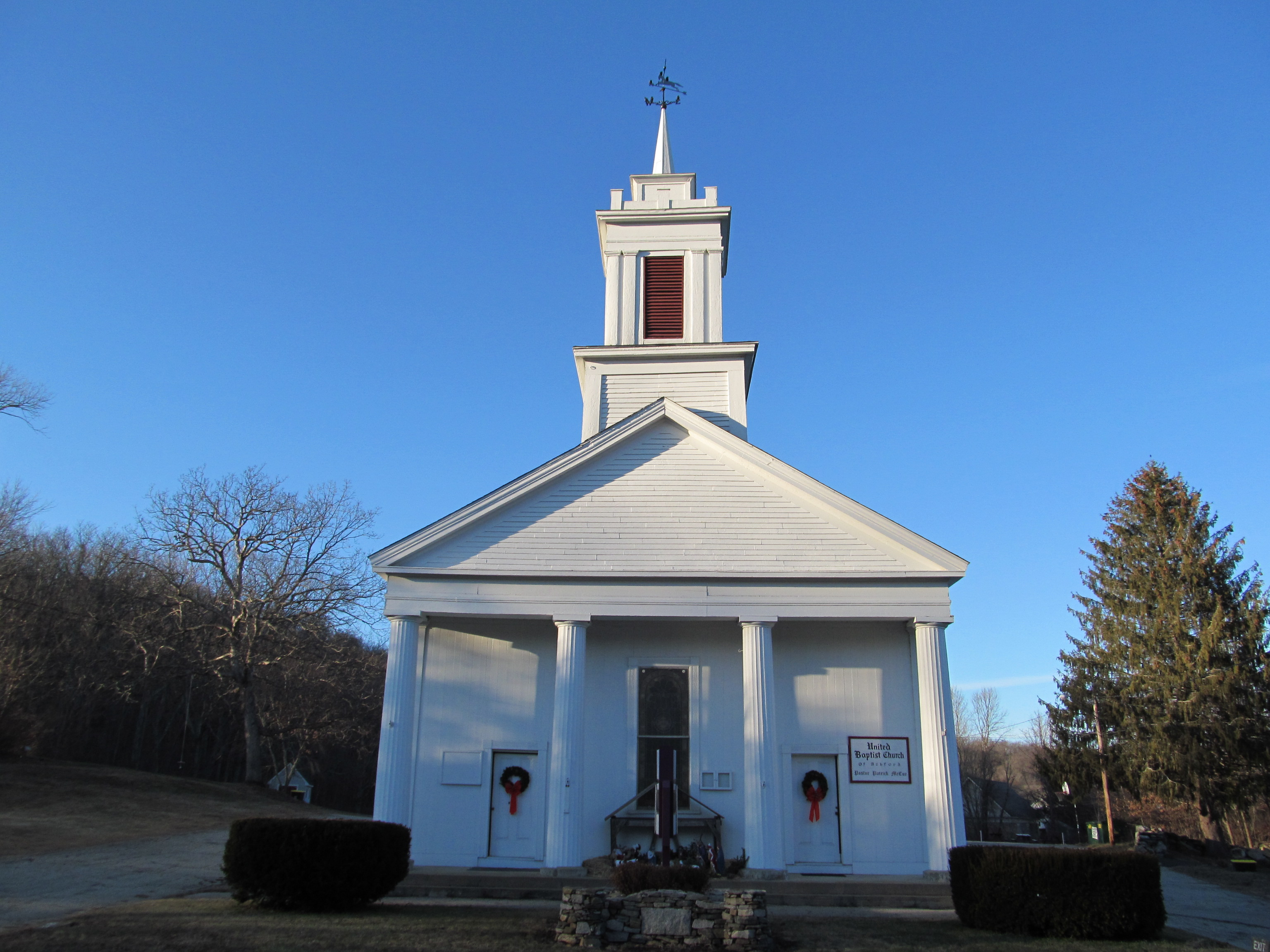
United Baptist Church in the Warrenville section of Ashford

Several churches exist in Ashford. They include the St Philip-Apostle Church (Catholic), Living Proof Church (formerly United Baptist Church of Ashford), The Church of Jesus Christ of Latter-day Saints, and Westford Congregational Church.

== Arts and culture ==
Sites listed on the National Register of Historic Places include:

- Ashford Academy – Fitts Road (added 1988)
- Church Farm – 396 Mansfield Road (added December 17, 1988)
- Knowlton Memorial Hall – 25 Pompey Hollow Road (added April 17, 1994)
- Mixer Tavern – 14 Westford Road (added April 17, 1994)

== Government ==
Voter Registration and Party Enrollment as of October 29, 2019
Party	Active voters	Inactive voters	Total voters	Percentage
Democratic	964	79	1,043	34.12%
Republican	625	47	672	21.98%
Unaffiliated	1,126	176	1,302	42.60%
Minor Parties	32	7	39	1.27%
Total	2,747	309	3,056	100%

The town of Ashford is heavily Democratic and has been since the 1930s. Ashford was one of only eight towns in Connecticut that voted for George McGovern over Richard Nixon in the 1972 election. In recent elections, Ashford has become one of the few remaining blue towns in Windham County, which has shifted rightward at the federal level. In 2016, Ashford was one of only three Windham County towns, along with Windham and Pomfret, to back Hillary Clinton over Donald Trump, albeit with a plurality. In 2020, Joe Biden increased the Democratic vote total in the town while the county at large stayed red.

== Education ==
Elementary and middle school-aged residents attend Ashford School, the town's only school, built in 1951 to replace the old Ashford Academy schoolhouse. This school educates students from Pre-K through grade eight. In February 1979, the town's board of education considered closing the school in response to a budget crisis.

High school-aged residents may attend E. O. Smith High School in Mansfield, CT, part of Regional School District 19. They also can go to Windham Technical High School, ACT. and Ellis Technical High School.

== Notable people ==
- Francis Bugbee (1794–1877), lawyer, judge and politician
- Walter Eli Clark (1869–1950), journalist, last governor of the District of Alaska and the first governor of the Alaska Territory
- Emeline Horton Cleveland (1829–1878), physician and college professor, the first woman on record to perform major surgery
- Galusha A. Grow (1822–1907), speaker of the U.S. House of Representatives from 1861 to 1863
- John Keyes (1744–1824), first adjutant general of the State of Connecticut
- Elias Keyes, (1758–1844), United States Congressman from Vermont
- Thomas Knowlton (1740–1776), military officer in the American Revolution, who led the Knowlton's Rangers, America's first Army intelligence unit
- Nathaniel Lyon (1818–1861), the first Union general to be killed in the American Civil War
- Paul Newman (1925–2008), award-winning actor, film director and philanthropist. A seasonal resident of Ashford from the opening of the Hole in the Wall Gang Camp in 1988
- Eliphalet Nott (1773–1866), president of Union College, and from 1829 to 1845 simultaneously was president of Rensselaer Polytechnic Institute. Inventor of the first stove for anthracite coal
- Caroline Lathrop Post (1824–1915), poet
- James Hamilton Shegogue (1806–1872), painter
- Solomon Spalding (1761–1816), writer
- John H. Trumbull (1873–1961), the 70th governor of Connecticut
- Valerie Wilson Wesley (born 1947), mystery writer
- Edward W. Whitaker (1841–1922), Brevet Brigadier General; soldier and Medal of Honor recipient
