= Mixer Tavern =

- U.S. National Register of Historic Places
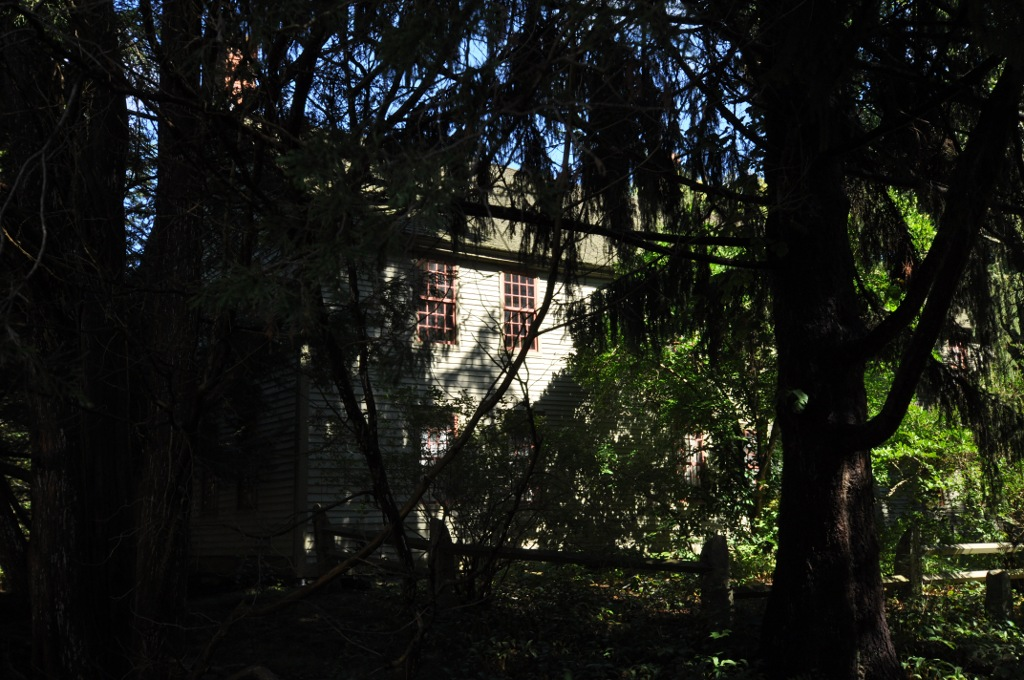

- Location within Connecticut Location within the United States
- Location: 14 Westford Road, Ashford, Connecticut
- Coordinates: 41°51′56″N 72°9′33″W
- Area: 13 acres (5.3 ha)
- Built: c. 1710
- Architectural style: Colonial
- NRHP reference No.: 94000253
- Added to NRHP: March 17, 1994

The Mixer Tavern is a historic tavern, now a private residence, at 14 Westford Road in Ashford, Connecticut. Portions of the building date to 1710, making it one of Ashford's oldest buildings. It is also distinctive for its well-preserved tavern features, and its long history (into the 20th century) as a traveler's accommodation and local meeting point. The building was listed on the National Register of Historic Places in 1994.

== Description and history ==
The Mixer Tavern is located near what is now the village center of Ashford, at the northeast corner of Westford Road and Pompey Hollow Road (United States Route 44). It is oriented facing south toward Pompey Hollow Road behind a thick screen of trees. It is a 2 1/2-story wood-frame structure, five bays wide, with a side-gable roof and center chimney. Additions extend the size an additional two bays to the west, and also to the rear. The interior is based on a typical Georgian center chimney plan, except the right side has a small chamber behind the front parlor space, from which it is separated by a half-wall with a folding door. The left front parlor space has particularly fine woodwork in the fireplace surround. The kitchen space at the rear provides access to a distinctive walk-in storage vault that is built into the chimney. This feature is an enlarged version of storage spaces sometimes seen in older chimneys, a clear indication of the building's early use as a tavern.

The oldest portions of the building are traditionally dated to 1710, when John Mixer purchased the property (then 100 acres (40 ha), now just 13), and applied for a license to operate a tavern. In addition to its well-preserved vernacular 18th-century architecture (including rarely-preserved tavern features), it is the only known tavern to operate in what is now Ashford for many years, and continued in that role into the early 20th century. It underwent a significant restoration effort in the 1920s.

== See also ==
- National Register of Historic Places listings in Windham County, Connecticut
