= Boston Hollow =

Valley in Connecticut, United States

Coordinates: 41.9266°N 72.1658°W

Boston Hollow is a deep ravine in Ashford, Connecticut. It is a unique location in several ways. In geological terms it is an ancient fault in the Central Maine Terrane of the eastern highlands of Connecticut. More specifically, it lays within the Bigelow Brook Formation which consists of high grade pelitic schists and gneisses. Although there are many faults in this region, none is as deeply cleft, well pronounced, nor well preserved as this hollow.

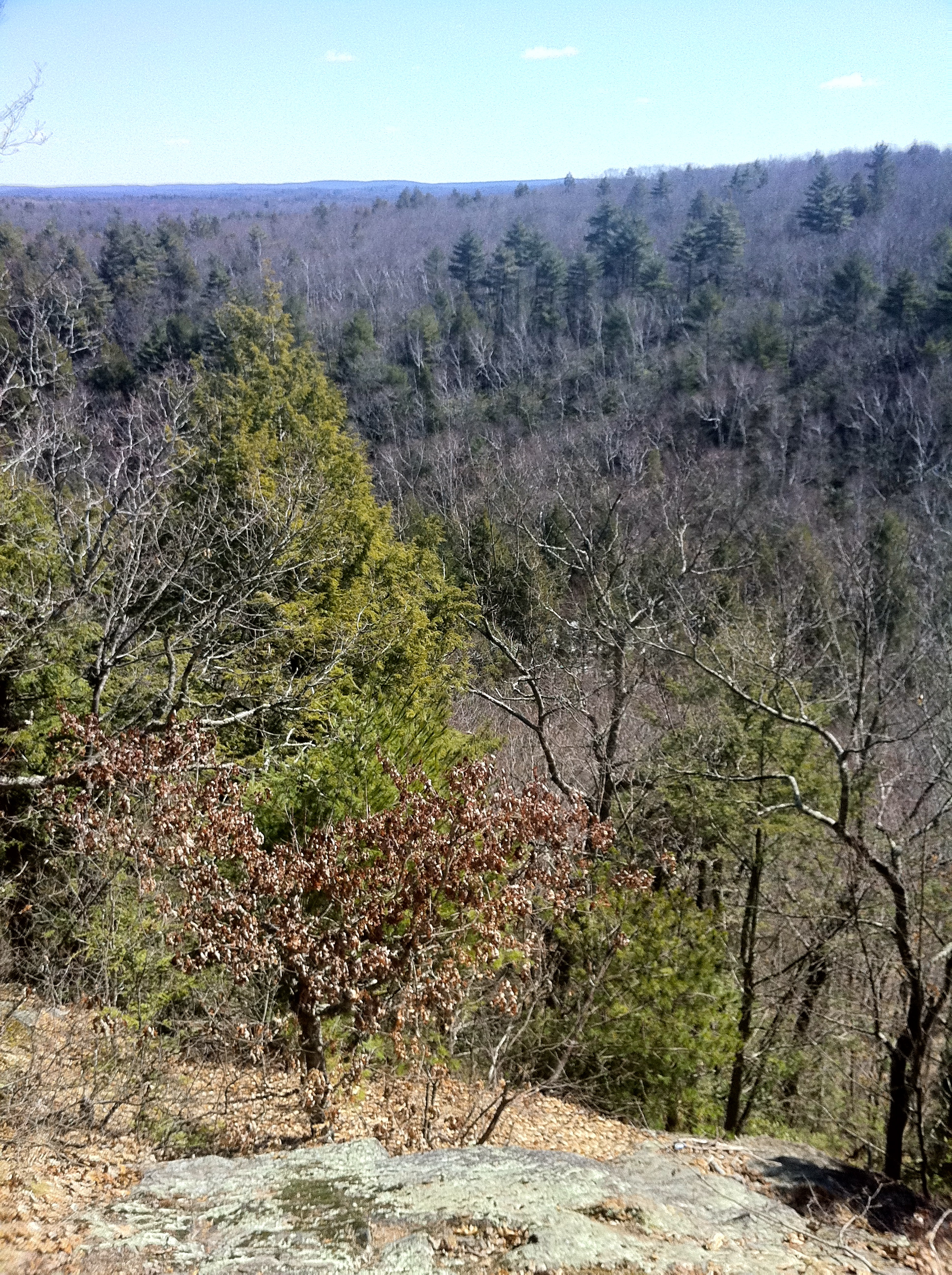
Above Boston Hollow Road on the Yale-Myers Forest's Nipmuck Trail ridge.

== Accessibility ==
Boston Hollow is approached from the southwest, from Westford, by unpaved Boston Hollow Road. This is a portion of the historic Center Turnpike, constructed in 1827, that was formerly a major route from Boston to Hartford. The road follows a nearly straight course through the bottom of the hollow beside a little, unnamed brook for about two thirds of its passage. Then the brook peters out and a height of land is achieved. Continuing along the road towards the northeast, another swath in the ground forms but this is rarely filled with water. The second gully leads into a swamp at the end of the hollow. Near the end of the hollow a ten-acre (4 ha) parcel of land is situated. This land has an inactive gravel pit against the hollow wall. The only house in the area is located just past this land. The brook and the second swath as well as the house and the private land are all on the west side of the hollow.

== Geography ==
The geography of Boston Hollow is characterized by the deep fault-cleft running almost perfectly straight in the northeast direction. The basement of the hollow is approximately 630 feet (190 m) above sea level at the southern head, and 600 feet (180 m) at the swamp at the northern exit. The height of land is about 700 feet (210 m) above sea level. The hollow defined by the distance the road passes through its bottom is nearly one mile (1,600 m) long. The elevation change through the bottom of the hollow is therefore quite gradual. The width of the base from wall to wall varies from 100 to 500 feet (30 to 152 m).

On the west side there are swampy and stagnant wetlands through much of the course of the hollow brook as the water flow is too little and the incline is too slight to adequately drain the area. On either side of the low land the walls of the hollow rise swiftly. On the west side they rise most steeply to a height of about 850 feet (260 m). The elevation gain is so rapid that a hike up the steep faces is in fact a climb. Towards the middle-northern end of the western hollow the wall is sheer rock for spaces of more than twenty feet (6.1 m) vertically and these overhangs are at such an incline that they form concave overhangs beneath which angular blocks of fallen stone lie. The top of the west ridge is undulating with there being several extant peaks or heights. This massif has no proper name.

On the east side the hollow wall rises directly from the road. This wall is steep but there is less exposed ledge than there is on the west side. After a relatively short distance of grave incline the hill rises less steeply. This hill is given the appellation Turkey Hill. However, Turkey Hill attains a greater height than the west ridge, reaching higher than 950 feet (290 m) above sea level. There are several pond-like swamps on the plateau of Turkey Hill.

The property that contains the hollow is part of the Yale-Myers Forest. This is a 7,800 acres (32 km^{2}) forest owned by Yale University and used for teaching and scientific research as well as commercial timber production. There is also land owned by Hull Forest Products of Pomfret, CT in the area but this is not in the hollow proper. The Yale-Myers Forest is private land, but it is not posted as 'No Trespassing'. There is one marked trail that goes through the Boston Hollow. This is the Nipmuck Trail. It enters the hollow from the southeast after passing over the glacier scoured ridges and plateau of Turkey Hill. The trail crosses Boston Hollow road at the middle northern end of the Hollow and swiftly ascends the west ridge.

On the west side of the trail for the first part of its passage on the west ridge there is a little valley or sump that is often filled with water during the winter and other wet periods. There has been ice that can be walked on in this sump as late as March, attesting to the coldness of this area. The trail ascend a series of ridges to a summit. This summit is shear bedrock and devoid of trees in the southeast direction (i.e. facing into the hollow). To the west there is a brief tree-covered plateau after which the topography slopes down to a large swamp. The trail continues after the summit in a southwest direction then turns in a serpentine arc and descends northwest of the hollow onto Barlow's Mill road.

== Wildlife ==
The flora and fauna of the hollow include species typical of southern New England, however, more boreal species are also found in this rugged region. The base of the hollow in densely forested with hemlock trees. These evergreens block much of the little light that reaches into this narrow chasm, therefore the hollow's floor is always quite dark. above the low lands, on the hollow ridges hardwoods grow, the most common of which is red oak. The forest around the summit of the west ridge consists mainly of short red oaks. On the side of Turkey Hill facing the west ridge the tree growth is similar except that quite a few paper birch have colonised this slope whereas there are hardly any on the west ridge. The groves of paper birches make a pleasing visage in the fall when they are viewed from the summit of the west ridge.

Notable flora in Boston Hollow includes the mountain maple, a shrub-like tree that commonly grows in northern New England. Fauna consist of white-tailed deer, coyotes, and other animals of New England. It is probable that there are moose and American black bear inhabiting the dense forest preserves surrounding the hollow.
