= Ashford Academy =

- U.S. National Register of Historic Places
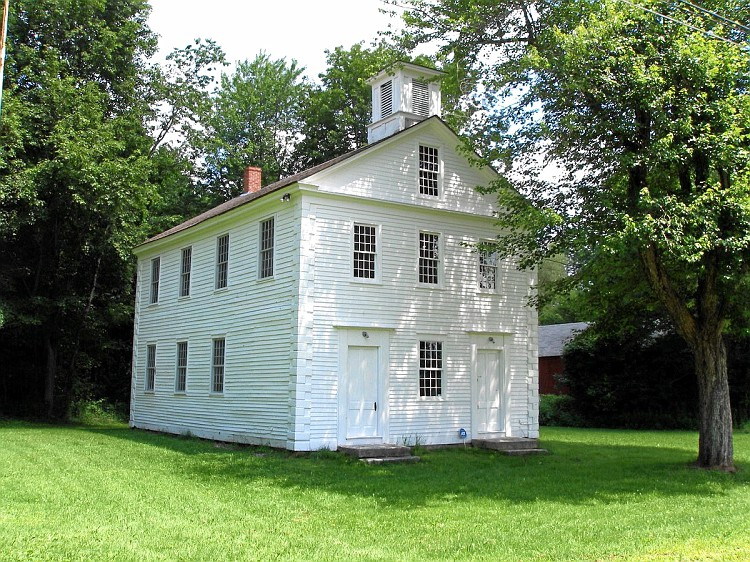

- Location within Connecticut Location within the United States
- Location: Fitts Road, Ashford, Connecticut
- Coordinates: 41°52′22″N 72°7′25″W
- Area: 1 acre (0.40 ha)
- Built: 1825
- Architectural style: Federal
- NRHP reference No.: 88002649
- Added to NRHP: December 29, 1988

The Ashford Academy is a historic school building on Fitts Road in Ashford, Connecticut. Built in 1825, it is the oldest public building in the town, serving as a school until 1949. The building was listed on the National Register of Historic Places in 1988.

== Description and history ==
The former Ashford Academy building is located in the village center of Ashford, on the north side of Fitts Road, near its junction with Ashford Center Road (United States Route 44). It overlooks the latter road across a triangular portion of the town green. It is a 2 1/2-story wood-frame structure, with clapboard siding, and a gable roof topped by a small square belfry tower. The building corners have wooden panels fashioned in the manner of quoins, rising to a fully pedimented gable. The front facade is three bays wide, with entrances in each of the outside bays. The entrances are flanked by wide paneled pilasters and topped by narrow projecting cornices. The interior consists of a relatively narrow vestibule area, with classroom spaces on both the first and second floors. Original features include the wide floorboards and simple window trim, while the student desks and other furnishings date to the early 20th century.

Built in 1825, it is believed to be the town's oldest public building. Its location was at that time amid other trappings of the town center, including a church and taverns, most of which are no longer standing. The building was used for both public and private classes until 1875, and as an exclusively public district school until 1949. It has unusually fine Federal period detailing for a school of its period, which were generally more utilitarian in appearance.

== See also ==
- National Register of Historic Places listings in Windham County, Connecticut
