= Knowlton Memorial Hall =

- U.S. National Register of Historic Places
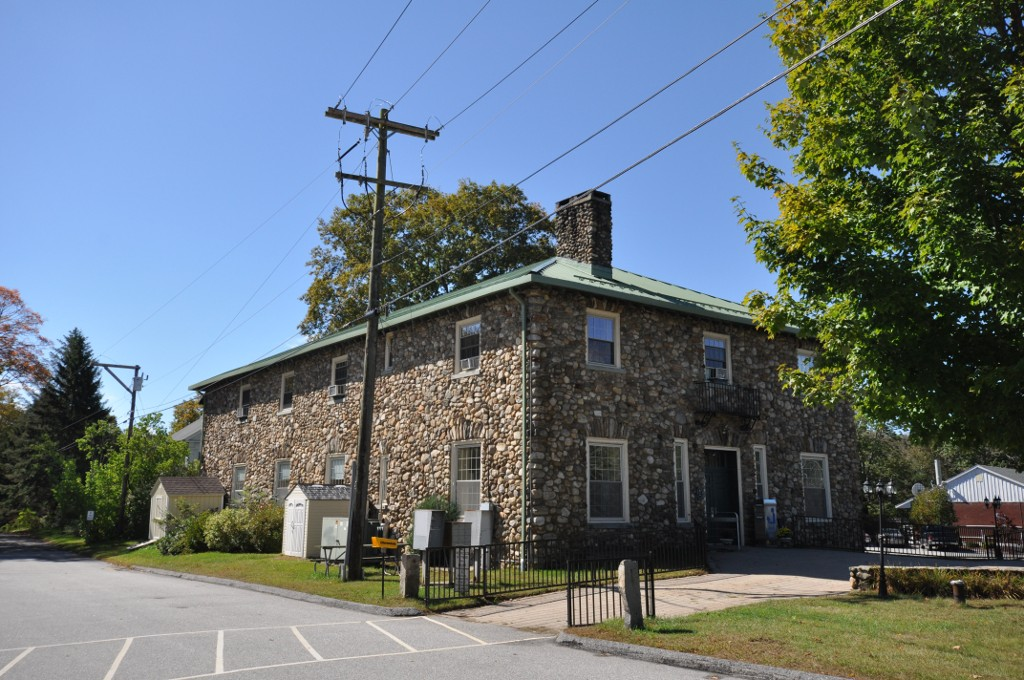

- Location within Connecticut Location within the United States
- Location: 5 Town Hall Road, Ashford, Connecticut
- Coordinates: 41°51′49″N 72°9′42″W
- Area: 1 acre (0.40 ha)
- Built: 1924
- Architect: Loud, Herbert
- Architectural style: Rustic
- NRHP reference No.: 94000252
- Added to NRHP: March 17, 1994

Knowlton Memorial Hall, also known as Ashford Town Hall, is located at 5 Town Hall Road in Ashford, Connecticut. It was built in 1924 to house town offices and the public library. Construction was made possible by a gift from Charles Knowlton, whose family had lived in the area since the 18th century. When built, it featured a number of modern innovations, including electrical service (generated on site), and steam heat. In addition to town offices and the library, the building also has an auditorium which is used for town meetings. The building was listed on the National Register of Historic Places in 1994.

== Description and history ==
Knowlton Memorial Hall stands prominently in the center of Ashford's main village, at the southeast corner of Pompey Hill Road (United States Route 44) and Town Hall Road. It is a two-story structure, built of randomly laid fieldstone with wide mortared joints, with a hip roof. The roof eaves show exposed rafter ends, and there is a stone chimney at one end of the building. Windows are placed in openings that have slightly segmented-arch headers with brick-like soldier stones forming the arch, and bluestone lintels. The main entrance is flanked by sidelight windows, each placed in a separate opening.

The town of Ashford has a long history, having been incorporated in 1714, but its town center was lost to Eastford when that town was incorporated in 1847. The town, largely agricultural for much of its history, remained without a well-defined town center until this building was erected in 1924. It was a gift of Charles Knowlton, an Ashford native who made a large fortune in business associated with a textile mill in Putnam. Although he lived in New York City, he frequently summered in Ashford, and gave this building as a gift to the town in honor of his father, John Knowlton, and his ancestor, the American Revolutionary War hero Thomas Knowlton. It was designed by Herbert Loud, an architect based in New York.

== See also ==
- National Register of Historic Places listings in Windham County, Connecticut
