= Bowen Forest =

Coordinates: 43.444°N 72.804°W

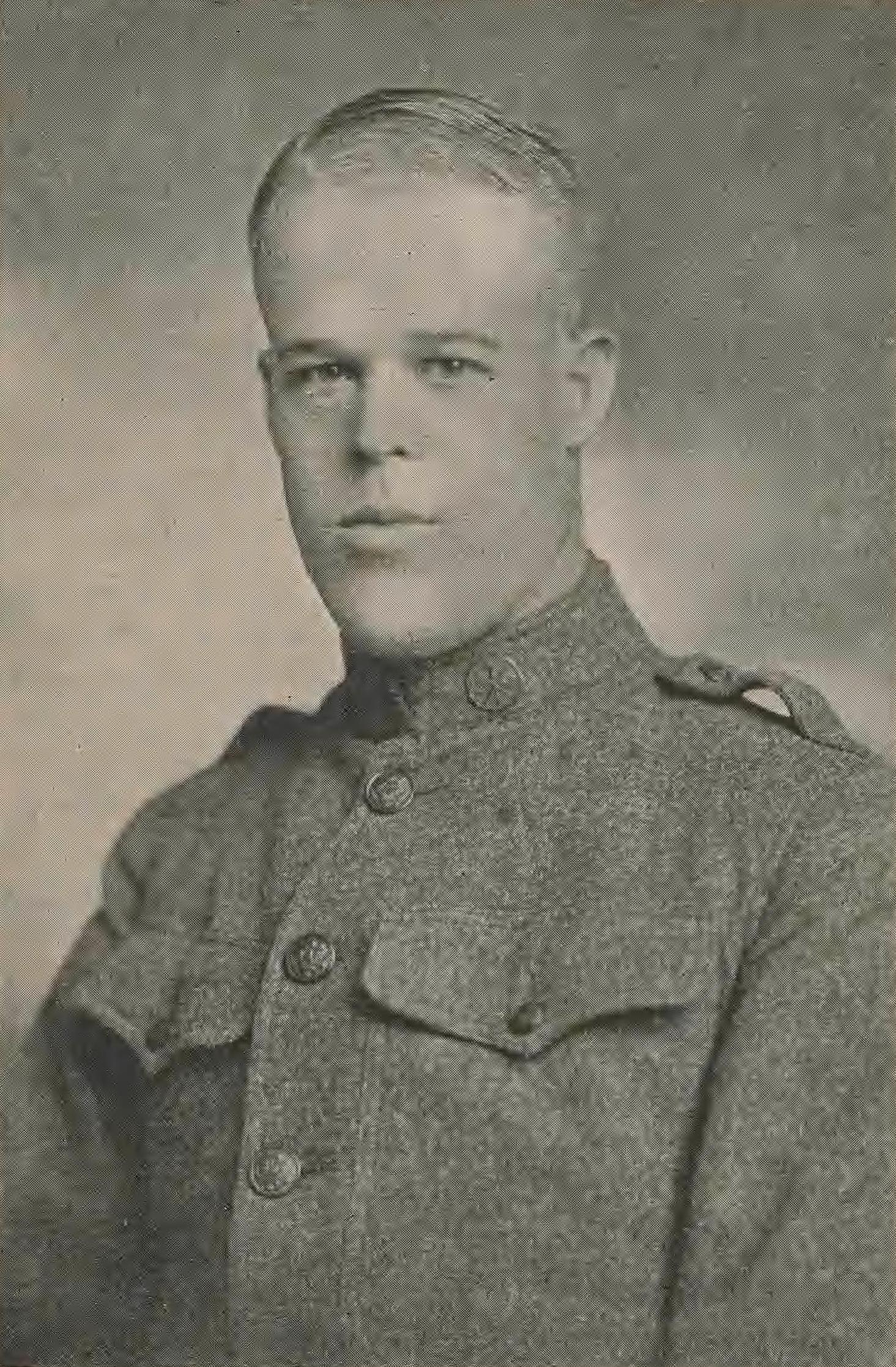
Joseph Brown Bowen

Bowen Forest in Mount Holly, Vermont, United States, is a component of the Yale Forests system. This system also includes the 7,900 acres (32 km^{2}) Yale-Myers Forest located in the towns of Union, Ash-ford, East-ford, and Woodstock, Connecticut, and the 1,100 acres (4.5 km^{2}) Yale-Tourney Forest in the towns of Swanzey, New Hampshire and Keene, New Hampshire. Bowen Forest is 462 acres (1.87 km^{2}) in size, and like the other Yale Forests, is owned by Yale University and administered by the Yale School of the Environment. It was given to the university in 1922 by Elma S. Bowen in honor of her son, Joseph Brown Bowen, a 1917 graduate of the School of Forestry who was killed in France during World War I.
