= Church Farm =

- U.S. National Register of Historic Places
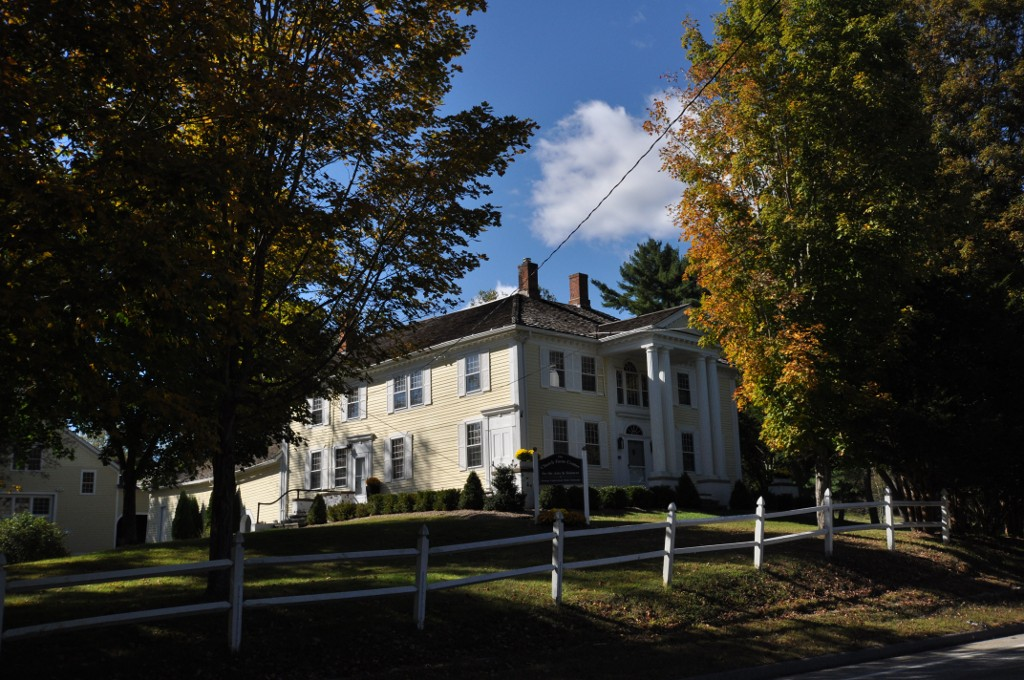

- Location within Connecticut Location within the United States
- Location: 396 Mansfield Road, Ashford, Connecticut
- Coordinates: 41°50′21″N 72°10′11″W
- Area: 5 acres (2.0 ha)
- Built: 1821
- Architectural style: Colonial Revival, Federal
- NRHP reference No.: 88002650
- Added to NRHP: November 17, 1988

The Church Farm is a historic former farm at 396 Mansfield Road in Ashford, Connecticut. Built in 1821, the main house is a remarkably sophisticated example of Federal period architecture in a rural setting. The property was listed on the National Register of Historic Places in 1988. It is now the Church Center of Eastern Connecticut State University.

== Description and history ==
The former Church Farm is located in the rural town of Ashford, on the west side of Mansfield Road (Connecticut Route 89), south of its Junction with Varga Road. The farmstead is set on 5 acres (2.0 ha), part of a historically larger property. The farm complex includes a hip-roofed Federal style house, built in 1821, but with a c. 1791 ell attached, and a c. 1930 Colonial Revival front portico. Outbuildings include an 1895 barn, and an old woodshed and privy of uncertain age.

The house is a remarkably elegant Federal structure for a relatively remote rural location, and reflects trends in agriculture including its construction by Zalmon Aspinwall, and its conversion to a gentleman's farm late in the 19th century by John W. Church. The ell of the house is believed to incorporate a building constructed on the site by Robert Snow, to whom Aspinwall was related by marriage. Aspinwall's daughter Lucinda married John Church, who raised sheep and produced cheese on 135 acres (55 ha). Subsequent generations of Churches maintained the property more as a country retreat for the family, as the family business shifted to retail clothing.

== See also ==
- National Register of Historic Places listings in Windham County, Connecticut
