= Lake Chaffee (CDP), Connecticut =

Census-designated place in Connecticut, United States

Lake Chaffee, Connecticut
- Census-designated place
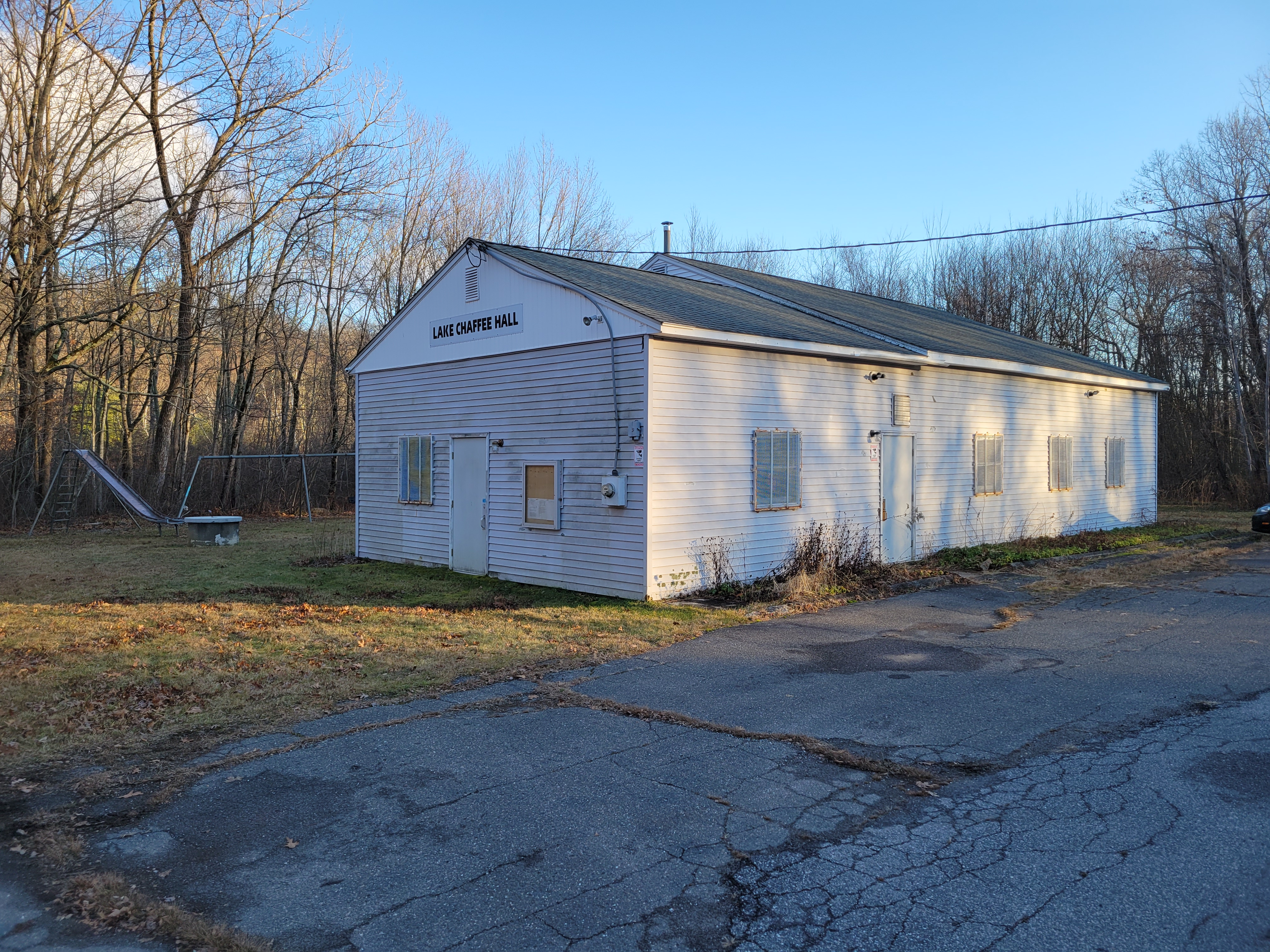
- Lake Chaffee Hall

- Location within Connecticut Location within the United States
- Coordinates: 41°56′19″N 72°11′45″W
- Country: United States
- State: Connecticut
- County: Windham
- Town: Ashford

Area
  - Total: 0.21 sq mi (0.55 km^{2})
  - Land: 0.13 sq mi (0.34 km^{2})
  - Water: 0.081 sq mi (0.21 km^{2})
- Elevation: 856 ft (261 m)
- Time zone: UTC-5 (Eastern (EST))
  - Summer (DST): UTC-4 (EDT)
- ZIP Code: 06278 (Ashford)
- Area codes: 860/959
- FIPS code: 09-41238
- GNIS feature ID: 2805991

Lake Chaffee is a census-designated place (CDP) in the northwestern part of the town of Ashford, Windham County, Connecticut, United States. It is a residential community surrounding Lake Chaffee, a small water body formed in the early 20th century by damming an area of wetlands. Connecticut Route 89 (Ference Road) forms the eastern edge of the CDP, leading north 1.5 miles (2.4 km) to Interstate 84 and south 6 miles (10 km) to U.S. Route 44 at Warrenville.

Lake Chaffee was first listed as a CDP prior to the 2020 census.
