= George Washington University Museum and Textile Museum =

Textile museum in Washington, DC, US

The George Washington University Museum and The Textile Museum
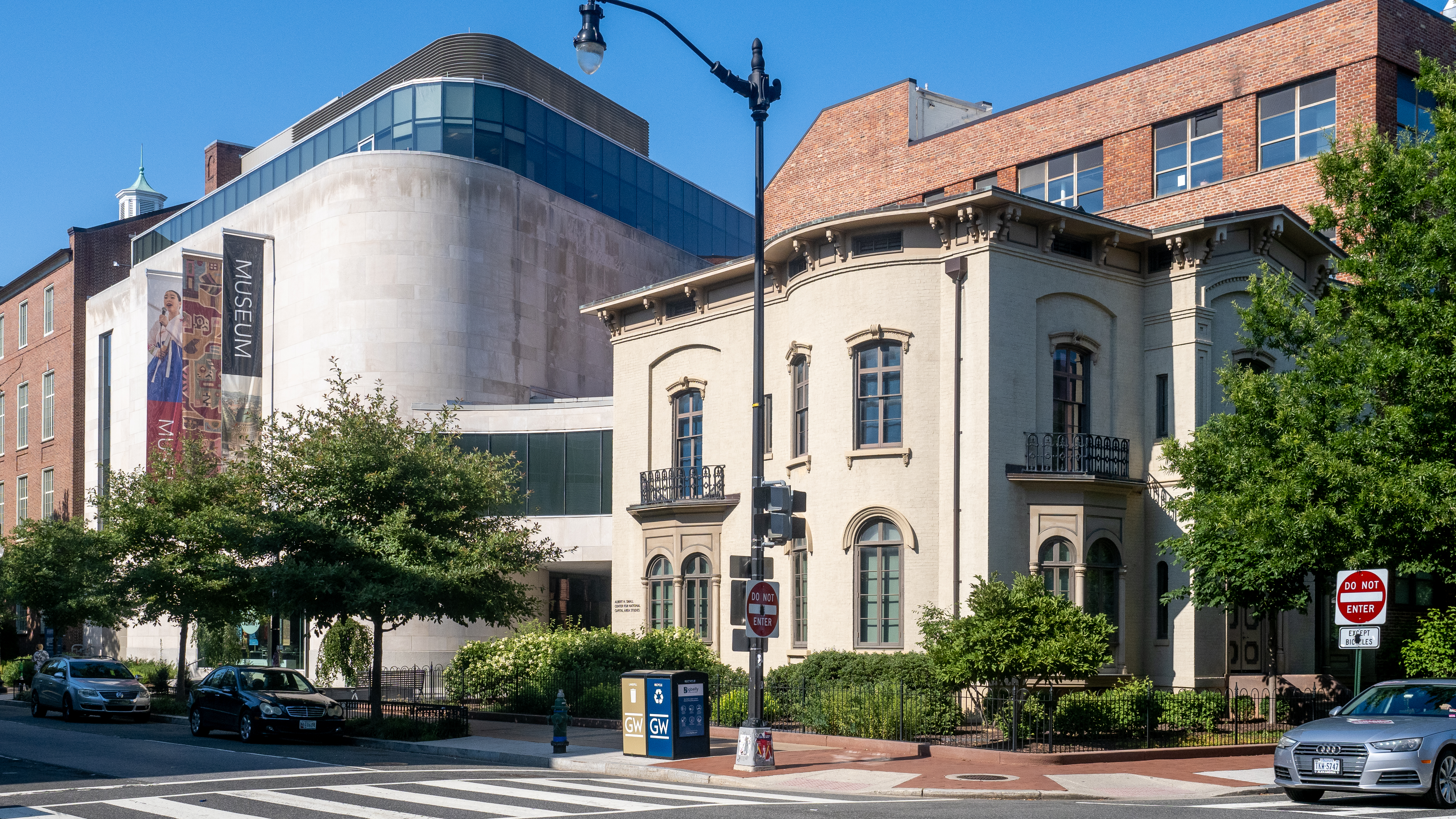
- Museum in 2024
- Former name: The Textile Museum
- Established: 1925
- Location: Washington, DC
- Type: Textile museum
- Director: John Wetenhall
- Website: museum.gwu.edu

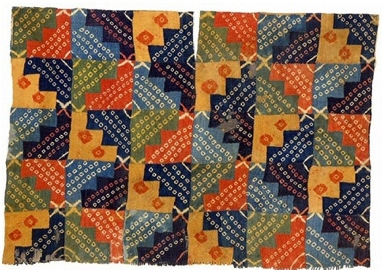
Wari tunic, Peru, 750–950 AD. Acquired by George Hewitt Myers in 1941.

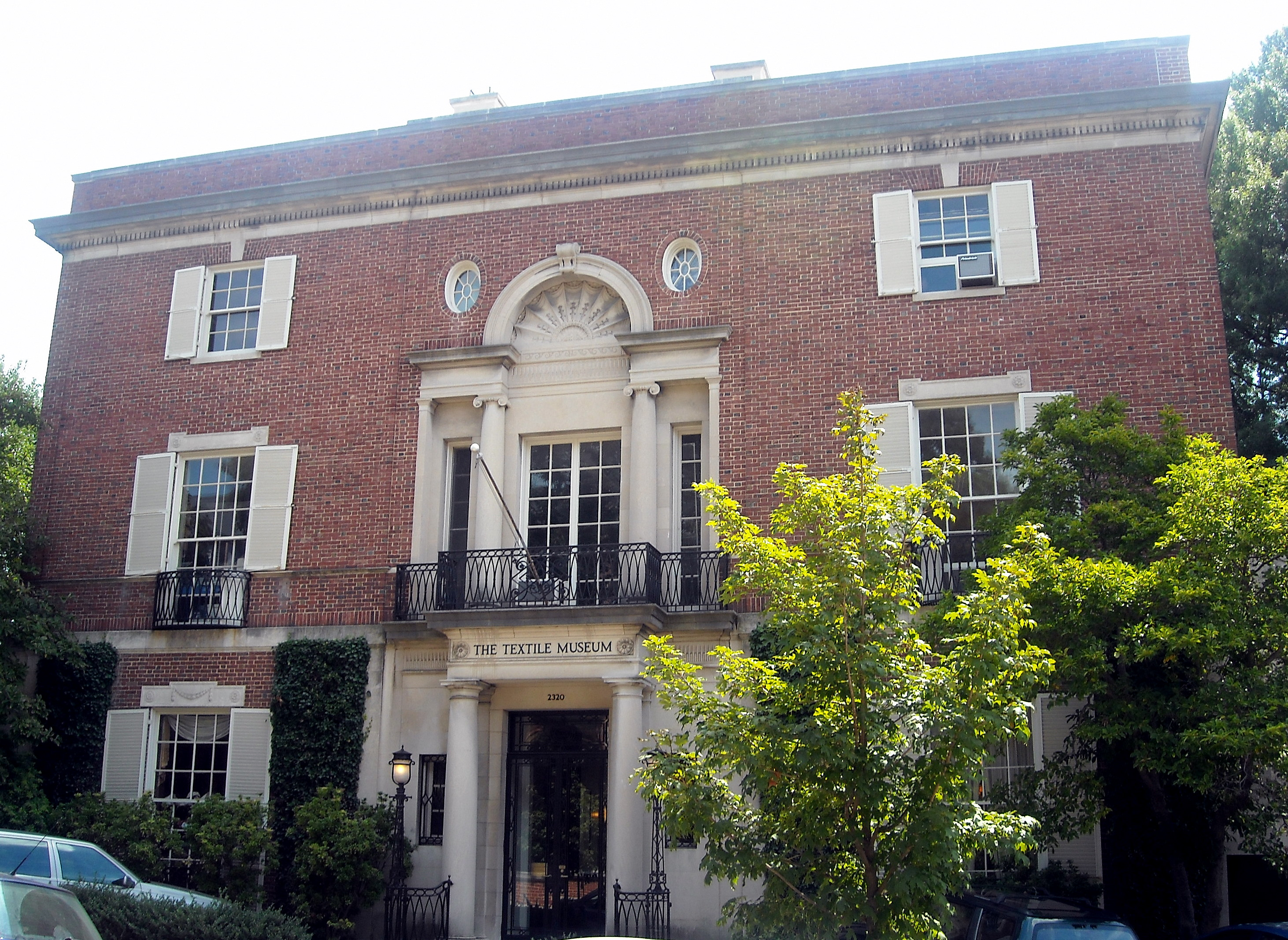
The former location of The Textile Museum, also known as the Tucker House and Myers House located at 2310-2320 S Street, NW in the Kalorama neighborhood of Washington, D.C. The buildings are listed on the National Register of Historic Places.

The George Washington University Museum and Textile Museum is a museum in Washington, D.C., dedicated to the history of George Washington University and textile arts, located in the Foggy Bottom neighborhood. The museum was founded by collector George Hewitt Myers in 1925 and was originally housed in two historic buildings in D.C.'s Kalorama neighborhood: the Myers family home, designed by John Russell Pope, and an adjacent building designed by Waddy Wood. It reopened in March 2015 as part of George Washington University.

The museum's mission is to expand public knowledge and appreciation – locally, nationally and internationally – of the artistic merits and cultural importance of the world's textiles.

== History ==
The Textile Museum was established in 1925 by George Hewitt Myers, a rug and textile collector and connoisseur — and was formerly housed in the building his family called home. At the time of its founding, the museum's collection included 275 rugs and sixty related textiles, a collection Myers had built since the 1890s. Myers, a pioneer in the appreciation of handmade textiles as art and collectable objects, was drawn to the fact that non-Western textiles were the products of anonymous artists, and therefore not judged by the name or reputation of a particular person. The first objects that Myers purchased were late-nineteenth century Turkish and Caucasian village rugs, vibrant pieces with geometric designs and strong colors. As time passed and his finances allowed, Myers began to acquire a broader range of textiles, from Ottoman carpets to archeological textiles from Peru. By the second decade of his collecting, Myers methodically set out to create a comprehensive assemblage of non-Western textiles for the purpose of increasing public knowledge and appreciation of textile traditions worldwide. His intentions came to fruition in 1925, when he transformed his family home into a public institution, and his private collection into a public one.

Designed by John Russell Pope in 1913, the Myers home was a classical Georgian structure set in the Kalorama neighborhood of Washington, D.C. The museum's galleries were housed in an adjacent building, designed by Washington architect Waddy Wood and purchased by Myers in 1915 for this purpose. Large gardens behind the buildings were open to the public during museum hours.

In its early years, The Textile Museum was overseen by three trustees and a staff of one, and was open by appointment only. In 1928, the museum received its first major news article: "Capital Man has Private Museum", a story about Myers and the Textile Museum. In 1930, Myers traveled with his wife, Louise Stoddard Chase, to Egypt to acquire items for the collection, and the following year lent objects for the first time, for a London exhibition. Myers continued to play an active role in the arts society of Washington, D.C., founding the Independent Schools Art Instructors Association in 1936 and mingling with fellow aficionados and collectors at social engagements around the city. The first director of the Textile Museum, Rene Batigne, was brought on in 1953.

By the time of Myers' death in 1957, the museum staff included eleven individuals who worked with a collection of 3,500 textiles and 480 carpets from Africa, Asia, and Latin America. Soon thereafter, in 1960, Myers' wife died and the Myers residence was bequeathed to the Textile Museum. In the next decade, the museum established its conservation lab behind the museum's buildings and launched its membership program with a base of 200 charter members. In the 1970s, The Textile Museum began offering Rug & Textile Appreciation Mornings — informal Saturday morning programs where collectors shared pieces from their own holdings; this traditional series continues to this day on a variety of topics. That same decade welcomed the opening of The Textile Museum Shop, hailed today as one of Washington, D.C.'s best museum stores, and the initiation of the museum's volunteer docents program. In 1972, The Textile Museum's Advisory Council was formed and the museum was awarded its first federal grant, given by the National Endowment for the Arts. In 1979, the museum closed temporarily for a major renovation project, including the implementation of climate control in the museum's galleries, library, offices, and storage areas.

=== Affiliation with The George Washington University ===
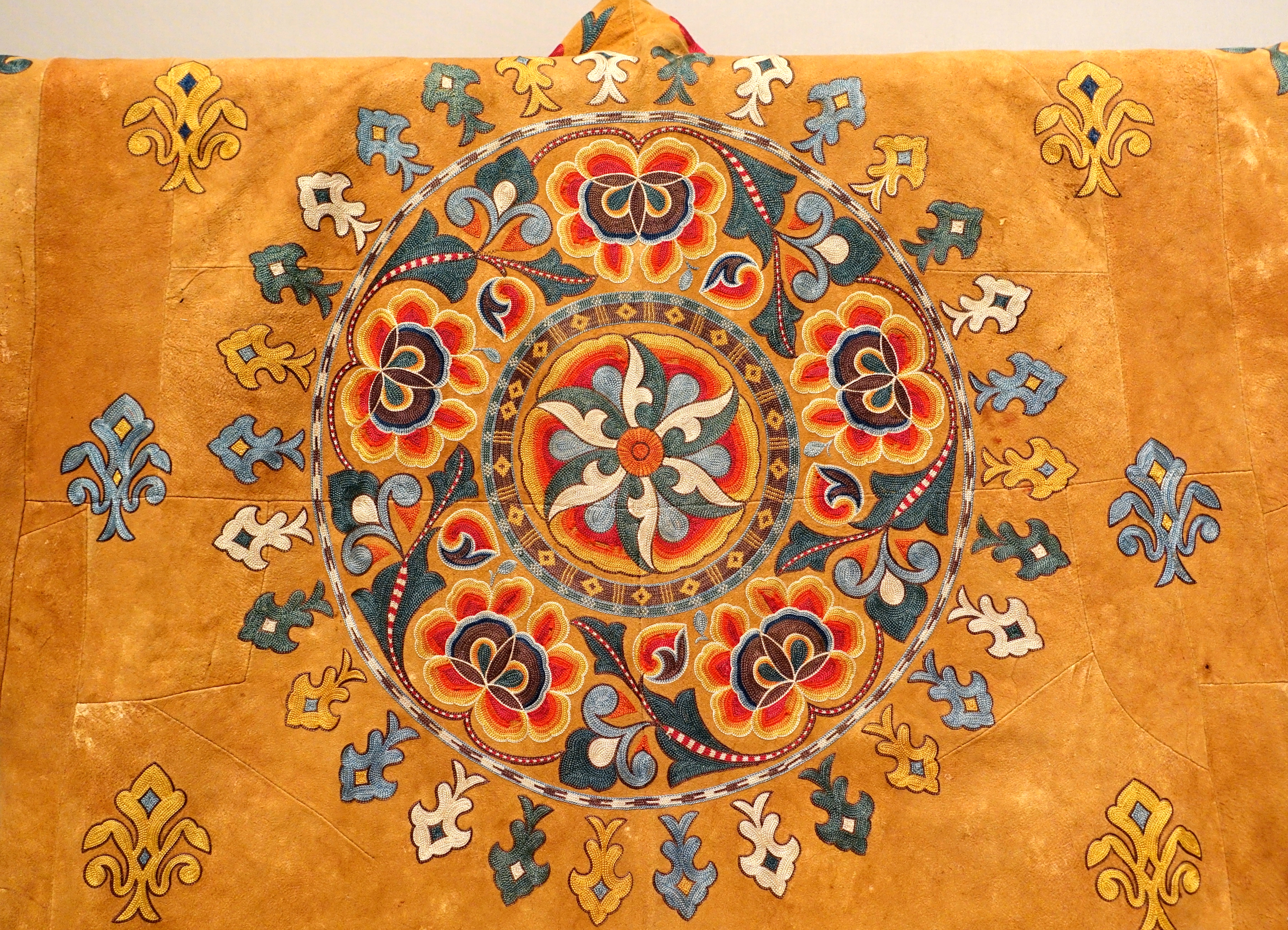
Winter coat for Kazakh man, Uzbekistan, Tashkent, 1850–1900 AD, fur, doe skin, cotton, silk. 2015 show at new location, GW campus.

In 2011, it was announced that The Textile Museum would be joining with The George Washington University to become the cornerstone of a new museum on GW's main campus in Foggy Bottom. The affiliation positioned The Textile Museum to educate the next generation and expand on its rich tradition of art, education, scholarship and cultural understanding. The new museum opened to the public on March 21, 2015.

Exhibitions and programs are presented to the public in a custom-built, approximately 53,000-square-foot museum building located at G and 21st streets NW, bearing the names of both The George Washington University Museum and The Textile Museum. The new museum includes dedicated space for The Textile Museum, the Arthur D. Jenkins Library for the Textile Arts, and the museum shop. In addition to the downtown location, GW constructed a 20,000-square-foot conservation and collections resource center on its Virginia Science and Technology Campus in Loudoun County, Va., for the study and care of The Textile Museum's and the university's collections.

In 2016, the original Textile Museum property in Kalorama was sold to Jeff Bezos for use as a private residence.

== Collection ==
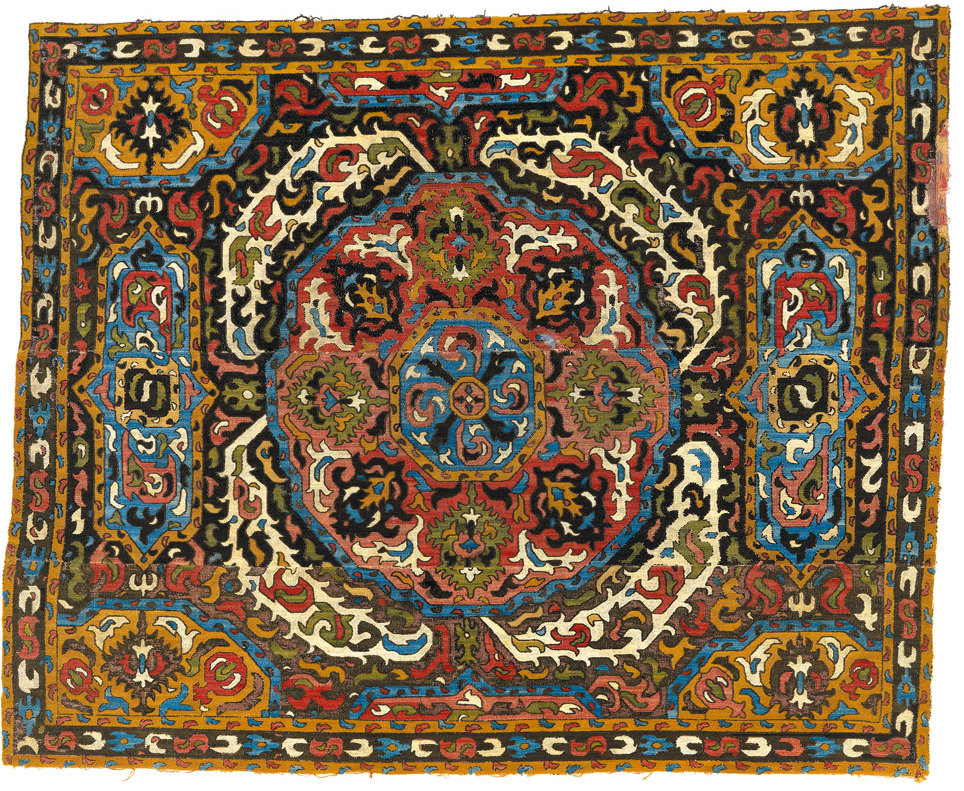
Silk embroidery, greater Azerbaijan, 17th-18th century. In the collections of the Textile Museum. To be published in a new book, Stars of the Caucasus, at the International Symposium on Azerbaijani Carpets, Baku, 2017.

In 1925 George Hewitt Myers founded The Textile Museum with a collection of 275 rugs and 60 related textiles drawn from the traditions of non-Western cultures. At the time of his death in 1957, his collection numbered 500 rugs and 3,500 textiles. Since then, the museum has broadened its holdings to better represent the full spectrum of non-Western textile arts. Today the museum's collections number more than 19,000 objects and span 5,000 years, dating from 3,000 B.C.E. to the present.

=== Oriental rugs ===
The intrinsic beauty of Oriental carpets had a profound influence on George Hewitt Myers' early collecting. As a result, the museum has one of the most important research collections of Oriental carpets, distinguished by both its range and depth. Its collection of 15th century Mamluk rugs from Egypt, Spanish carpets and classical Indian carpet fragments are matched by no other museum in the world. There is also a large collection of Anatolian and Central Asian rugs and a group of 17th century Caucasian dragon carpets and fragments that is perhaps the best collection in the world outside of Turkey.

=== Other textiles ===
Myers' initial acquisitions and later gifts and purchases now endow the museum with some of the finest collections in the world in early Islamic textiles, including tiraz, and Coptic textiles. In addition, the museum has significant holdings of Indian, Southeast Asian, Central Asian, Persian, Turkish and Greek textiles. Although smaller in number, the collection also includes textiles from China, Japan and Africa.

The museum also has holdings of pre-Columbian Peruvian textiles. Styles that are particularly well represented include Ocucaje, Nasca, Huari, Chimu, Chancay and Inca. In addition the collection includes extensive holdings of textiles in the modern traditions that descend from pre-Columbian origins, including those of Guatemala and Mexico, as well as the Andean countries of Ecuador, Peru and Bolivia. The museum also has a large collection of molas from Kuna Yala in Panama.

== Exhibitions and events ==
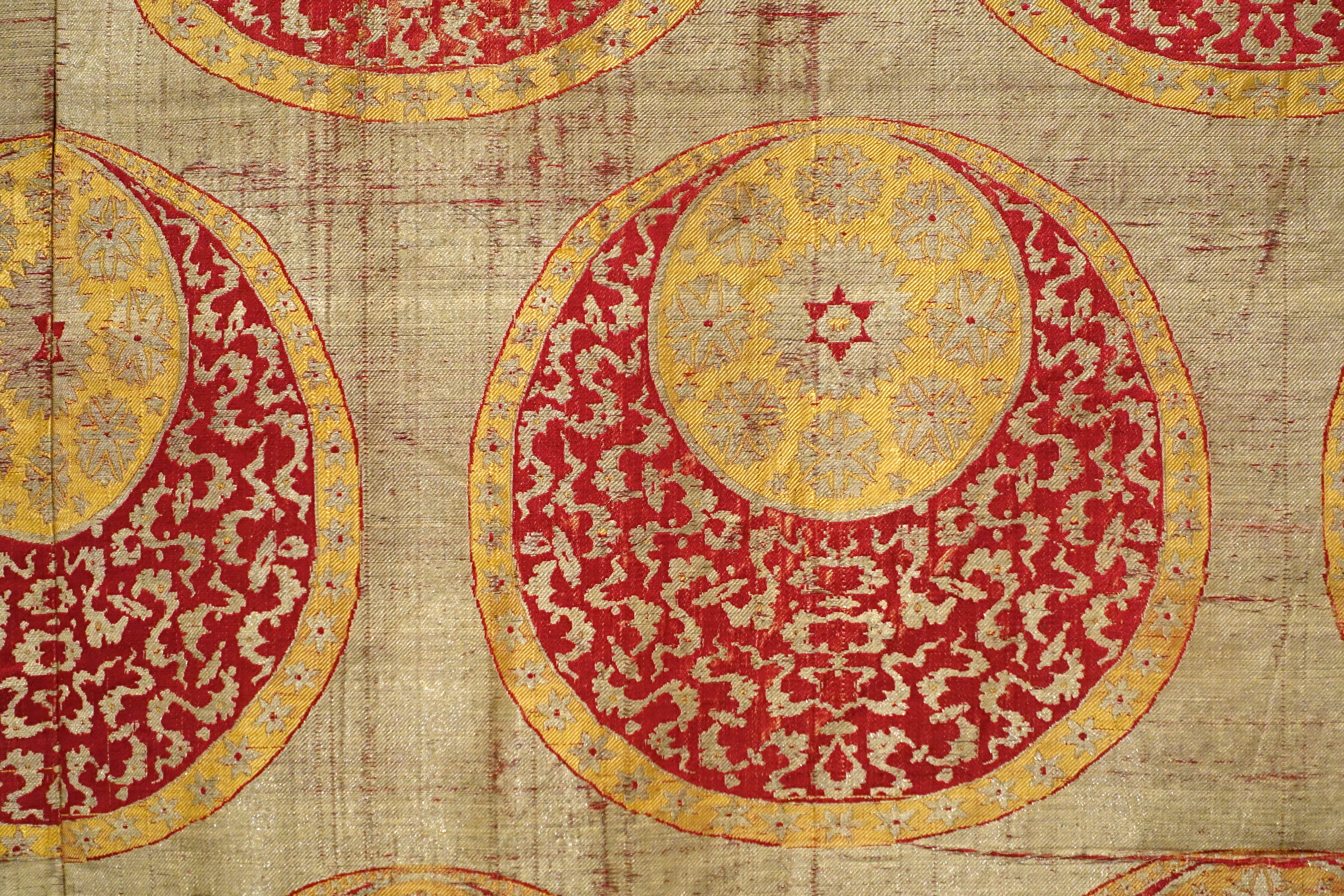
Ecclesiastical garment (probably), likely Christian Armenian, New Julfa, near Isfahan, mid 1600s AD, Ottoman Turkish and Safavid silk fabrics. 2015 exhibit at the old Textile Museum.

Exhibitions are designed both to present textiles as art and to place them in a cultural context, by exploring religious, social, artistic, economic and ecological aspects of the cultures in which they were created. A wide range of public programs for audiences of all ages and levels of experience, including gallery tours, lectures, family programs, The Textile Museum Fall Symposium, and others, complement the exhibitions.

In 2010, The Textile Museum collaborated with The Pink Line Project to produce Hapi Hapi Hour, a closing party for its exhibition of avant-garde clothing, "Contemporary Japanese Fashion: The Mary Baskett Collection." To create an event that was as edgy as the exhibition, the museum lit up its secluded garden with lanterns; brought in a band, a DJ and a sushi and sake bar; and hosted tours of the exhibit.

In 2011, The Textile Museum collaborated with The Pink Line Project to create PM at the TM in June to ring in the summer exhibition, Green: The Color and The Cause. Additionally, The Textile Museum and The Pink Line Project worked together to throw the second iteration of Cuisine Contra.
