= Ashford Lake =

Pond in Connecticut, United States

- Location within Connecticut
- Location: Ashford, Connecticut, United States of America
- Coordinates: 41.90036°N 72.12825°W
- Type: Artificial
- Primary inflows: Intermittent streams, runoff, springs
- Primary outflows: Goss Brook
- Basin countries: United States of America (Connecticut)
- Managing agency: Ashford Lake POA
- First flooded: 1949
- Max. length: 0.59 mi (0.95 km) approx.
- Max. width: 0.19 mi (0.31 km) approx.
- Surface area: 52.6 acres (21.3 ha)
- Max. depth: 12 ft (3.7 m)
- Surface elevation: 659 ft (201 m)
- Frozen: December through March (most winters)
- Islands: 0

Ashford Lake is a small, shallow, privately owned pond located in the eastern part of the town of Ashford in northeastern Connecticut, along the town's border with Eastford. The pond has an area of 52.6 acres and a maximum depth of approximately 12 feet. Its normal surface elevation is 659 feet above sea level.

== History ==
Ashford Lake was created in 1949 when an earthen dam was constructed on Goss Brook.

On July 17, 2018, an EF0 tornado -- the first tornado to touch down in Windham County since 1992 -- struck Ashford Lake and the surrounding neighborhoods, downing trees, damaging homes, and killing three household rabbits.

== Description ==
Ashford Lake's inflows consist of intermittent small streams and runoff, along with springs at the bottom of the pond. The pond's waters are held back by an earthen embankment dam on its south shore. Ashford Lake's outlet is Goss Brook, which flows over the dam's spillway and eventually into the Mount Hope River.

== Recreation ==
Ashford Lake is only accessible to homeowners and their guests. The pond is home to private beaches which can be used by residents. Ashford Lake has no boat launch, but residents may use their own boats as long as electric motors are used. NO GAS

== Flora and fauna ==
Ashford Lake is home to abundant aquatic vegetation, but most of it cannot be seen from the surface, and thus it poses little negative impacts on recreation. The pond has no invasive plant species. Patches of Sparganium sp. are common along the shore, while Eleocharis acicularis, Isoetes sp., Nuphar variegata and Brasenia schreberi are sparse. A progression of plant species occur with increasing depth. Najas flexilis dominates areas from one to six feet deep, Utricularia radiata occurs in six to nine feet of water and Potamogeton foliosus is present in water from nine to twelve feet.

Fish are occasionally spotted in Ashford Lake's waters, such as largemouth bass.
