= Francis Bugbee =

American politician

Francis Bugbee (February 18, 1794 – April 21, 1877) was an American lawyer, judge, and politician.

Bugbee was born in Ashford, Connecticut, February 18, 1794, the son of Amos and Martha (Woodward) Bugbee. He graduated from Yale College in 1818. After graduation, he took charge of an academy in North Carolina, at the same time studying law with Judge Badger. In June 1820, he was admitted to the bar in that State, and in the October following to the bar of Pennsylvania at Harrisburg.

In January 1821, he settled in Elyton, Alabama, where he remained until 1826, at which time he removed to Montgomery, in the same state, where he resided until his death. Besides pursuing the regular duties of his profession, he was a warm friend of education, and served from 1836 to 1871 as a trustee of the University of Alabama.

In 1843 he was a member of the Alabama State Legislature. During the American Civil War he was an avowed Union man, and at its close was appointed a judge of the circuit court. From 1866 to 1869 he served as United States Attorney. He died suddenly at his residence in Montgomery, April 21, 1877, of apoplexy, in his 84th year.

Judge Bugbee was married, in Jefferson County, Alabama, July 5, 1827, to Lavinia H. Tarrant, with whom he had five children. His only son, a graduate of the University of Alabama, and a lawyer of high promise, died in 1859.
