= Lake Chaffee =

Lake in Connecticut, United States

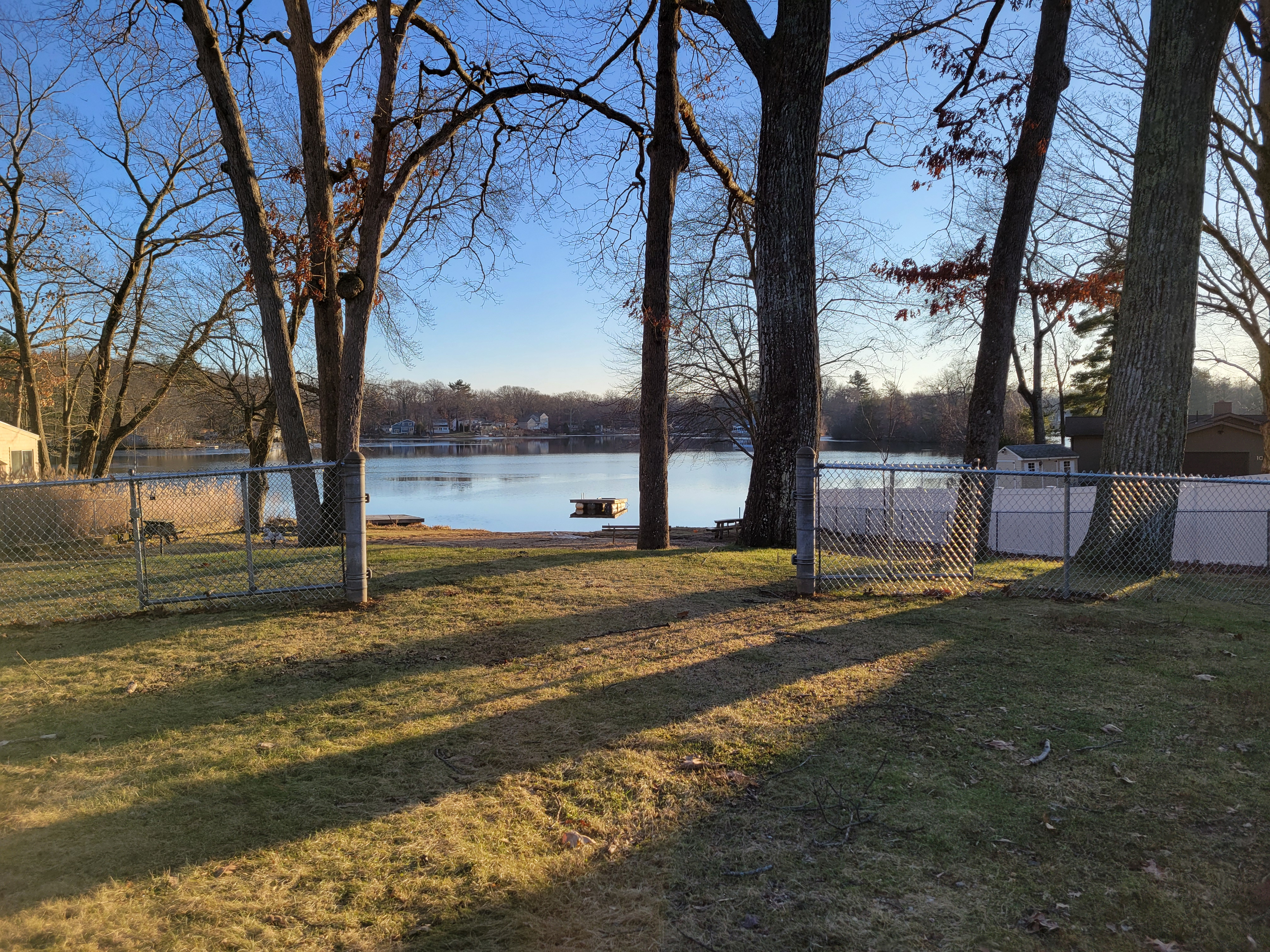
- Lake Chaffee

- Location within Connecticut
- Location: Ashford, Connecticut, United States of America
- Coordinates: 41.93887°N 72.19442°W
- Type: Artificial
- Primary inflows: Intermittent streams, runoff
- Primary outflows: Chaffee Brook
- Catchment area: 284 acres (115 ha)
- Basin countries: United States of America (Connecticut)
- Managing agency: Lake Chaffee Improvement Association
- Surface area: 54 acres (22 ha)
- Average depth: 6 ft (1.8 m)
- Max. depth: 11 ft (3.4 m)
- Residence time: Nearly six months
- Shore length^{1}: 8,400 ft (2,600 m) (excluding islands)
- Surface elevation: 856 ft (261 m)
- Frozen: December through March (most winters)
- Islands: 2
- ^{1} Shore length is not a well-defined measure.

Lake Chaffee is a small, shallow, man-made lake located approximately 2 miles (3.2 km) northwest of the hamlet of Westford in the town of Ashford in Windham County, northeastern Connecticut. The lake has an area of 54 acres (22 ha) and a maximum depth of 11 feet (3.4 m). Its average surface elevation is 856 feet (261 m) above sea level.

== History ==
Lake Chaffee was formed sometime prior to 1934 by damming a small stream named Chaffee Brook. Before the dam was built, wetlands existed where the pond is now.

== Description ==
Lake Chaffee's inflows consist of several intermittent small streams and runoff, and its outlet is Chaffee Brook, which flows east to the Mount Hope River. The lake's waters are held back by a 300-foot-long (91 m) earthen dam; Chaffee Brook exits the lake via a 10-foot-long (3.0 m) concrete spillway in the middle of this dam. Lake Chaffee's watershed is approximately 284 acres (115 ha) in area. It takes nearly six months for the lake's water to be completely exchanged. The lake has approximately 8,400 feet (2,600 m) of shoreline, disregarding the lake's two islands.

== Development ==
Today, Lake Chaffee is surrounded by a high-density area of houses which overlook the water. The houses are part of the Lake Chaffee census-designated place for statistical purposes.

== Recreation ==
Lake Chaffee is home to two beaches and a boat launch, which are open to lake residents. Swimming, fishing, canoeing, kayaking and skating are popular activities on the lake. Use of gasoline-powered engines is not permitted on, over, or above Lake Chaffee.

== Flora and fauna ==
Lake Chaffee is an excellent fishery, with a healthy population of largemouth bass, black crappie, chain pickerel, and yellow perch. The largemouth bass average in the two-pound class, with larger fish in the four- to six-pound class being common.

Lake Chaffee is home to abundant aquatic vegetation, which occasionally must be harvested to enable recreational activities.
