= Ingrid Burke =

American ecology researcher

Indy Burke
- Education: Middlebury College (B.S. in Biology), University of Wyoming (PhD in Botany)
- Spouse: William Lauenroth
- Children: 2
- Scientific career
- Fields: Ecosystem Ecology, Biogeochemistry

Ingrid C. "Indy" Burke is the Carl W. Knobloch Dean of the Yale School of the Environment. She is the first female dean in the school's 125-year history. Her area of research is ecosystem ecology with a primary focus on carbon cycling and nitrogen cycling in semi-arid rangeland ecosystems. She teaches on subjects relating to ecosystem ecology and biogeochemistry.

== Early life and education ==
Burke grew up in Richmond, Virginia, where her mother, Louise Burke, was a committed conservationist, who, as the first woman to chair the Richmond City Planning Commission, co-led the effort to create James River Park. Burke earned a bachelor's degree in biology from Middlebury College and a doctorate in botany from the University of Wyoming. At Middlebury, Burke had planned to major in English, but after taking a science class in which they examined the role of photosynthesis in aquatic environments she became fascinated by the topic of environmental science. She soon decided to switch her major to biology after realizing that she could spend her life working outside and conducting scientific investigations as a profession. After graduating from Middlebury, she started a PhD track at Dartmouth College. There, she had planned to study a phenomenon known as “fir waves,” in which rows of balsam fir trees die collectively, forming arresting patterns across the landscape, but when her advisor accepted a position at the University of Wyoming, Burke decided to move, too.

== Career and research ==
Burke's career as an environmental scientist and educator began in the Natural Resource Ecology Laboratory at Colorado State University, where she was hired as a Postdoctoral Fellow in 1987. She was then appointed assistant professor and later associate professor and full professor in the Department of Forest Sciences at Colorado State University. In 2008, she joined the faculty at the University of Wyoming, where she served as director and then dean of the Haub School of Environment and Natural Resources. In 2016, she became the Carl W. Knobloch, Jr. Dean of the Yale School of Forestry & Environmental Studies, which was renamed the Yale School of the Environment in 2020.

She has published over 170 peer-reviewed articles, chapter, books, and reports, including the investigation of a significant project titled, "A Regional Assessment of Land Use Effects on Ecosystem Structure and Function in the Central Grasslands" from 1996-1999. This project had major implications for understanding and managing ecosystems in the central United States.

Burke serves on the board of directors at The Conservation Fund and on the governing council of The Wilderness Society. She is also on the board of trustees of The Nature Conservancy's Wyoming Chapter.

=== Selected publications ===
- The Importance of Land-Use Legacies to Ecology and Conservation (2003) BioScience, Vol 53, Issue 1, 77–88
- Texture, Climate, and Cultivation Effects on Soil Organic Matter Content in U.S. Grassland Soils (1989) Soil Science Society of America Journal, Vol. 53 No. 3, 800-805
- Global-Scale Similarities in Nitrogen Release Patterns During Long-Term Decomposition (2007) Science, Vol. 315, Issue 5810, 361-364
- Plant-Soil Interactions in Temperate Grasslands (1998) "Biogeochemistry," Vol. 42, No. 1/2, pp. 121-143
- Regional and Temporal Variation in Net Primary Production and Nitrogen Mineralization in Grasslands (1997) "Ecology," Vol. 78, no. 5: 1330–40 https://doi.org/10.2307/2266128.
- ANPP Estimates From NDVI for the Central Grasslands Region of The United States (1997) Ecology, Vol. 78, No 3, 953-958
- Interactions Between Individual Plant Species and Soil Nutrient Status in Shortgrass Steppe (1995) Ecology, Vol. 76, No 4, 45-52

Additional publications can be found on her Google Scholar profile.

Her awards and honors include:

- 2019 Fellow, Ecological Society of America, for advancing our understanding of ecosystem processes, in particular nitrogen and carbon cycling in grasslands.
- 2018 Fellow, Connecticut Academy of Science and Engineering
- 2012 Promoting Intellectual Engagement Award, University of Wyoming
- 2010 Fellow, American Association for the Advancement of Science
- 2008 USDA Agricultural Research Service, Rangeland Resources Unit: Award for Enhancing Collaborative Research Partnerships
- 2005 Colorado State University Honors Professor
- 2004–2005 National Academy of Sciences Education Fellow in the Life Science
- 2001-2008 University Distinguished Teaching Scholar, Colorado State University
- 2000 Mortar Board Rose Award, Colorado State University
- 1993–‘98 National Science Foundation Presidential Faculty Fellow Award
