= Master of Environmental Management =

The Master of Environmental Management (MEM) is a degree designed for students with primary interests in careers in environmental policy and analysis, stewardship, education, consulting, or management dealing with natural resource or environmental issues. The program requires course work in both the natural and social sciences, with a particular focus on the relationship among science, management, and policy. The ultimate purpose of the degree program is to prepare students to address ecological and social systems with scientific understanding and an ability to make sense of the complex underlying social and ecological context.

The value of an interdisciplinary environmental degree is best espoused by Aldo Leopold, who obtained a Master of Forestry degree.

"One of the requisites for an ecological comprehension of land is an understanding of ecology, and this is by no means co-extensive with 'education'; in fact, much higher education seems deliberately to avoid ecological concepts. An understanding of ecology does not necessarily originate in courses bearing ecological labels; it is quite as likely to be labeled geography, botany, agronomy, history, or economics. This is as it should be...".

The "Big Four" Master of Environmental Management programs are:

- UC Santa Barbara Bren School of Environmental Science and Management
- Nicholas School of the Environment, Duke University
- School for Environment and Sustainability, University of Michigan
- Yale School of the Environment

Other programs include:

- Portland State University - College of Liberal Arts & Sciences
- University of San Francisco - Master of Science in Environmental Management
- Western Colorado University - Master in Environmental Management
- University of Connecticut - Master of Energy and Environmental Management – Online

Many of these schools also offer joint degrees, where the MEM is paired with an MBA, MPP, JD, or M.Div.
