= Yale School of the Environment =

Professional school at Yale University in forestry and environmental sciences

- Coat of arms of the school
- Established: 1900
- Parent institution: Yale University
- Dean: Ingrid Burke
- Academic staff: 47
- Postgraduates: 280
- Doctoral students: 75
- Location: New Haven, Connecticut, United States; 41°19′01″N 72°55′25″W
- Website: environment.yale.edu

The Yale School of the Environment (YSE) is a graduate school within Yale University. Originally founded as the Yale Forest School (1900), it was renamed as the Yale School of Forestry & Environmental Studies in 1972, and again in July 2020 as the "Yale School of the Environment." The two professional Master Degree programs are Master of Environmental Management (MEM) and Master of Forestry (MF), while the two research-based programs are Master of Environmental Science (MESc) and Master of Forest Science (MFS). There is also 5-year PhD program. Originally founded to train foresters (and still offering forestry instruction), it has the oldest graduate forestry program in the United States.

== History and overview ==
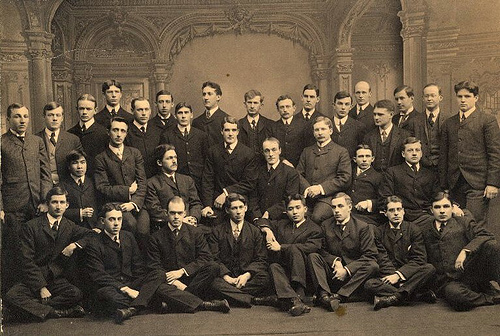
Yale School of Forestry, Class of 1904

The school was founded in 1900 as the Yale Forest School, to provide high-level forestry training suited to American conditions. At the urging of Yale alumnus Gifford Pinchot, his parents endowed the two-year postgraduate program. At the time Pinchot was serving as Bernhard Fernow's successor as Chief of the Division of Forestry (predecessor of the U.S. Forest Service, USFS). Pinchot released two foresters from the division to start the school: fellow Yale graduate Henry Solon Graves and James Toumey. Graves became the School's first dean and Toumey its second.

When the school opened, other places in the United States offered forestry training, but none had a post-graduate program. (Both Pinchot and Graves had gone to Europe to study forestry after graduating from Yale.) In the fall of 1900, the New York State College of Forestry at Cornell had 24 students, Biltmore Forest School 9, and Yale 7. Despite its small size, from its beginnings the school influenced American forestry. The first two chiefs of the USFS were Pinchot and Graves; the next three were graduates from the school's first decade. Wilderness and land conservation advocate Aldo Leopold graduated in the class of 1909.

In 1915, Yale School of Forestry's second dean, James Toumey, became one of the "charter members", along with William L. Bray of the New York State College of Forestry, by then reestablished at Syracuse University, and Raphael Zon, of the Ecological Society of America. In 1950, the "activist wing" of that society formed The Nature Conservancy.

Besides the school's forests, Yale has used several other sites in the eastern United States for field education. From 1904 to 1926, the summer session leading to a master's degree in forestry was held at Grey Towers and Forester's Hall in Milford, Pennsylvania. Beginning in 1912, Yale classes took occasional field trips to the land of the Crossett Lumber Company in Arkansas. For two decades from 1946 until 1966, the company provided the school a "camp," including cabins and a mess hall, used during spring coursework on forest management and wood products production. Yale students have also used a field camp at the Great Mountain Forest in northwestern Connecticut since 1941.

Reflective of the expanding variety of environmental interests, the school changed its name to the Yale School of Forestry & Environmental Studies in 1972. YSE hosts the bi-annual Yale Environmental Sustainability Summit. The school's 16th and present dean is Ingrid "Indy" Burke, who replaced Sir Peter Crane in October, 2016. The school changed its name to Yale School of the Environment in July 2020 and, within the school, created a distinct Forest School with dedicated faculty and degrees. It also teaches the Yale College undergraduate courses needed for the Environmental Studies major.

In 2026, a comprehensive history of the school entitled The Yale School of the Environment: The First 125 Years was published by James G. Lewis, Char Miller, Mark S. Ashton, and Rachel D. Kline.

=== School buildings ===
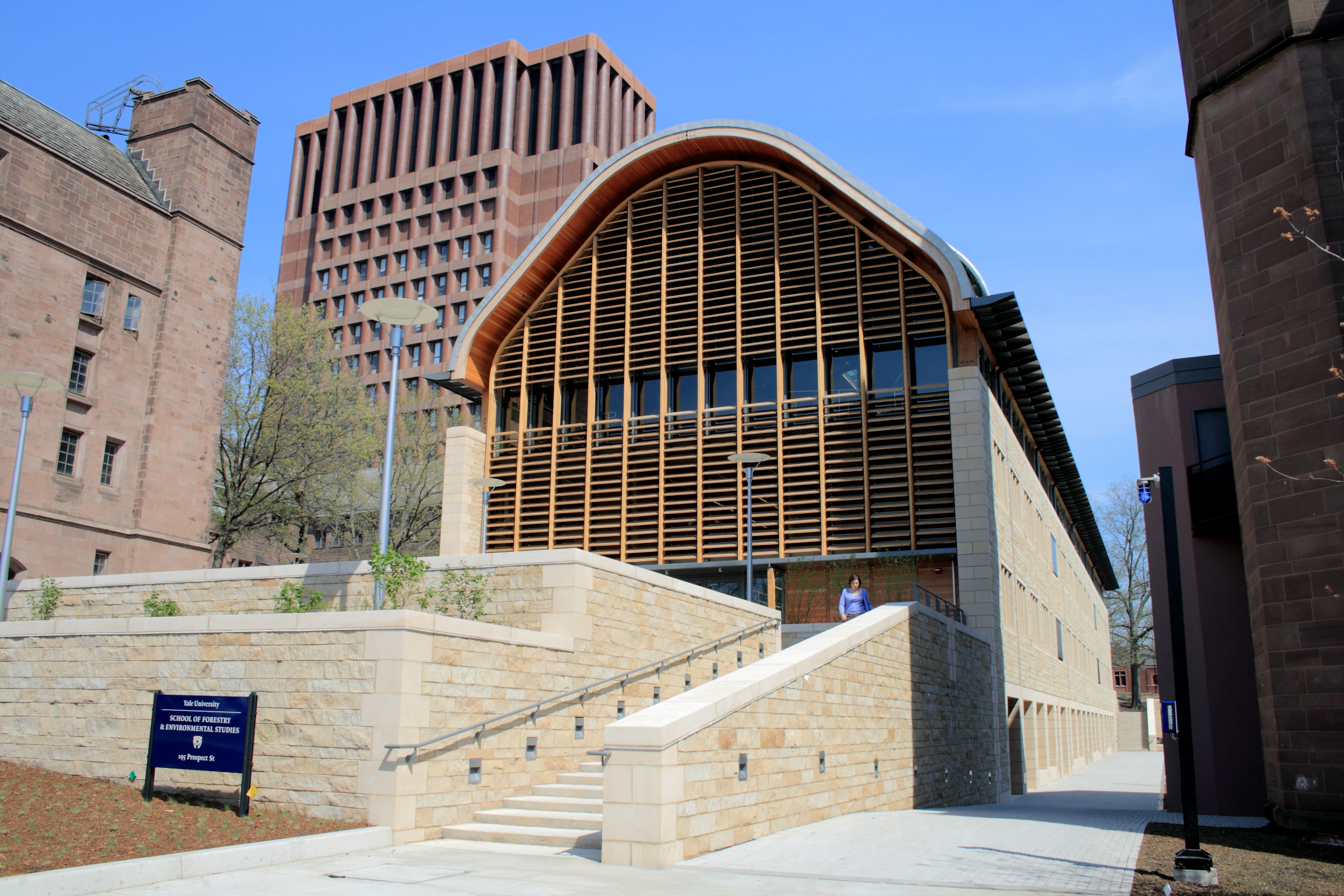
Kroon Hall, as seen from Prospect Street

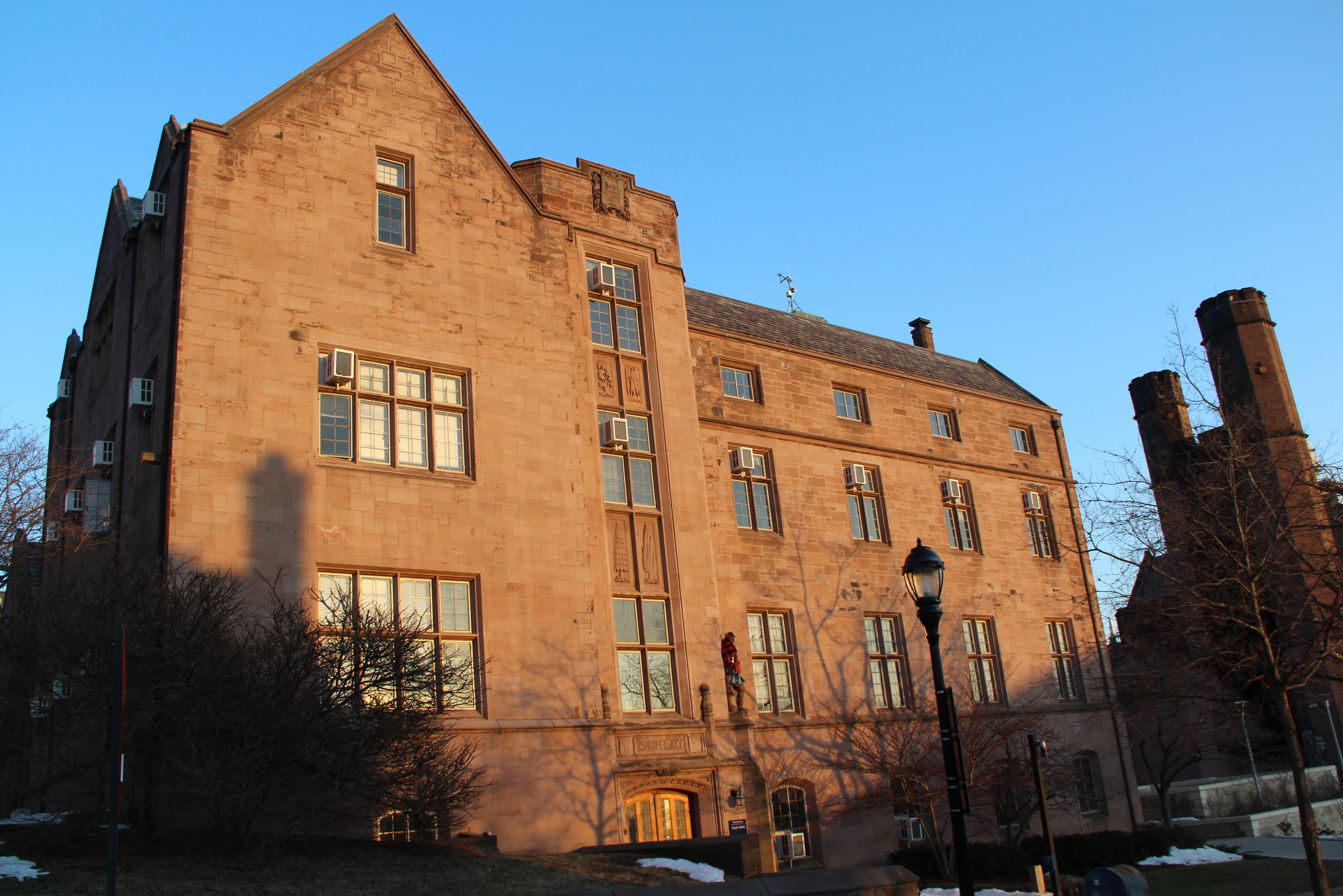
Sage Hall, completed in 1924

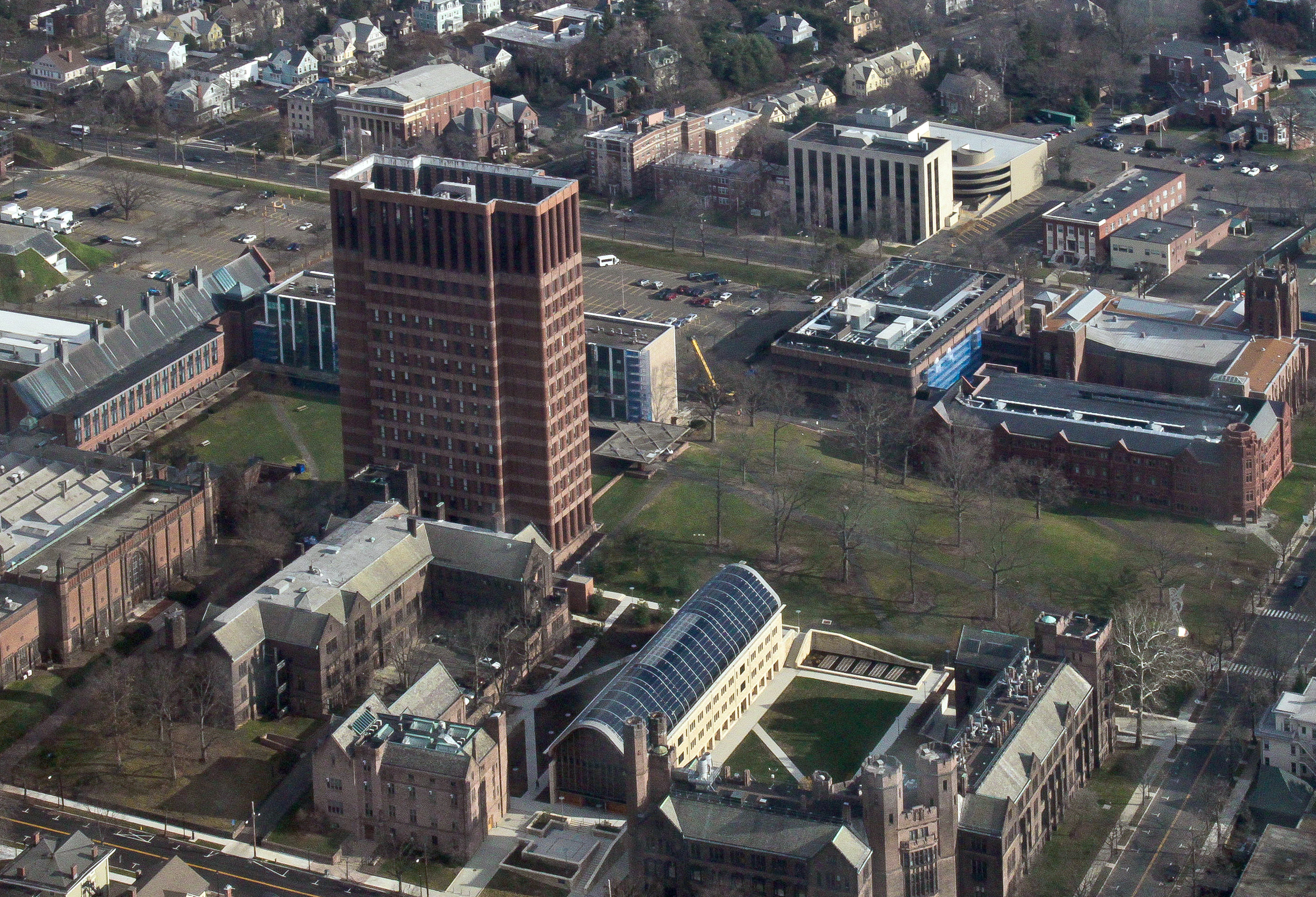
The school's main buildings, bottom center, on Science Hill

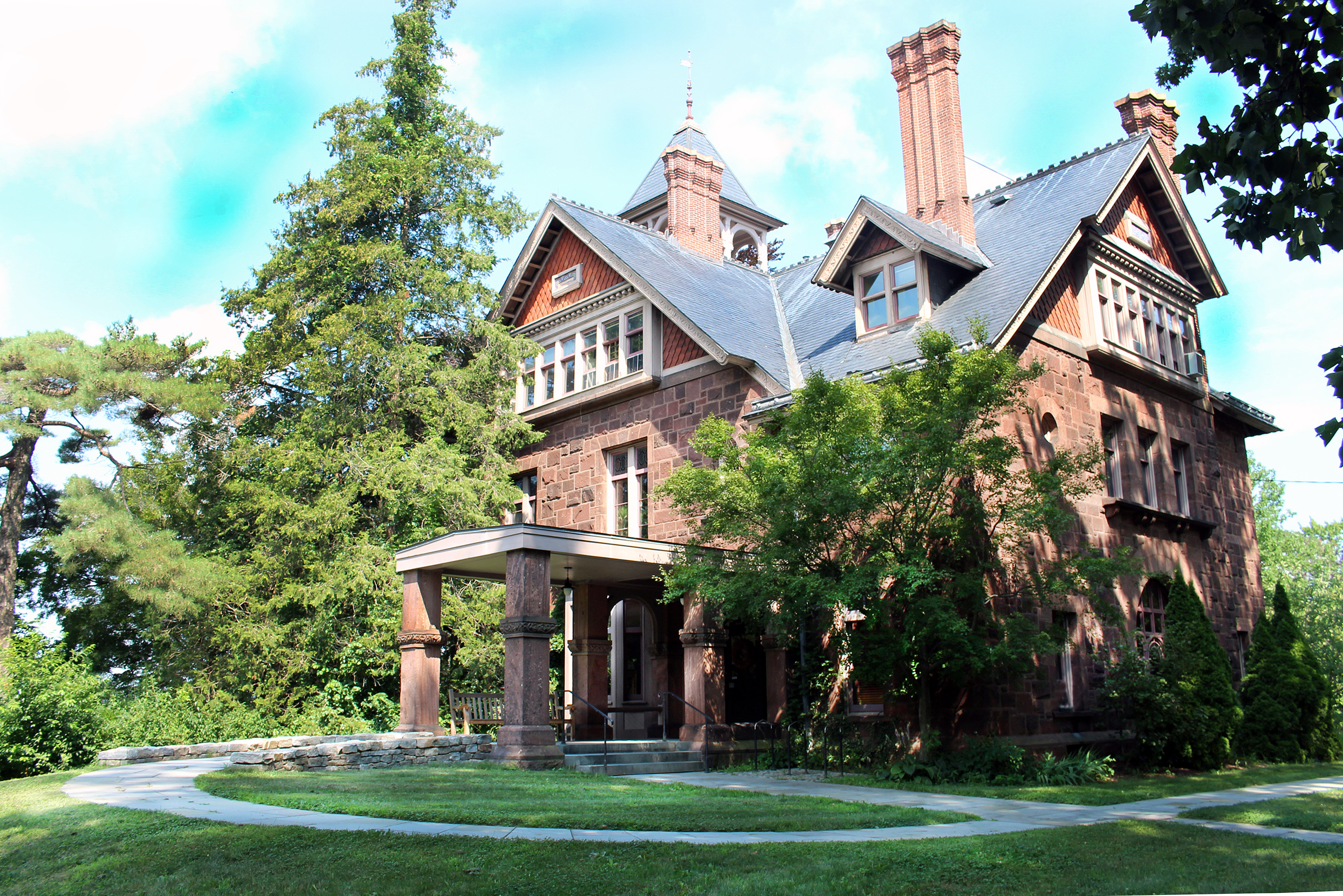
Marsh Hall, the original building of the Yale Forest School, as seen from Prospect Street

The school offers classes at Kroon Hall, Sage Hall, Greeley Labs, Marsh Hall, the Environmental Science Center, and the houses at 301 Prospect St. and 380 Edwards St. Kroon Hall, the school's main building, is named for the philanthropist Richard Kroon (Yale Class of 1964). The building has 50,000 square feet (5,000 m^{2}) of space. It is "a showcase of the latest developments in green building technology, a healthy and supportive environment for work and study, and a beautiful building that actively connects students, faculty, staff, and visitors with the natural world." The building obtained Platinum Rating under the LEED certification system. It is designed by Hopkins Architects of London with Architect of Record Centerbrook Architects & Planners. Goodfellow Inc. from Delson, Quebec, supplied the glulam roof structure.

=== School forest ===
The school owns and manages 10,880 acres (44 km^{2}) of forestland in Connecticut, New Hampshire, and Vermont. The Yale Myers Forest, in Union, Connecticut, donated to Yale in 1930 by alumnus George Hewitt Myers, is managed by the school as a multiple-use working forest. Yale-Toumey Forest, near Keene, New Hampshire, was set up by James W. Toumey (a former dean of the school) in 1913. Other Yale forestlands include Goss Woods, Crowell Forest, Cross Woods, Bowen Forest, and Crowell Ravine. A three-alarm fire burned several buildings within the Yale Myers Forest Camp on May 28, 2016. The damaged camp buildings and a new research center were rebuilt in 2017.

=== Joint programs ===
Yale School of the Environment offers 17 joint degrees, three of which are external programs with Elisabeth Haub School of Law at Pace University, Vermont Law School, and Tsinghua University, Beijing, China.

=== Rankings ===
In 2026, U.S. News & World Report ranked Yale as #4 in the United States for "Best Universities for Environment/Ecology" (#13 globally), with #1 as UC Berkeley, #2 as Stanford University, and #3 as Harvard University.

== Student life ==
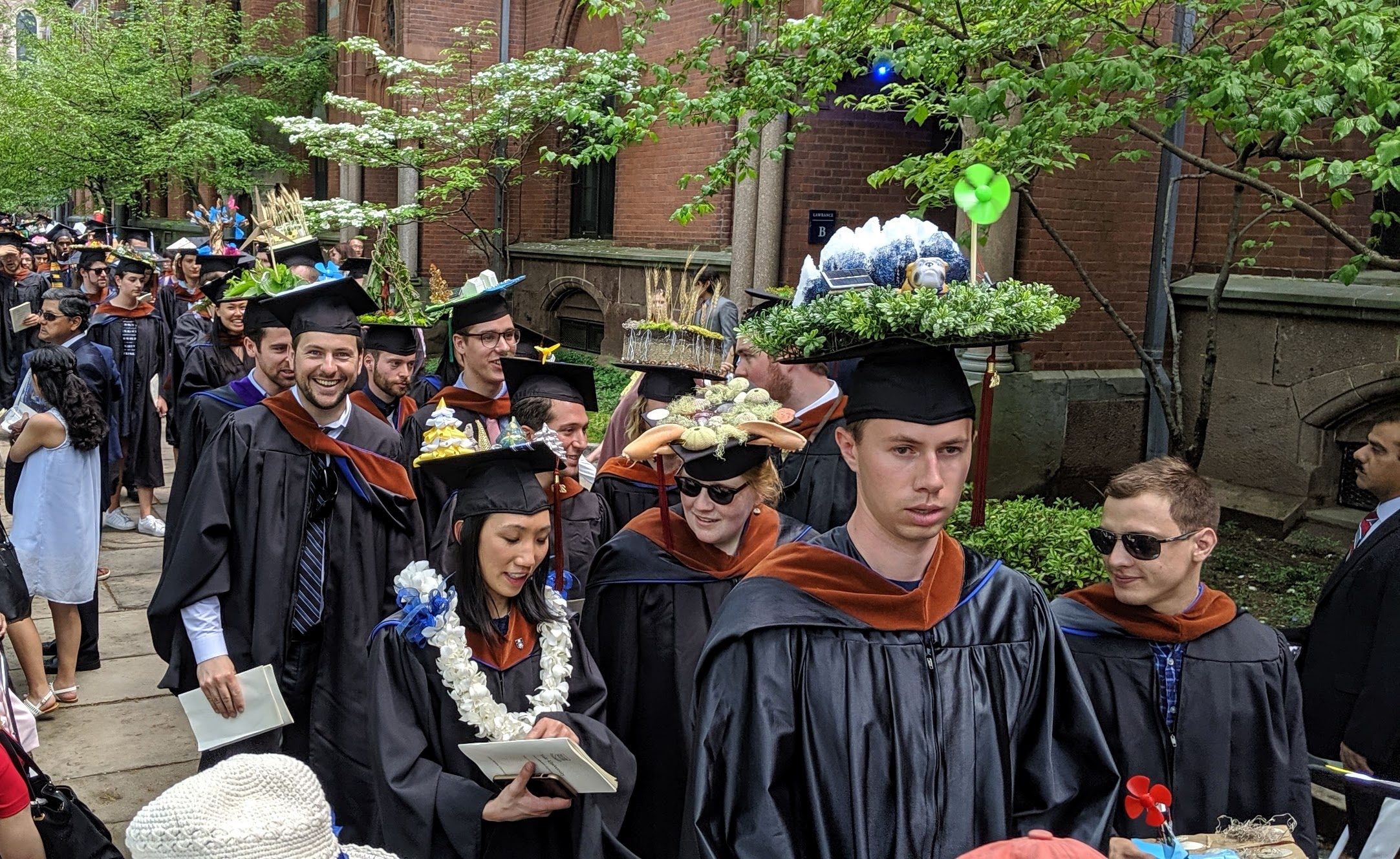
YSE graduates with decorated caps, 2019

The school has an active tradition of student involvement in academic and extracurricular life. Many students participate in student interest groups, which organize events around environmental issues of interest to them. These groups range in interest from Conservation Finance and International Development, to the Built Environment and "Fresh & Salty: The Society for Marine and Coastal Systems.”There are also social and recreational groups, such as the Forestry Club, which every Friday organizes themed "TGIF" ("Thank-God-I'm-a-Forester") happy hours and school parties; the Polar Bear Club, which swims monthly in Long Island Sound under the full moon (year-round); Veggie Dinner, which is a weekly vegetarian dinner club; the Loggerrhythms, an a cappella singing group; and the student-run BYO Café in Kroon Hall opened in 2010. A notable YSE tradition is the extravagant environmentally inspired decoration of graduation caps in preparation for commencement.

== Notable graduates ==
- Matthew Auer 1996 PhD, Dean and Arch Professor, University of Georgia School of Public and International Affairs
- Linda Behnken, commercial fisher
- Frances Beinecke 1971 BA, 1974 MFS, President, Natural Resources Defense Council; member, National Commission on the BP Deepwater Horizon Oil Spill and Offshore Drilling (2010)
- Richard M. Brett, conservationist
- Agustín F. Carbó Lugo 2012 MEM, U.S. Department of Energy Inaugural Director of Puerto Rico Grid Modernization and Recovery Team (2022-2025); First Chairman of Puerto Rico Energy Commission (2014-2017)
- Ian Cheney 2002 BA, 2003 MEM, Emmy-nominated filmmaker
- William Wallace Covington 1976 PhD, Regents' Professor, Northern Arizona University
- Justin Elicker 2010 MEM, mayor of New Haven, Connecticut
- Richard Thornton Fisher 1903 MF, founding director of the Harvard Forest
- Alphonse "Buddy" Fletcher Jr. 2004 MEM
- Emanuel Fritz, a professor known as "Mr. Redwood"
- Carmen R. Guerrero Pérez 2010 MEM, director of the Caribbean Environmental Protection Division of the Environmental Protection Agency
- William B. Greeley, Chief, U.S. Forest Service, 1920–1928
- Christopher T. Hanson 1996 M.E.M./M.A.R. Chairman, Nuclear Regulatory Commission, 2021–2025
- Stuart L. Hart 1976 MFS, academic addressing global poverty and economic development, professor emeritus at Cornell University
- Phillip Hoose 1977 MFS, author
- Ralph Hosmer, pioneering Hawaiian forester
- Edward M. Kennedy Jr. 1991 MES, attorney and Connecticut state senator
- Aldo Leopold 1908, conservationist and author of A Sand County Almanac
- H. R. MacMillan, forester and industrialist
- John R. McGuire, Chief, U.S. Forest Service, 1972–1979
- Thornton T. Munger, pioneering U.S. Forest Service researcher; civic activist who helped create Portland, Oregon's Forest Park
- Mark Plotkin 1981 MFS, ethnobotanist, explorer, and activist
- Robert Michael Pyle 1976 PhD, lepidopterist and John-Burroughs-Medal–winning author, subject of The Dark Divide
- Samuel J. Record, botanist
- Arthur Cuming Ringland 1905, District Forester, Southwestern Region, U.S. Forest Service, 1908-1916, Co-founder CARE
- Ferdinand A. Silcox, Chief, U.S. Forest Service, 1933–1939
- David Martyn Smith, forester and educator, author of The Practice of Silviculture
- Eleanor Sterling 1993 PhD, conservationist and biologist, American Museum of Natural History
- Robert Y. Stuart, Chief, U.S. Forest Service, 1928–1933
- Dorceta E. Taylor 1985 MFS, 1991 PhD, environmental sociologist and preeminent scholars in the field of environmental justice, Yale University
- Rae Wynn-Grant 2010 MESc, large carnivore ecologist and a fellow with National Geographic Society.
