= Yale-Myers Forest =

Natural area in the U.S. state of Connecticut

Coordinates: 41.910°N 72.155°W

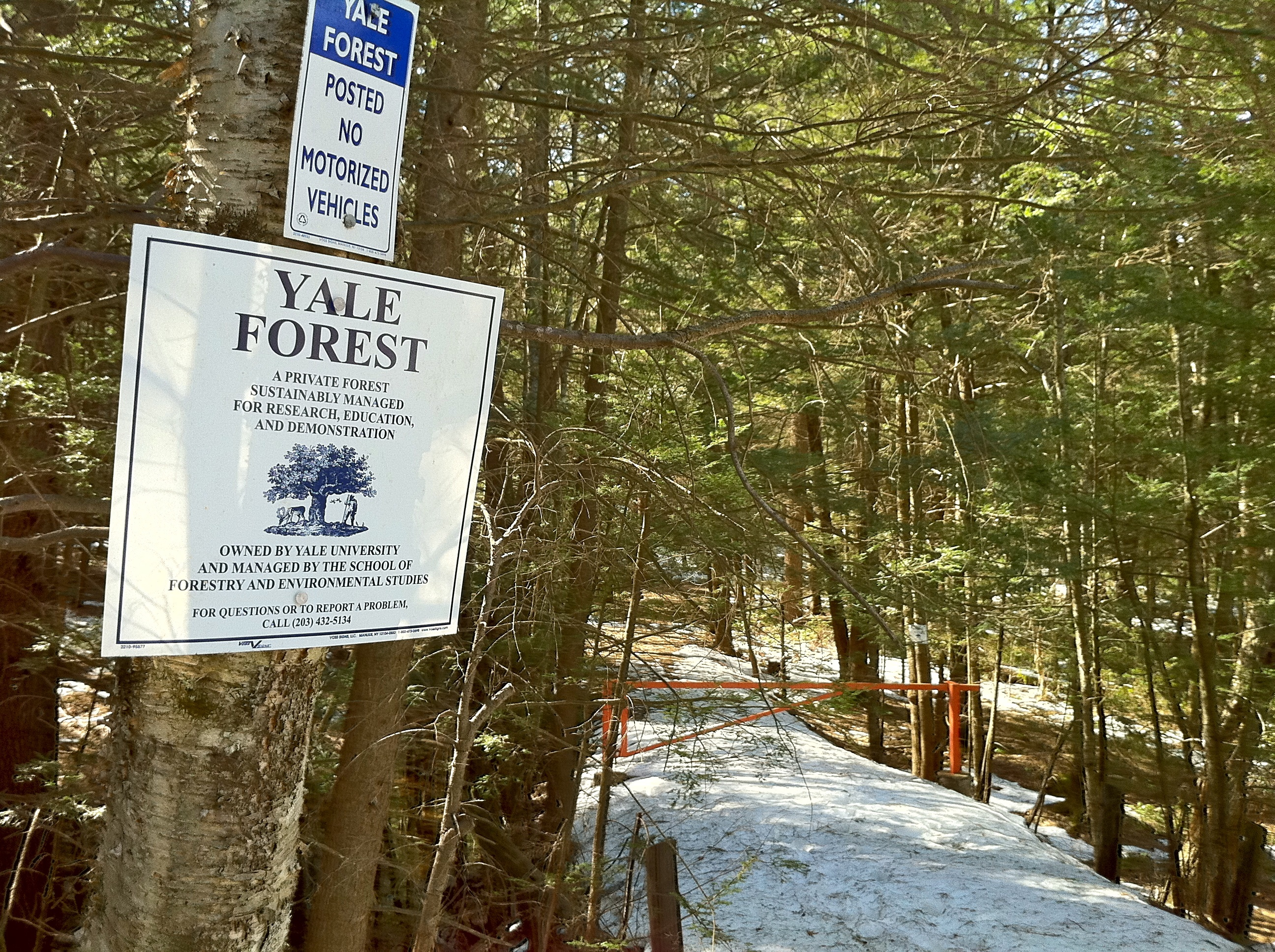
Yale-Myers Forest Signs and northern entrance to the Nipmuck Trail on Bigelow Hollow Road (Connecticut Route 197) near Bigelow Hollow State Park

The Yale-Myers Forest is a 7,840-acre (32 km^{2}) forest in Northeastern Connecticut owned by Yale University and administered by the Yale School of the Environment. Located in the towns of Union, Ashford, Eastford, and Woodstock, the forest is reputed to be the largest private landholding in the state.

The Yale-Myers Forest is managed according to a philosophy of multiple uses, with scientific research and teaching balanced with commercial timber production. The forest is traversed by the hiking path known as the Nipmuck Trail; this route is the only public access allowed except for permitted hunting in season.

The Yale-Myers Forest is a component of the Yale Forests system, which also includes the 1,100-acre (4.5 km^{2}) Yale-Toumey Forest in the towns of Swanzey and Keene in New Hampshire, and the 462-acre (1.9 km^{2}) Bowen Forest in Mount Holly, Vermont.

Boston Hollow is part of the Yale-Myers Forest.

== See also ==
- Quiet Corner
- Nipmuck Trail
