= Quinebaug Highlands =

Mountainous region in New England, USA

Coordinates: 42.03°N 72.10°W

The Quinebaug Highlands are a 172,000 acre region of mountains surrounding the Connecticut/Massachusetts border near Ashford, Eastford, Union, and Woodstock in Connecticut and Southbridge and Sturbridge in Massachusetts. It includes over 40,000 acres (160 km^{2}) acres of protected forest. The highlands are the source for several rivers, including the Quinebaug River, and are part of the Quinebaug and Shetucket Rivers Valley National Heritage Corridor.

The highest elevation is 1,315 ft (401 m) Burley Hill in Union, CT.

== Recreational Opportunities ==
The highlands many protected area offer opportunities for hiking, canoeing, kayaking, hunting and fishing. It is one of the few areas in Connecticut that offers back country camping.

== Mountains and protected areas of the Quinebaug Highlands ==
- Bigelow Hollow State Park
- Brimfield State Forest
- Burley Hill
- East Brimfield Lake
- Natchaug State Forest
- Nipmuck State Forest
- Norcross Wildlife Sanctuary
- Snow Hill
- Streeter Point Recreation Area
- Wells State Park
- Westville Lake
- Yale-Myers Forest
