= Mashapaug Lake =

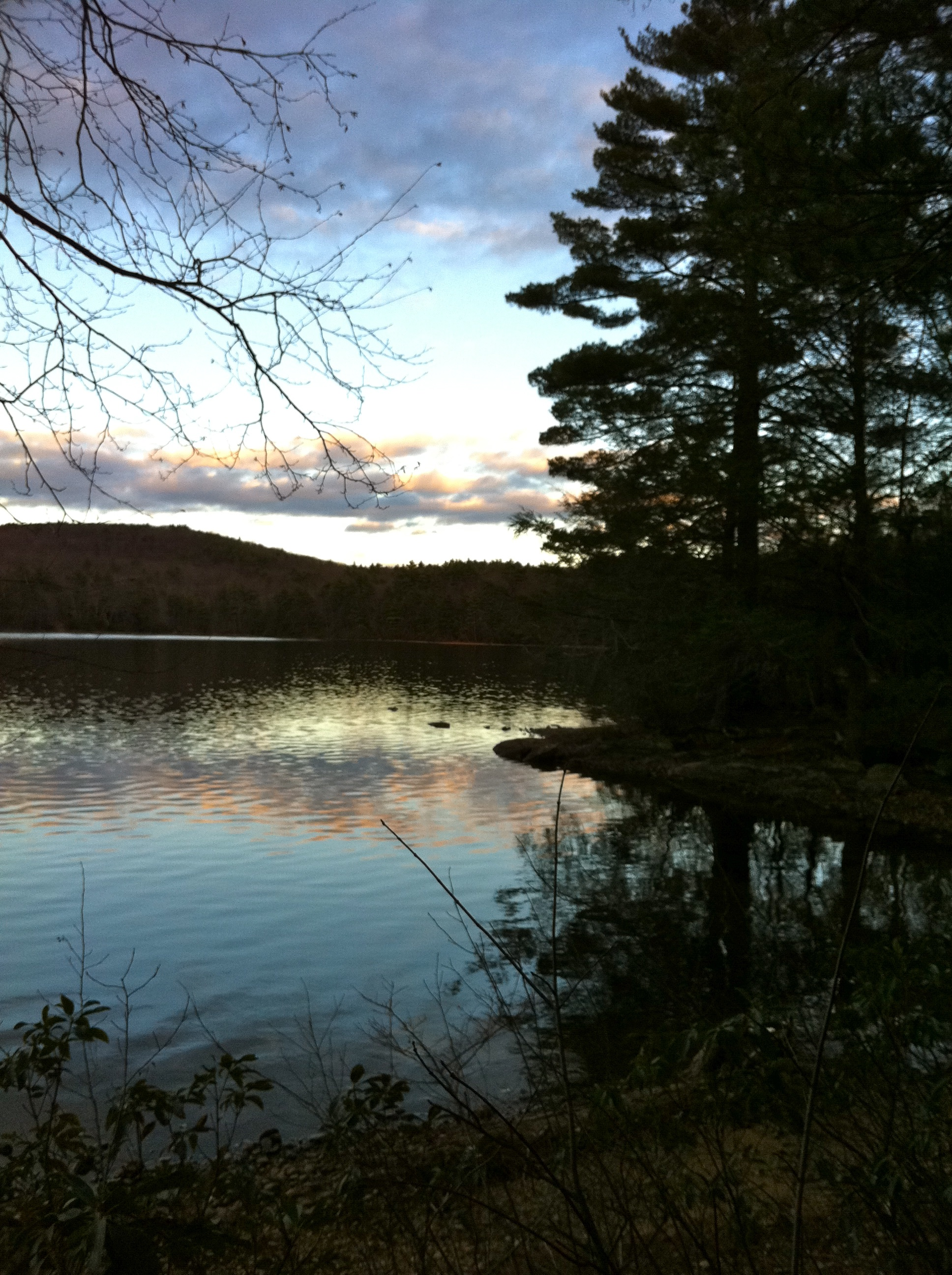
- Bigelow Hollow State Park looking north from the southern shore of Mashapaug Lake at sunset.

- Location within Connecticut
- Location: Union, CT, United States
- Coordinates: 42°01′00″N 72°08′00″W
- Type: Reservoir
- Primary inflows: Wells Brook, several intermittent streams
- Primary outflows: Bigelow Brook
- Basin countries: United States (Connecticut and Massachusetts)
- Max. length: 1.67 mi (2.69 km) approx.
- Max. width: 0.57 mi (0.92 km) approx.
- Surface area: 297 acres (120 ha)
- Average depth: 15 ft (4.6 m)
- Max. depth: 39.5 ft (12.0 m)
- Water volume: 1.45 billion US gallons (5.5 Gl)
- Surface elevation: 706 ft (215 m)
- Frozen: December through March (most winters)
- Islands: Several

Mashapaug Lake is a 297-acre (1.20 km^{2}) lake surrounded by Bigelow Hollow State Park and Nipmuck State Forest in the town of Union in northeastern Connecticut. The lake has a maximum depth of 39.5 feet (12.0 meters), and an average depth of 15 feet (4.6 meters). Its normal surface elevation is 706 feet (215 m). The lake is very popular with fishermen and boaters from the area, and can also be used for swimming.

== History ==
Mashapaug Lake is natural in origin, but the construction of two dams has raised its water level. One of these dams lies on the lake's northern end, at an outlet which flows into the Quinnebaug River system, while the other lies on the southern end, at the Bigelow Brook outlet. Water flows over the Bigelow Brook dam at the southern end of Mashapaug Lake at all times of the year. The dam at the northern end of the lake, however, is only used to drain the lake's water level during the winter.

== Description ==
The majority of Mashapaug Lake's bottom consists of gravel and sand, with some scattered boulders, trees, and stumps. In the deep, flat areas of the lake's bottom, fine sand, silt, and organic muck can be found. Mashapaug Lake is fed by Wells Brook and several intermittent streams. It drains south into Bigelow Brook, but when the water level is lowered for the winter, water is pumped north into the Quinnebaug River system.

== Development ==
Sparse residential housing can be found along the shores of Mashapaug Lake, and also on two of the islands. The northern and northwestern shores of the lake, however, are more densely populated than the rest of the lake. Where there are no houses, the lake's shoreline is heavily forested, with the Bigelow Hollow State Park surrounding the southern and southwestern areas of the lake.

== Recreation ==
Mashapaug Lake is open to the public for fishing and boating. Ice fishing on the lake is popular during the winter months. People can also swim in the lake. Visitors can access the Mashapaug Lake through Bigelow Hollow State Park at its southern end. A boat launch can be found at this access point.

== Flora and fauna ==
Aquatic vegetation is quite sparse in most areas of Mashapaug Lake, except in certain areas of shallow water; although recently, infrequent lowering of the lake during the wintertime has increased shoreline aquatic vegetation. Some plants that can be found in the shallows are yellow pond-lily (Nuphar variegata), pickerel weed (Pontederia cordata), and pondweeds (Potamogeton spp.).

Many species of fish reside within Mashapaug Lake. These species include sunfish, yellow perch, chain pickerel, largemouth bass, smallmouth bass, brown trout, rainbow trout, and channel catfish. The Connecticut Department of Environmental Protection stocks the lake with brown and rainbow trout. Two state records were set from fish caught at Mashapaug Lake. The heaviest largemouth bass ever caught in Connecticut was caught in Mashapaug Lake in 1961 (12 lbs. 14 oz.), and the heaviest channel catfish ever caught in the state was caught there in 2004 (29 lbs. 39 oz.).
