= Bigelow Brook =

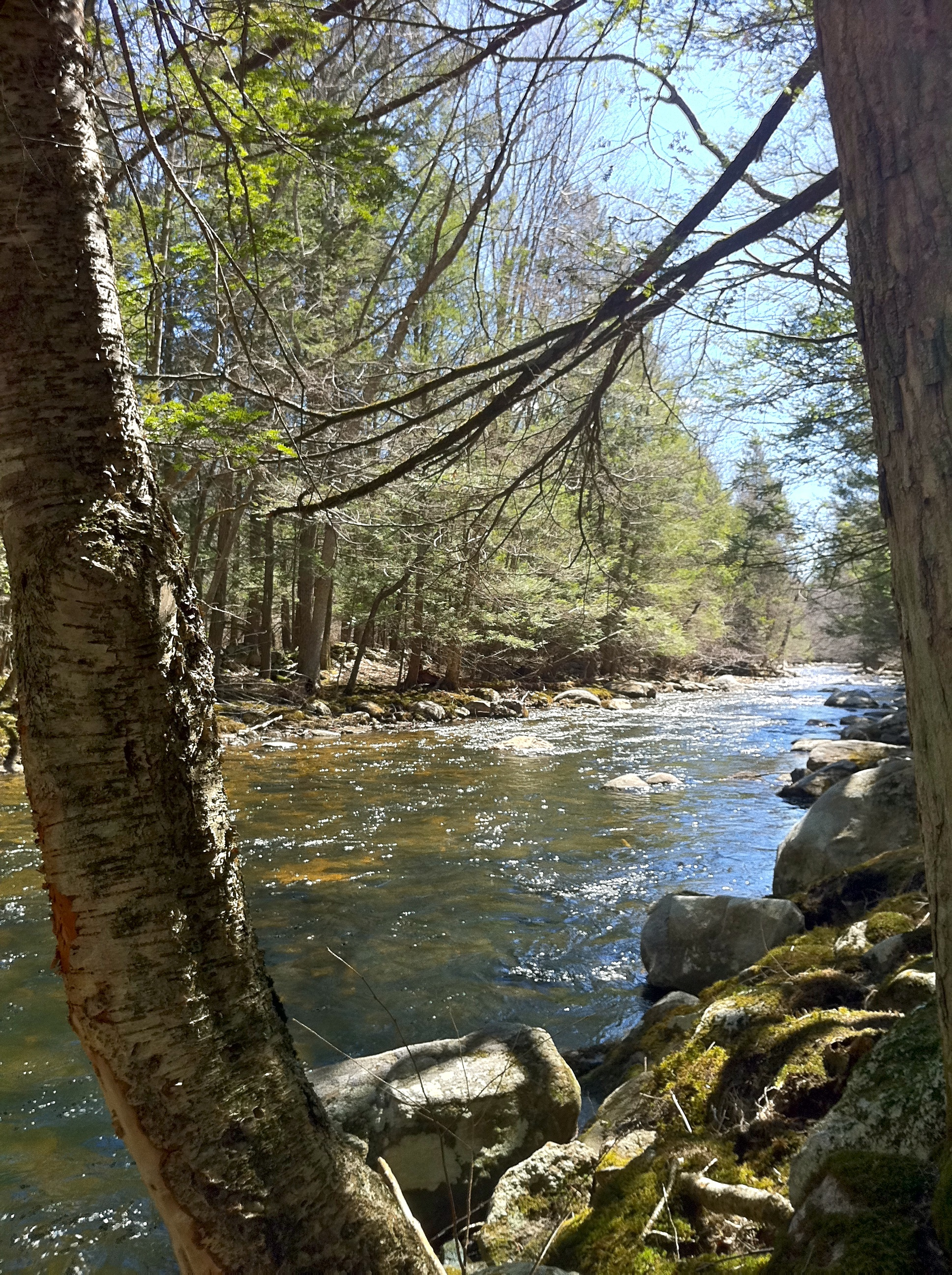
- Bigelow Brook in Eastford, CT, along the Natchaug Trail.

- Location of the mouth within Connecticut

Location
- Country: United States
- State: Connecticut
- Counties: Tolland, Windham

Physical characteristics
- Source: Mashapaug Lake
  - location: Union, CT, Tolland County, Connecticut, United States
  - coordinates: 42.00524°N 72.12868°W
  - elevation: 705 ft (215 m)
- Mouth: Confluence with Still River
  - location: Eastford, Connecticut, Windham County, Connecticut, United States
  - coordinates: 41.86403°N 72.09010°W
  - elevation: 420 ft (130 m)approx.

Bigelow Brook is a river in northeastern Connecticut, flowing from Mashapaug Lake in Union to its confluence with the Still River in Eastford.

Bigelow Brook is formed in Union, Connecticut at the outflow of Mashapaug Lake. After leaving the lake, it flows south through the Bigelow Hollow State Park in Union, and into Bigelow Pond. After exiting Bigelow Pond, the brook flows to the southwest and then into Myers Pond. After flowing out of Myers Pond, Bigelow Brook begins flowing to the south. It then leaves Union and serves as the border between the towns of Ashford, Connecticut, and Eastford, Connecticut. The brook then changes direction and starts flowing to the east, into the town of Eastford. It turns again shortly after, back to the south, and continues on a generally southerly or south-southeasterly path through Eastford. Bigelow Brook eventually ends at its confluence with the Still River, forming the Natchaug River.

Bigelow Brook is popular with fishermen from the area. Trout are one type of fish that swim in its waters.

== Tributaries ==
Tributaries of Bigelow Brook include (from north to south) Gulf Brook, Bush Meadow Brook, Lead Mine Brook, Branch Brook, Warren Brook, Walker Brook, and Stones Brook.

== See also ==
- List of rivers of Connecticut
