= Breakneck Pond =

Lake in Tolland County, Connecticut, United States

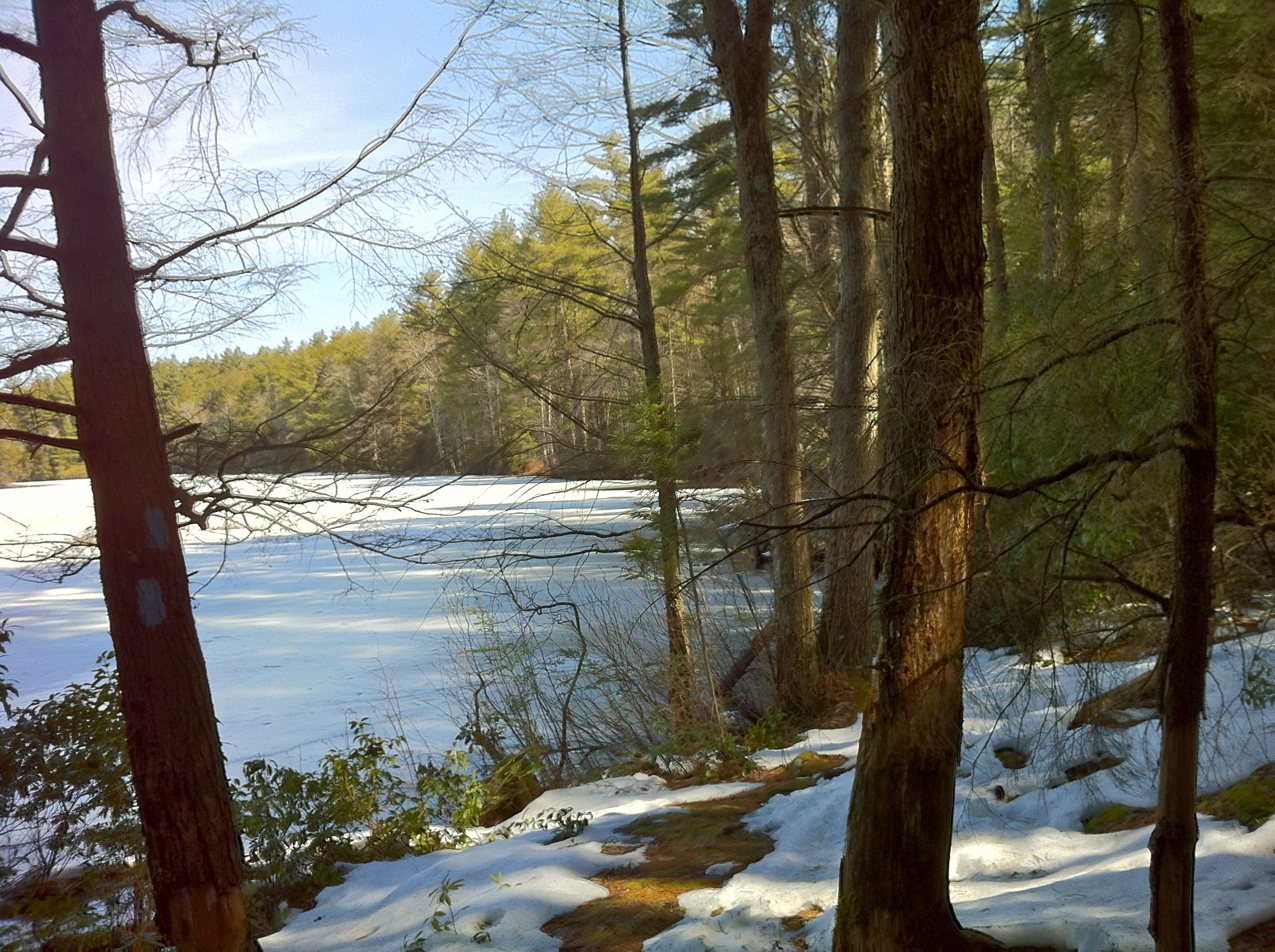
- Southern Breakneck Pond on Nipmuck Trail facing north on the last day of winter.

- Location within Connecticut
- Location: Tolland County, Connecticut
- Coordinates: 42°01′17″N 72°06′36″W
- Type: lake
- Surface area: 92 acres (0.37 km^{2})
- Max. depth: 12 ft (3.7 m)

Breakneck Pond is a 92-acre (0.37 km^{2}) lake surrounded by the Nipmuck State Forest in Union, Connecticut. A small portion of the lake extends into Sturbridge, Massachusetts. The maximum depth of the lake is 12 feet (3.7 m). The entire lake shore is undeveloped and motorized vehicles and boats are prohibited. The lake is accessible through trails from Bigelow Hollow State Park and camping is permitted at three locations around the lake. It is also the northern terminus for the Nipmuck Trail.
