= Union Green Historic District =

Historic district in Connecticut, United States

- U.S. National Register of Historic Places
- U.S. Historic district
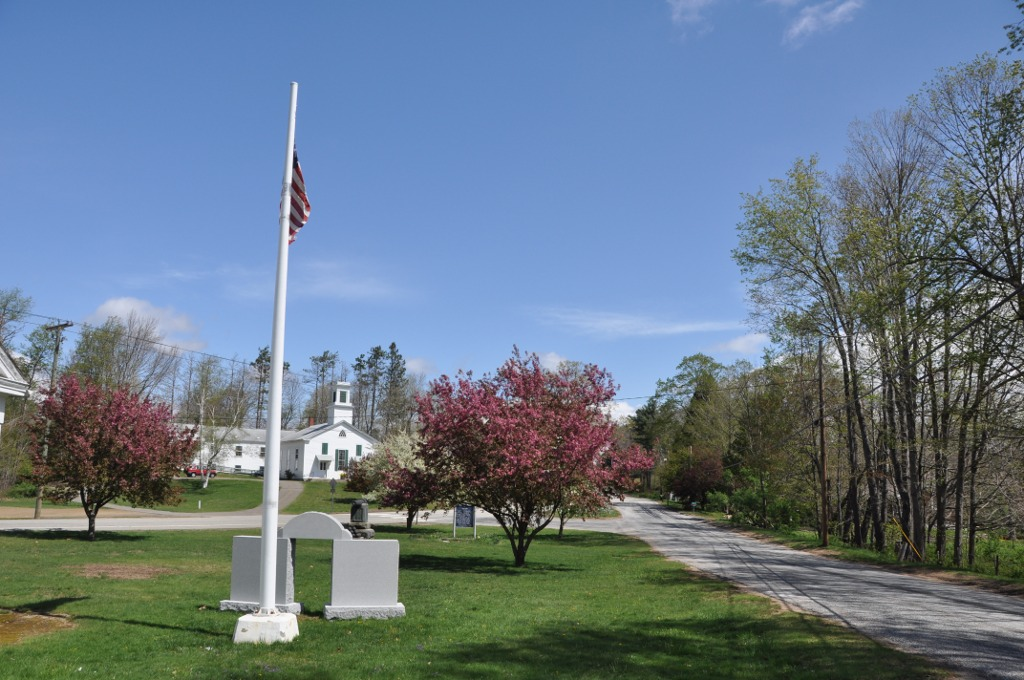

- Location within Connecticut Location within the United States
- Location: Roughly, area North of Junction of Buckley Highway and Cemetery Road to Junction of Kinney Hollow and Town Hall Roads, Union, Connecticut
- Coordinates: 41°59′23″N 72°9′36″W
- Architect: Marcy, Merrick
- Architectural style: Colonial Revival, Italian Villa
- NRHP reference No.: 90001099
- Added to NRHP: July 19, 1990

The Union Green is the town green of the New England town of Union, Connecticut. The Green is a small town-owned wedge at the north end of a triangle park area (known as Union Grove) formed by Town Hall Road, Buckley Highway and Kinney Hollow Road. The Green, Union Grove, and properties to the north along Route 190 are listed on the National Register of Historic Places as the Union Green Historic District. The historic district contains 16 buildings, 3 sites, and 2 objects over an area of 300 acres (1.2 km^{2}).

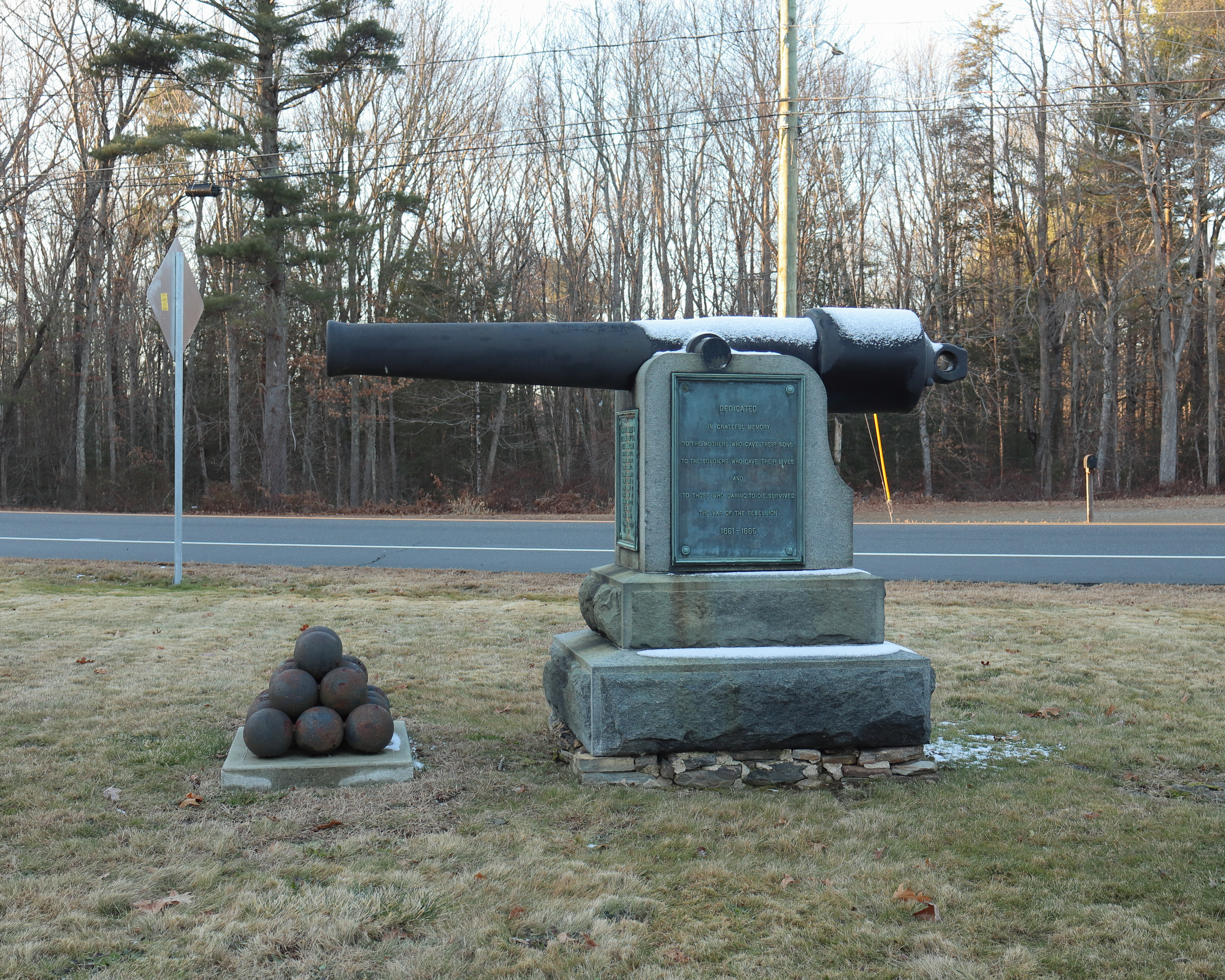
This memorial cannon dedicated to those from Union who fought in the American Civil War, as well as to the "mothers who gave their sons," sits on the town green.

The Old Town Hall (now a historical society museum) is the dominant feature on the Green.

Several town buildings, specifically the former town hall, library, Congregational Church, the Union School and former district school, and cemetery, are located around the Green. There are only two houses located around the immediate perimeter of Union Green. The oldest is the one built by Ezra Horton in 1759. The other is a newer house constructed in 1956.

Although the larger Union Grove to the west of the green is privately owned, it is used for public celebrations. Also in the Grove near the intersection of Kinney Hollow and Town Hall Roads is a rough-hewn granite slab with a bronze commemorative plaque honoring the site of the first meetinghouse.

In addition to serving a commemorative function, the green is used as a meeting place for parades and other town events. An Old Home Day celebration is held at the pavilion on the third weekend of August when there is a barbecue and an evening dance.

The green and surrounding buildings are significant as a historic district for their evoking "the location's historic role as the town's political, religious, educational and social center", for preserving examples of architecture, and for 18th century stonecarved funerary art included in the cemetery.

== See also ==
- Ellington Center Historic District
- Somers Historic District
- National Register of Historic Places listings in Tolland County, Connecticut
