= Somersville Historic District =

Historic district in Connecticut, United States

- U.S. National Register of Historic Places
- U.S. Historic district
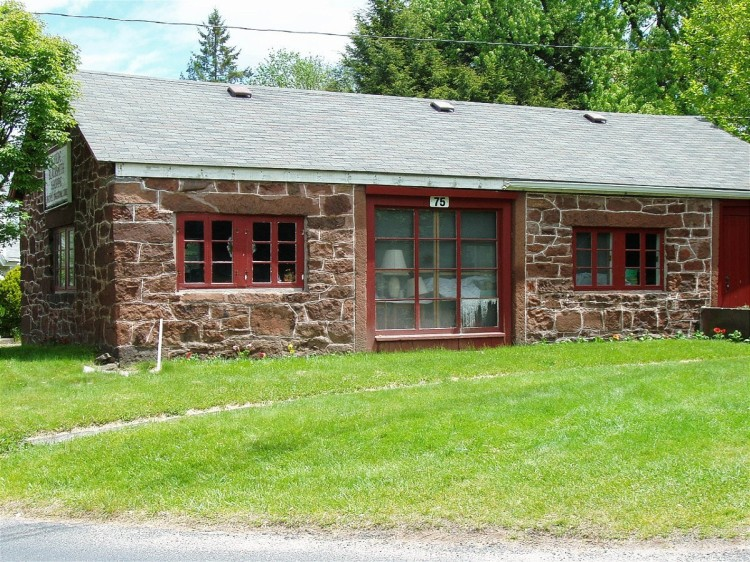
- Ye Olde Blacksmith

- Location within Connecticut Location within the United States
- Location: Roughly, along Main, Maple and School Streets, Pinney and Shaker Road and Quality Avenue, Somers, Connecticut
- Coordinates: 41°58′52″N 72°29′24″W
- Area: 155 acres (63 ha)
- Architectural style: Colonial, Greek Revival, Post-Medieval English
- NRHP reference No.: 95000401
- Added to NRHP: April 13, 1995

The Somersville Historic District encompasses the historic components of the mill village of Somersville in western Somers, Connecticut, United States. The district is centered on a mill complex on the Scantic River, which divides the district. The most significant years of development were between about 1835 and 1935, although the area has a history (and surviving structures) dating to the 1760s. The district was listed on the National Register of Historic Places in 1995. The Mill itself has since burned down and as of October 2018 is currently open field, although the canal structure remains in place.

== Description and history ==
The town of Somers was settled in the 17th century as part of the Agawam Plantation (now Springfield, Massachusetts), was separately incorporated in 1739, and transferred to the jurisdiction of the Connecticut Colony in 1749. The area that became Somersville village grew around a sawmill and gristmill established on the Scantic River, but remained little more than a rural crossroads village until 1835. In that year, Spencer & Chaffee were the first in a series of proprietors to use the mill privilege for the production of textiles. In 1853 the business was acquired by Holmes & Reynolds, which expanded the mill. It operated through the American Civil War, producing satinet, but closed a few years later. In 1879 the mill was purchased by the Somersville Manufacturing Company, which built the present three-story brick building, and greatly expanded and modernized its production capacity over the next decades. The company also built large numbers of surviving mill housing beginning about 1885, including a significant number of multiunit and tenement-style buildings.

The historic district is roughly T-shaped, the base of the T extending along Maple Street on either side of the mill complex. At its northern end it meets Main Street (Connecticut Route 190), which forms the top of the T, extending westward from the Maple Street junction and eastward just beyond School Street (whose section between Main and Maple Streets is also included in the district). Most of the district consists of vernacular residential architecture built for housing mill workers, although there are a few houses that date to the area's 18th-century period. The district also includes 19th-century retail buildings, two churches, and a school.

== See also ==
- Somers Historic District, also NRHP-listed in Somers
- National Register of Historic Places listings in Tolland County, Connecticut
