= Bigelow Hollow State Park =

State park in Connecticut, United States

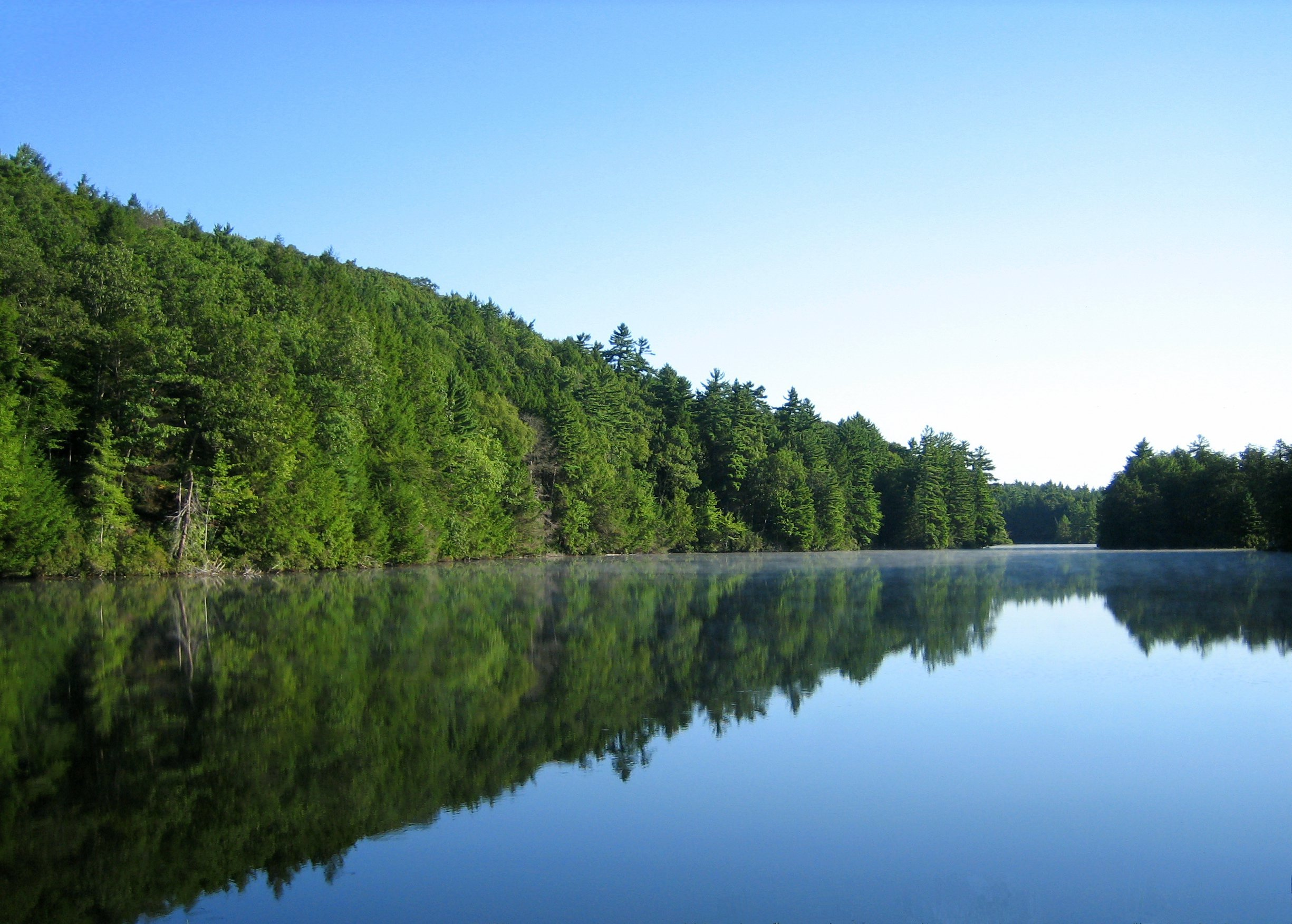
- Bigelow Pond, near the park entrance

- Location within Connecticut Location within the United States
- Interactive map of Bigelow Hollow State Park
- Location: Union, Connecticut, United States
- Coordinates: 41°59′41″N 72°07′43″W
- Area: 516 acres (209 ha)
- Elevation: 640 ft (200 m)
- Established: 1949
- Administrator: Connecticut Department of Energy and Environmental Protection
- Designation: Connecticut state park
- Website: Official website

Bigelow Hollow State Park is a public recreation area in the town of Union, Connecticut, in the Quinebaug Highlands. The state park's 516 acres (209 ha) border Nipmuck State Forest on the east and west and Mashapaug Lake on the north. The park and forest are located in a large hollow or depression approximately 700' below the surrounding ridgelines. They are managed by the Connecticut Department of Energy and Environmental Protection.

== Surroundings ==
The state park is a significant feature of the Last Green Valley National Heritage Corridor and is part of one of the largest unbroken forest tracts in Connecticut, which includes 9,000 acres (3,600 ha) in the Nipmuck State Forest, 7,800 acres (3,200 ha) in the Yale-Myers Forest, 13,000 acres (5,300 ha) in the Natchaug State Forest, 8,000 acres (3,200 ha) of the Norcross Wildlife Refuge, and the 7,000 acres (2,800 ha) of forest held by Hull Foresters. The state park was carved out of Nipmuck State Forest by the State Park and Forest Commission in 1949.

== Activities and amenities ==
The park has been described as "[r]emote by Connecticut standards," where a map and orienteering skills may be useful as the park is mostly evergreen at lower elevations and trails can be lost in the thick forest density. The park and forest have over 35 miles (56 km) of trails, including several around 92-acre (37 ha) Breakneck Pond, a secluded lake only accessible by foot. A boat launch and picnicking facilities are located on 25-acre (10 ha) Bigelow Pond at the entrance to the park and on 287-acre (116 ha) Mashapaug Lake, which is found near the end of the park's main road.

Fishing is offered in summer and winter (ice fishing). The streams, ponds and lakes feature stocked as well as native trout, small and large mouth bass and pickerel. Backcountry camping is allowed in Nipmuck State Forest. Snowmobiling trails begin in the state park and continue into the state forest.
