= West Thompson Lake =

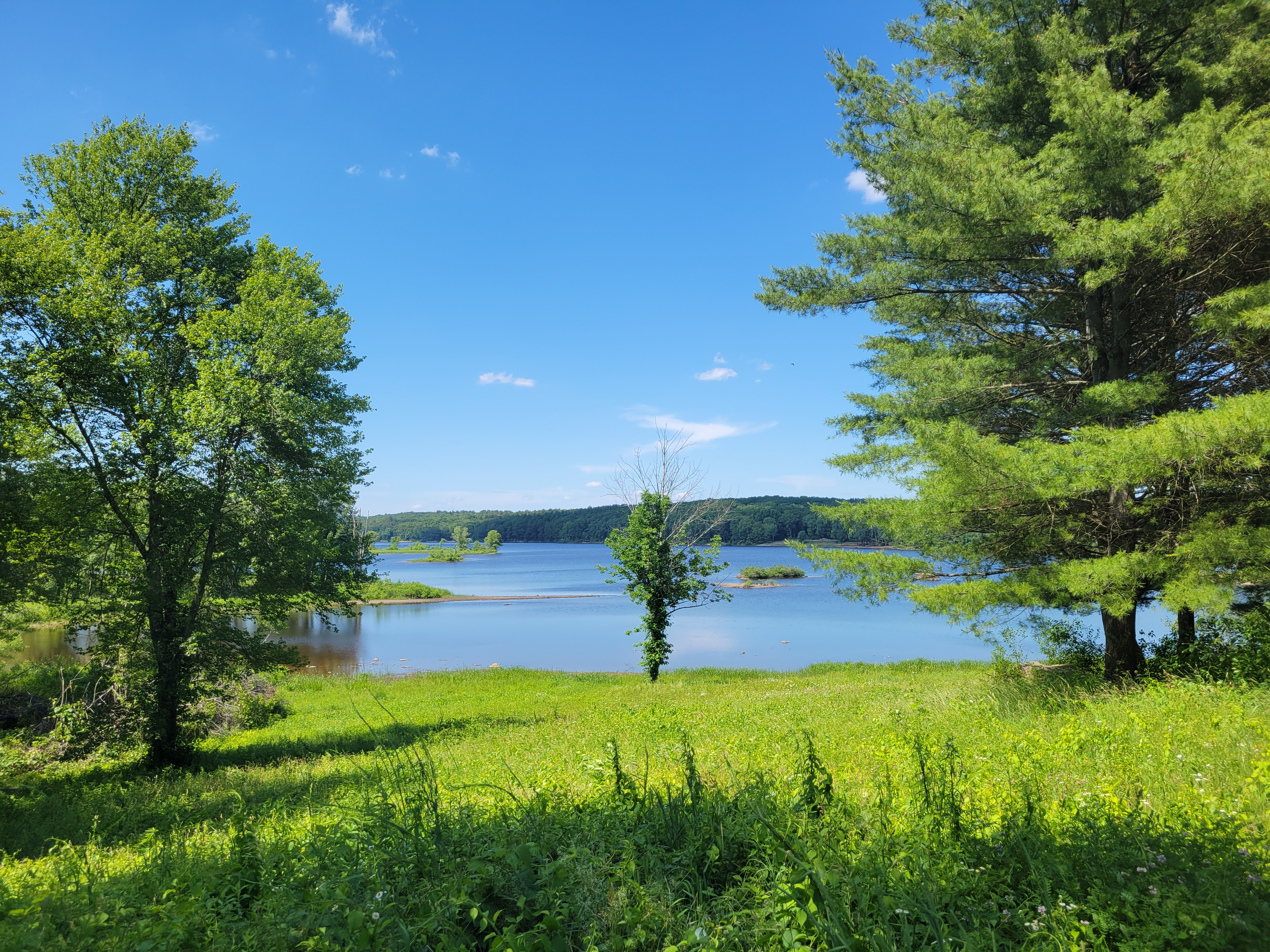
- West Thompson Lake

- Location in Connecticut
- Location: Thompson, Connecticut
- Coordinates: 41°57′15″N 71°54′13″W
- Type: Reservoir
- River sources: Quinebaug River
- Built: 1965
- Max. length: 1.35 miles (2.17 km)
- Max. width: 1,360 feet (410 m)
- Surface area: 195 acres (79 ha) permanent pool; 1,250 acres (510 ha) at full capacity
- Average depth: 21.4 feet (6.5 m)
- Max. depth: 50.5 feet (15.4 m)
- Residence time: 4.6 days
- Surface elevation: 305 feet (93 m)
- Website: West Thompson Lake

West Thompson Lake is a 200-acre lake in Thompson, Windham County, Connecticut.

A dam was constructed in 1965 by the United States Army Corps of Engineers to create the lake. It impounds the Quinebaug River for flood control and seasonal storm water management. The dam is owned and operated by the Corps of Engineers.

The dam is one of the six flood control structures built on the river. This network of dams helps control flooding all the way from the upstream tributaries of the Thames River to the Long Island Sound. The West Thompson Dam was constructed in 1965. It cost 6.7 million U.S. dollars.

The West Thompson Lake has a total storage capacity of 342 million gallons of flood water.

== Natural resources ==
West Thompson Lake contains a myriad of natural resources, including diverse habitats, landscapes, plant life, and wildlife. The 1,857 acres of land around the lake is managed by Park Rangers. Of the total area, approximately 1,125 acres are forests. The forests consist of eastern white pine, oak, and shagbark hickory, birch and maple.

Recreation includes fishing, boating, hunting and hiking, along with an 18-hole disc golf course. Camping is available as well.
