= Butts Bridge =

- U.S. National Register of Historic Places
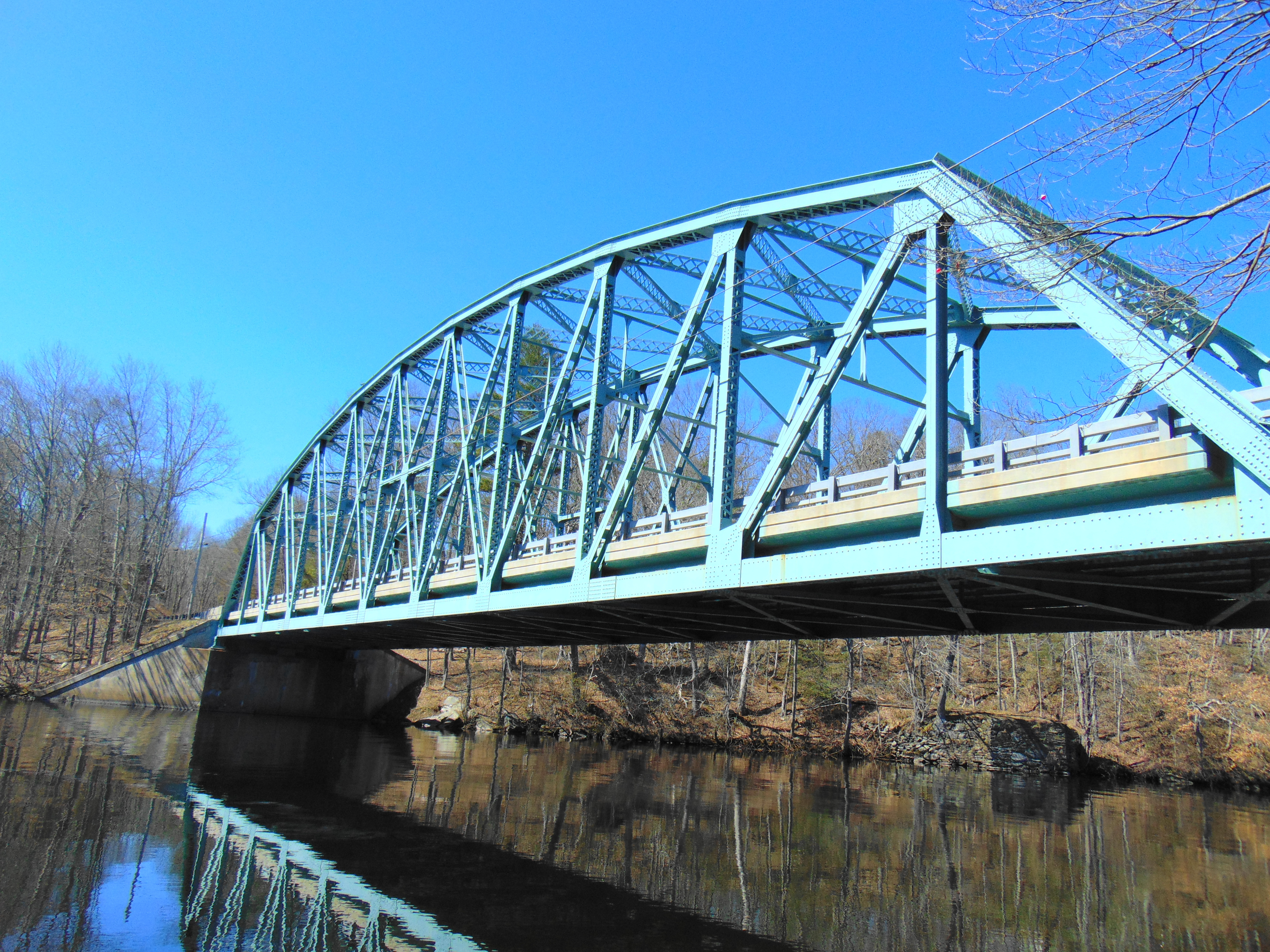
- Butts Bridge

- Location within Connecticut Location within the United States
- Location: Butts Bridge Road over Quinebaug River, Canterbury, Connecticut
- Coordinates: 41°39′5″N 71°58′15″W
- Area: 0.2 acres (0.081 ha)
- Built: 1936
- Architect: Connecticut State Highway Dept.
- Architectural style: Parker through truss
- NRHP reference No.: 10000272
- Added to NRHP: May 24, 2010

The Butts Bridge carries Butts Bridge Road (Connecticut Route 668) over the Quinebaug River in the town of Canterbury, Connecticut. It is a well-preserved example of a Parker truss, built in 1937, late in the state's regular use of steel truss bridge designs. The bridge is also known as Bridge No. 1649 and carries an average of 2,300 vehicles per day as of 2011. It was listed on the National Register of Historic Places in 2010.

== Description and history ==
The Butts Bridge is located in a rural setting of southeastern Canterbury, spanning the Quinebaug River in a roughly east–west orientation. The bridge is a single-span steel Parker truss design that typifies truss bridges of the early automotive age. It is 231 feet 6 inches (70.56 m) long, and is 31 feet (9.4 m) between the centers of the trusses. The trusses are mounted on concrete abutments, and the roadway is supported by concrete decking.

The bridge is at least the fourth to stand in this general area, which has been on the route of a road between Norwich and Plainfield since colonial days. Earlier wood-frame bridges and wrought iron lenticular truss bridges were probably located further downstream, but their sites have not been located. The bridge this one replaced in 1936-37 was located just upstream; traces of its abutments survive. This bridge was completed in 1937 by the Fort Pitt Bridge Works company using designs by the Connecticut State Highway Department. It was built as part of the Highway Department's emergency relief program after major flooding in 1936.

== Gallery ==
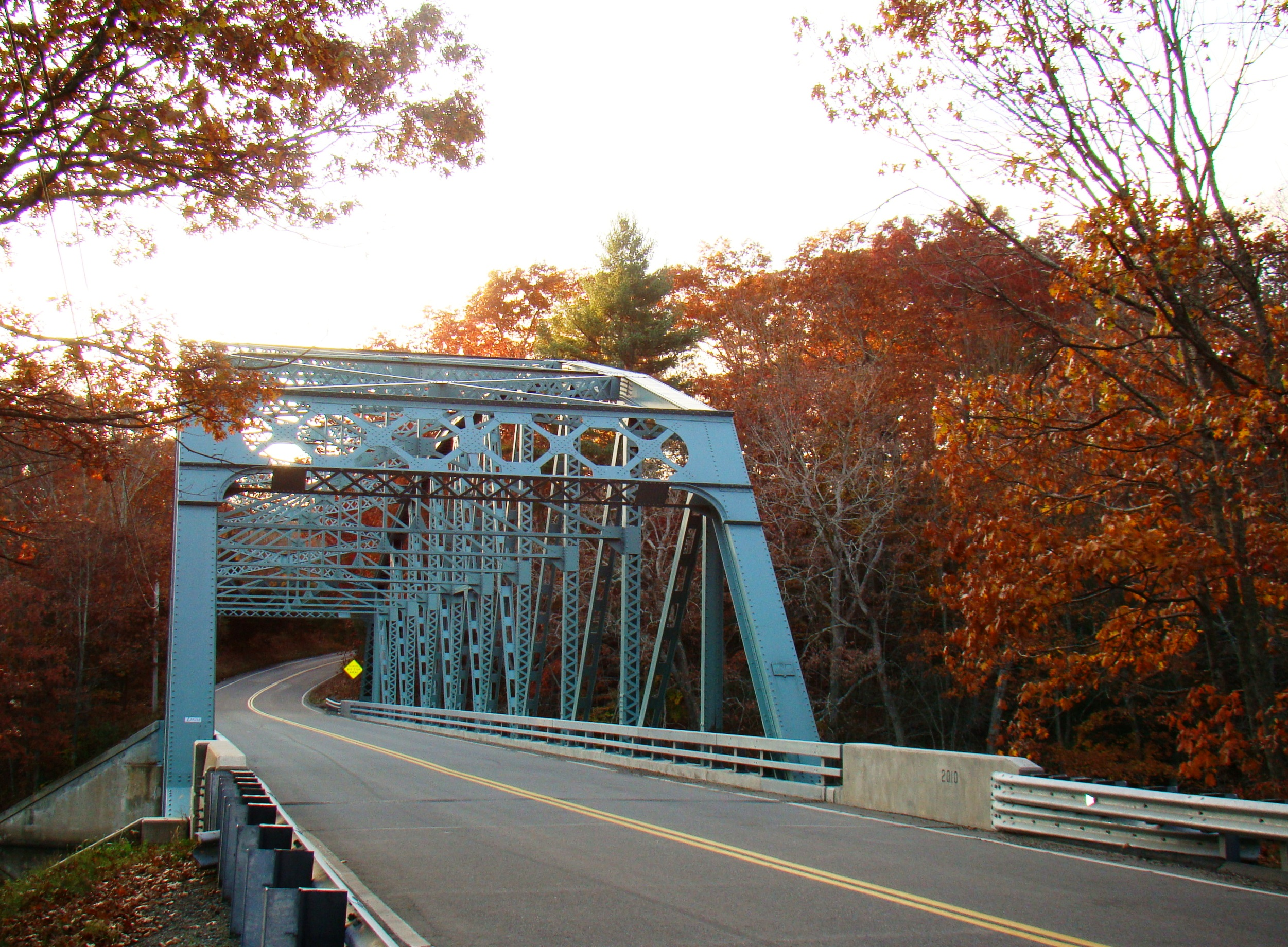
Connecticut Route 668

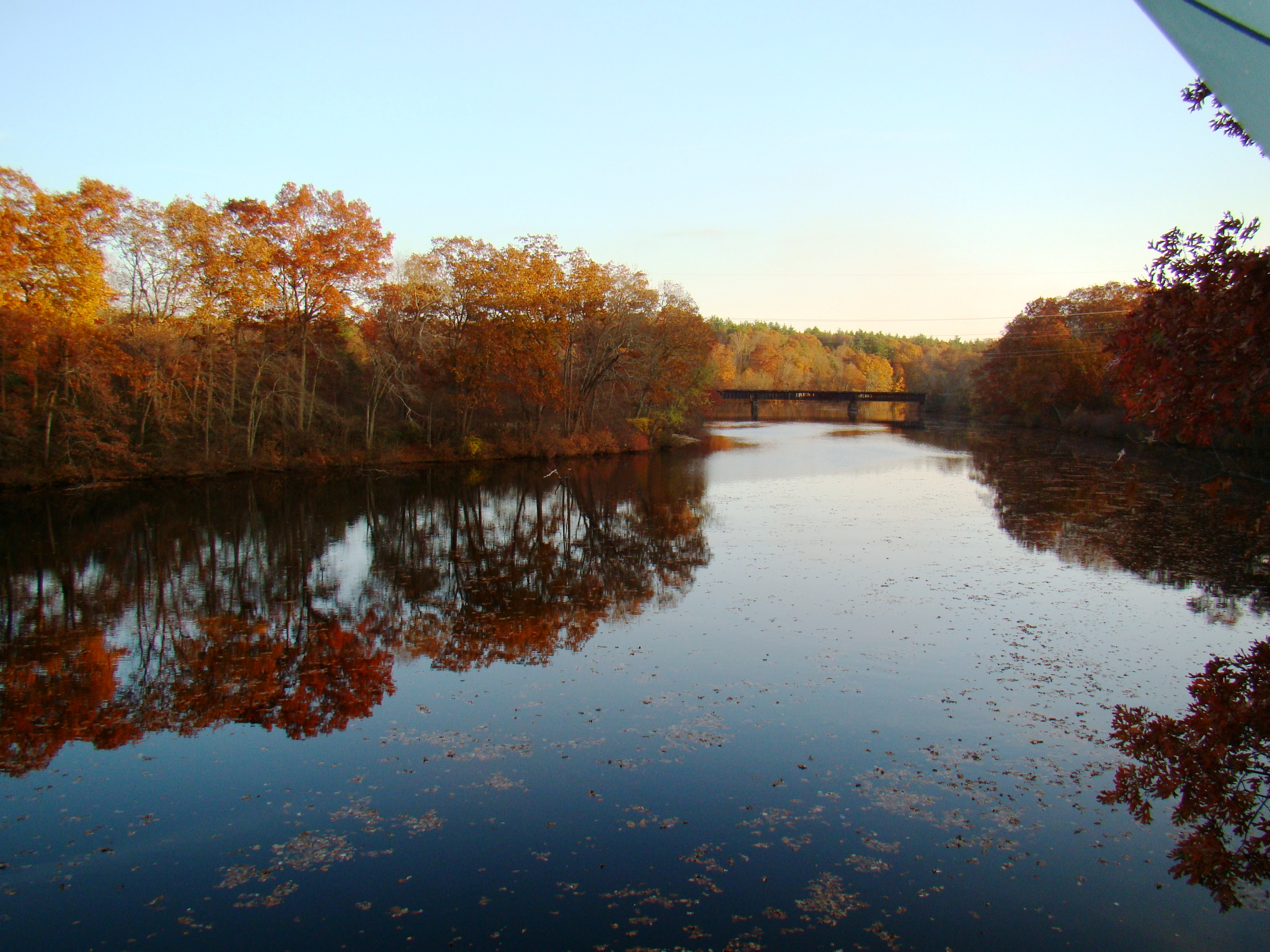
Quinebaug River from Butts Bridge

== See also ==
- National Register of Historic Places listings in Windham County, Connecticut
- List of bridges on the National Register of Historic Places in Connecticut
