= Somers Historic District =

Historic district in Connecticut, United States

- U.S. National Register of Historic Places
- U.S. Historic district
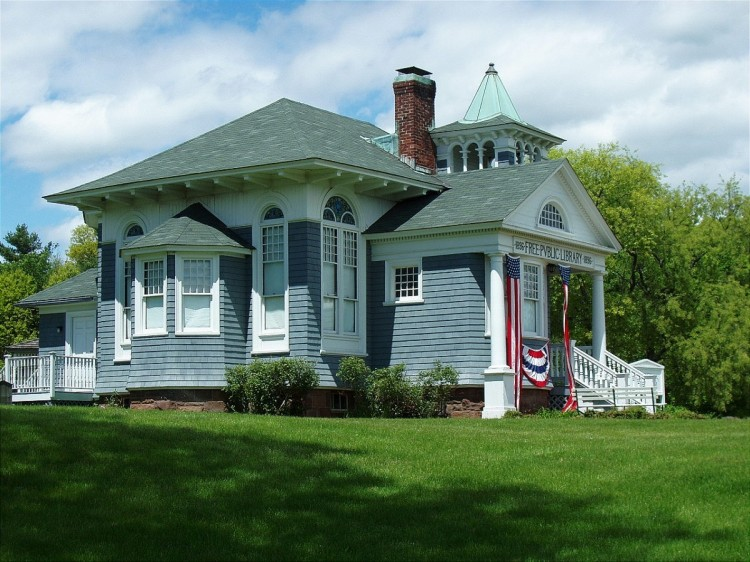
- The former Free Public Library building

- Location within Connecticut Location within the United States
- Location: Main and Battle Streets, Bugbee Lane, and Springfield Road, Somers, Connecticut
- Coordinates: 41°59′7″N 72°26′48″W
- Area: 100 acres (40 ha)
- Architect: Multiple
- Architectural style: Greek Revival, Colonial, Federal
- NRHP reference No.: 82004389
- Added to NRHP: September 23, 1982

The Somers Historic District encompasses the historic civic and social center of the town of Somers, Connecticut. It stretches along Main Street, with extensions along Springfield Road and Battle Street, and includes a significant number of vernacular Federal and Greek Revival houses. It includes the town's early churches, as well as important civic buildings, including the town hall and library. The district was listed on the National Register of Historic Places in 1982.

== Description and history ==
The area that is now Somers was settled in the 17th century as part of Agawam Plantation (now Springfield, Massachusetts). It was separately incorporated out of Enfield in 1734, with jurisdiction transferred to the Connecticut Colony in 1749. The town has been primarily agricultural for much of its history, although there was a mill village at Somersville. The town flourished first with fruit production and then with tobacco and dairy production in the 19th century. The town center, located at the junction Main Street (Connecticut Route 190) with Springfield and South Streets (Connecticut Route 83), has been its civic and social center throughout. Important buildings, including early churches and schools, were located here, and the placement of similar buildings later has reinforced its importance in this role.

The historic district is 100 acres (40 ha) in size, and stretches along Main Street, with extensions along Springfield Road and Battle Street. Most of the buildings are early 19th-century residences, with Federal or Greek Revival style, although there are a selection of later 19th century styles represented as well. The older properties are largely clustered in three places: on Springfield Road near Main, the eastern end of Main Street, and the area just west of where the modern (1950) town hall stands.

== See also ==
- Ellington Center Historic District
- Somersville Historic District, also NRHP-listed in Somers
- Union Green Historic District
- National Register of Historic Places listings in Tolland County, Connecticut
