= Norcross Wildlife Sanctuary =

Wildlife refuge in Monson, Massachusetts, US

Coordinates: 42°3′18.5″N 72°16′0.0″W

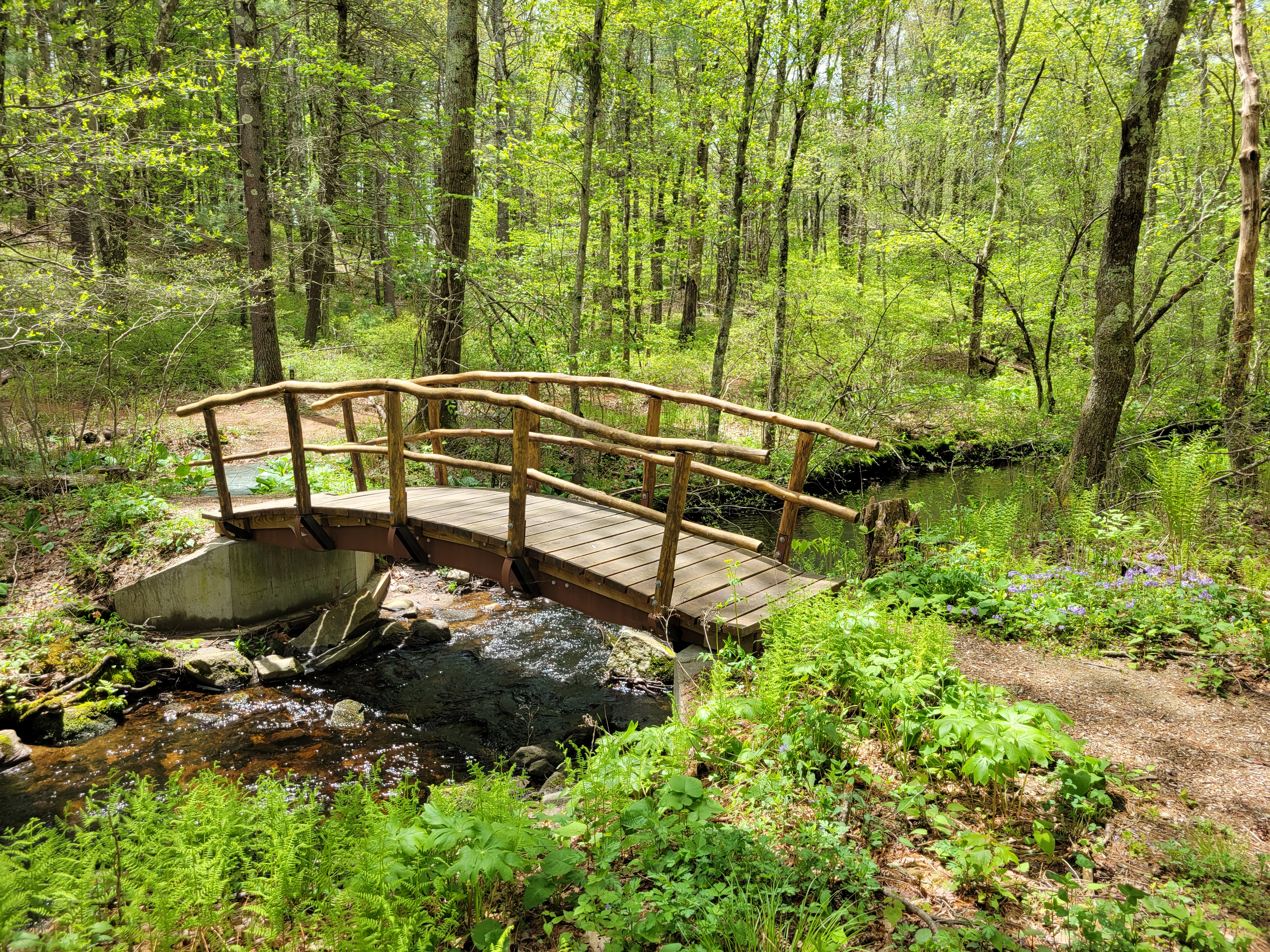
Footbridge at the Norcross Wildlife Sanctuary

The Norcross Wildlife Sanctuary is a wildlife refuge in Monson, Massachusetts. Founded by Arthur Norcross in 1939, the 8,000 acre wildlife refuge was established to preserve, protect and propagate native flora and fauna. The refuge is part of the Norcross Wildlife Foundation, which awards loans and grants, and has helped preserve over 33,000 acres since 1939.

== Natural history ==
Much of the refuge is part of the Quinebaug Highlands, which in turn is part of the Eastern New England Uplift.

== Trails and recreation ==
The sanctuary has 2.5 miles of trails. The refuge offers programs throughout the year.
