= Snow Hill (Connecticut) =

Hill in Windham County, Connecticut, United States

Coordinates: 41.954°N 72.210°W

Snow Hill is a 1210' hill located in the NW corner of Ashford, Connecticut and is the highest point in Windham County Connecticut. It is in the Nipmuck State Forest and adjacent to the Connecticut Mountain Laurel Sanctuary.

There is an FCC RCO located near the top of the hill.
