= Burley Hill (Connecticut) =

Hill in Union, Connecticut, US

- Location within Connecticut

Highest point
- Elevation: 1,316 ft (401 m)
- Coordinates: 42°01′01″N 72°12′31″W

Geography
- Location: Union, Connecticut

Climbing
- Easiest route: Private road, bushwack

Burley Hill is a 1,316-foot (401 m) hill in Union, Connecticut. It is the highest point in Tolland County and the highest point in eastern Connecticut. It is one of Connecticut's highest named summits and it ranks 6th in the state for prominence at 669 feet (204 m).

It is the most isolated peak in Connecticut and ranks 47th out of 50 for separation. The nearest summit above 1316' is 1387' Asnebumskit Hill in Massachusetts, 25.2 miles (40.6 km) away.
