= East Brimfield Dam =

Coordinates: 42°06′30″N 72°07′34″W

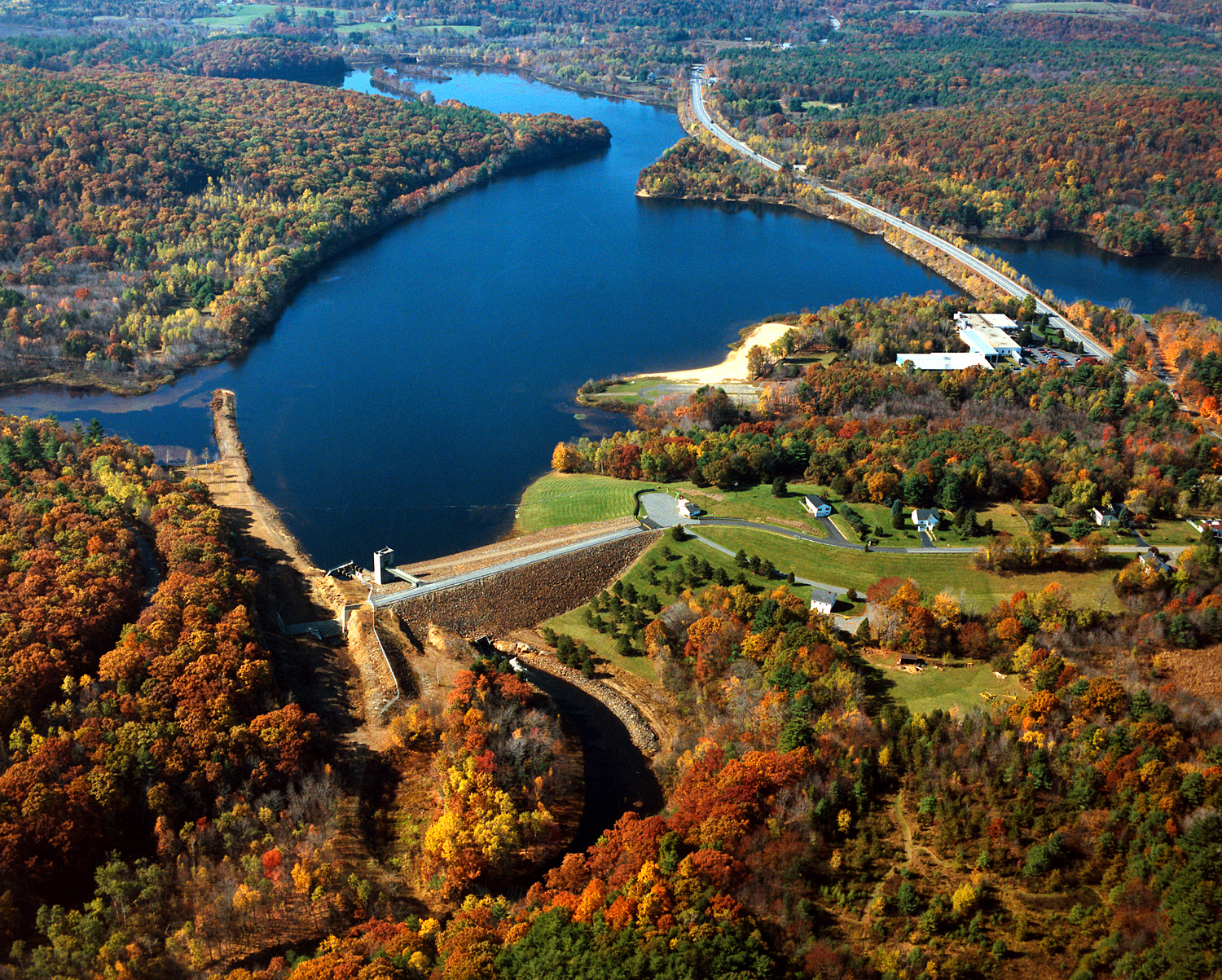
- East Brimfield Dam and Lake
- Interactive map of East Brimfield Dam
- Official name: East Brimfield Dam
- Location: Sturbridge, Massachusetts
- Construction began: 1958
- Opening date: 1960
- Operator: Army Corps of Engineers

Dam and spillways
- Impounds: Quinebaug River
- Height: 55 ft (17 m)
- Length: 520 ft (160 m)
- Width (crest): 24 ft (7.3 m)
- Width (base): 280 ft (85 m)

Reservoir
- Creates: East Brimfield Reservoir

The East Brimfield Dam is located on the Quinebaug River in Sturbridge, Massachusetts, approximately 20 miles (32 km) southwest of Worcester, Massachusetts.

Designed and constructed by the United States Army Corps of Engineers, this dam substantially reduces flooding along the Quinebaug and Thames rivers. Construction of the project began in 1958 with completion in 1960 at a cost of $6,580,000.

The East Brimfield Reservoir, located in Sturbridge and Brimfield to its west, lies within the Quinebaug River Watershed and is part of the Thames River Basin. Access to the site is available from US Route 20.

== Description ==
The project consists of a rolled earth fill dam with stone slope protection 520 feet (160 m) long and 55 feet (17 m) high. Cut in rock, the spillway comprises a concrete weir 75 ft (23 m) in length. The weir's crest elevation is 19.2 feet (7.0 m) lower than the top of the dam. The permanent lake at East Brimfield Dam, East Brimfield Reservoir (which includes Long Pond, a natural body of water that was enlarged by the dam's pool) is 360 acres (1.5 km^{2}) in size. Also located on the project are numerous natural bodies of water that are not affected by the dam under normal conditions, but are raised and inundated when the reservoir is filled for flood control. These include the 65-acre (260,000 m^{2}) Lake Siog, and the 15-acre (61,000 m^{2}) Lost Lake. The flood storage area for the entire project covers about 2,270 acres (9.2 km^{2}) in the towns of Sturbridge, Brimfield, and Holland, Massachusetts. The entire project, including all associated lands, covers 2,070 acres (8.4 km^{2}). The East Brimfield Dam can store up to 29,900 acre-feet (36,900,000 m^{3}) of water, equivalent to 9.7 billion (thousand million) gallons, for flood control purposes. This is equivalent to 8.3 inches (210 mm) of water runoff from its drainage area of 67.5 square miles (175 km^{2}).

== Recreation ==
There are many areas and facilities for recreation at the East Brimfield Lake project.

=== Day Use Recreation Areas ===
Lake Siog Recreation Area is located at the southern end of the project on Dug Hill Road in the town of Holland. It offers a shaded picnic area, freshwater swimming beach, and 3/4 mile nature trail. This recreation area is open seasonally (1st weekend in June - Labor Day) on Fridays, Saturdays, and Sundays from 10am-6pm. There is no entrance fee.

East Brimfield Damsite is located on Riverview Avenue in the town of Sturbridge. Here, visitors can walk along the top of the dam, or walk the 3/4 mile self-guided nature trail. Open year-round, sunrise to sunset. No entrance fee.

Quinebaug River Canoe trail is a 5-mile (8.0 km) flatwater canoe route along the Quinebaug River from the outlet of Lake Siog to East Brimfield Reservoir. The upstream-end canoe launching point is on Pond Bridge Road in the town of Holland. The downstream-end launching point is at the East Brimfield Reservoir boat ramp on US Route 20 in the town of Brimfield. Three "rest stops" are located along the way with benches for a quick rest. Overnight camping is prohibited. This is a designated National Recreational Trail and Watchable wildlife Area. No fee for use.

Champeaux Road Fishing Area is a handicapped accessible fishing area near the northern end of the reservoir, along Champeaux Road in the town of Sturbridge. Facilities include a parking area, and two accessible fishing platforms on the shoreline of Long Pond. No fee for use.

=== Boat Ramps ===
Long Pond Boat Ramp is located on the north side of US Route 20 in the town of Sturbridge. Paved area with portable toilet and information kiosk. Open in winter for ice fishing access. No fee.

Reservoir Boat Ramp is located on the south side of US Route 20 in the town of Brimfield. Paved area with information kiosk. Closed in winter. No fee.

Holland Pond Boat Launch is located on Pond Bridge Road in the town of Holland. Unpaved area with information kiosk. Recommended for car-top launching only. No fee.
