= Westville Dam =

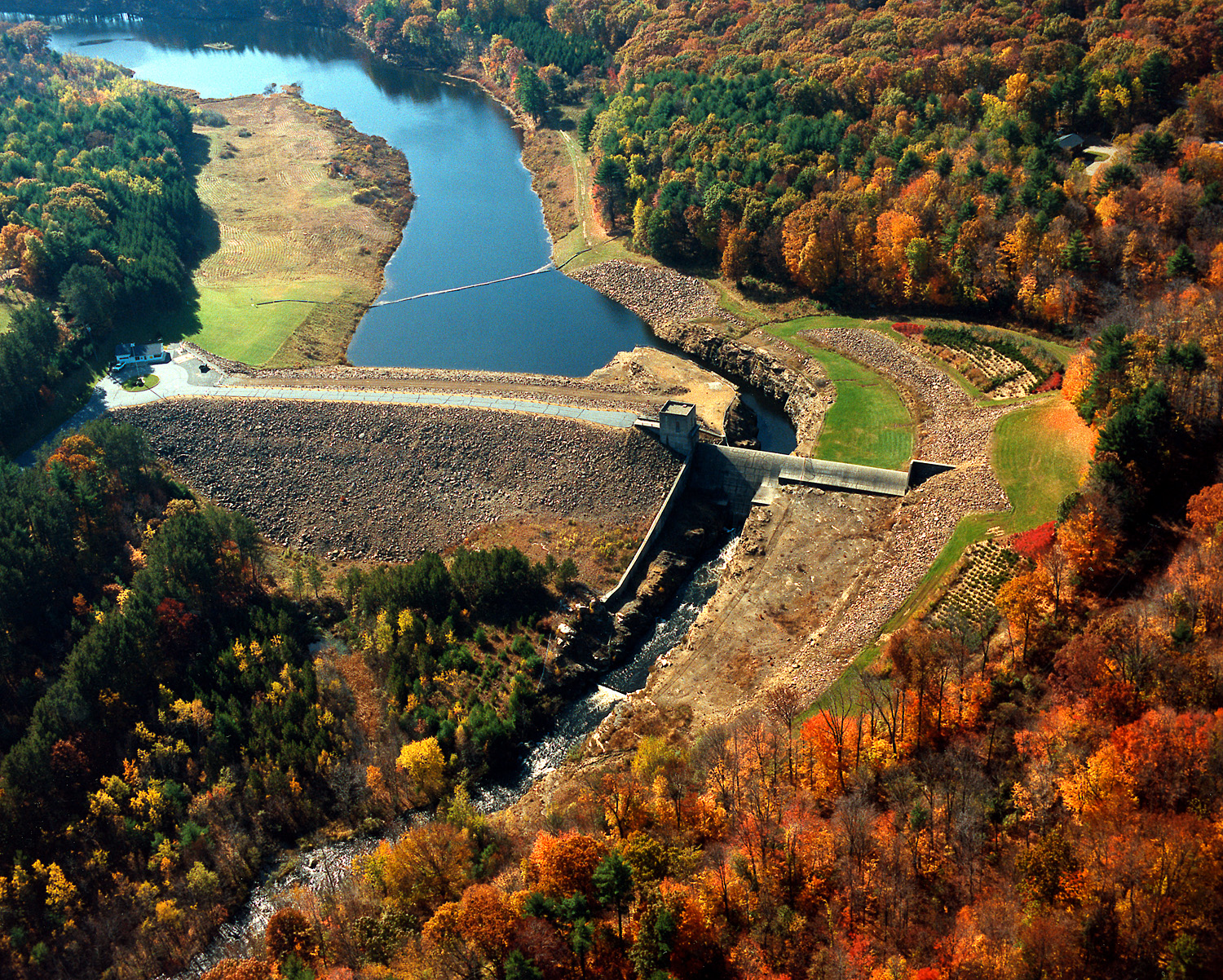
- Westville Lake and Dam
- Interactive map of Westville Dam
- Official name: Westville Dam
- Location: Southbridge and Sturbridge, Massachusetts
- Coordinates: 42°04′54″N 72°03′28″W
- Construction began: June 1960
- Opening date: August 1962
- Operator: Army Corps of Engineers

Dam and spillways
- Impounds: Quinebaug River
- Height: 78 ft (24 m)
- Length: 560 ft (170 m)
- Width (crest): 25 ft (7.6 m)

Reservoir
- Creates: Westville Lake

The Westville Dam is located on the Quinebaug River between Southbridge and Sturbridge, about 1.3 miles (2.1 km) west of the Southbridge town center and 18 miles (29 km) southwest of Worcester, Massachusetts.

Designed and constructed by the United States Army Corps of Engineers, this dam substantially reduces flooding along the Quinebaug and Thames rivers. Construction of the project began in June 1960 with completion in August 1962 at a cost of US$5.6 million.

The Westville reservoir is located within the Quinebaug River Watershed and is part of the Thames River Basin. Access to the site is available from Interstate 84 and State Route 131.

== Description ==
Westville Dam bridge
- Coordinates: 42°04′54″N 72°03′28″W
- Carries: Dam service road / Westville Community trail

Characteristics
- Width: One lane
- Clearance above: Unrestricted

Statistics
- Daily traffic: < 10 vehicles

Location
- Interactive map of Westville Dam bridge

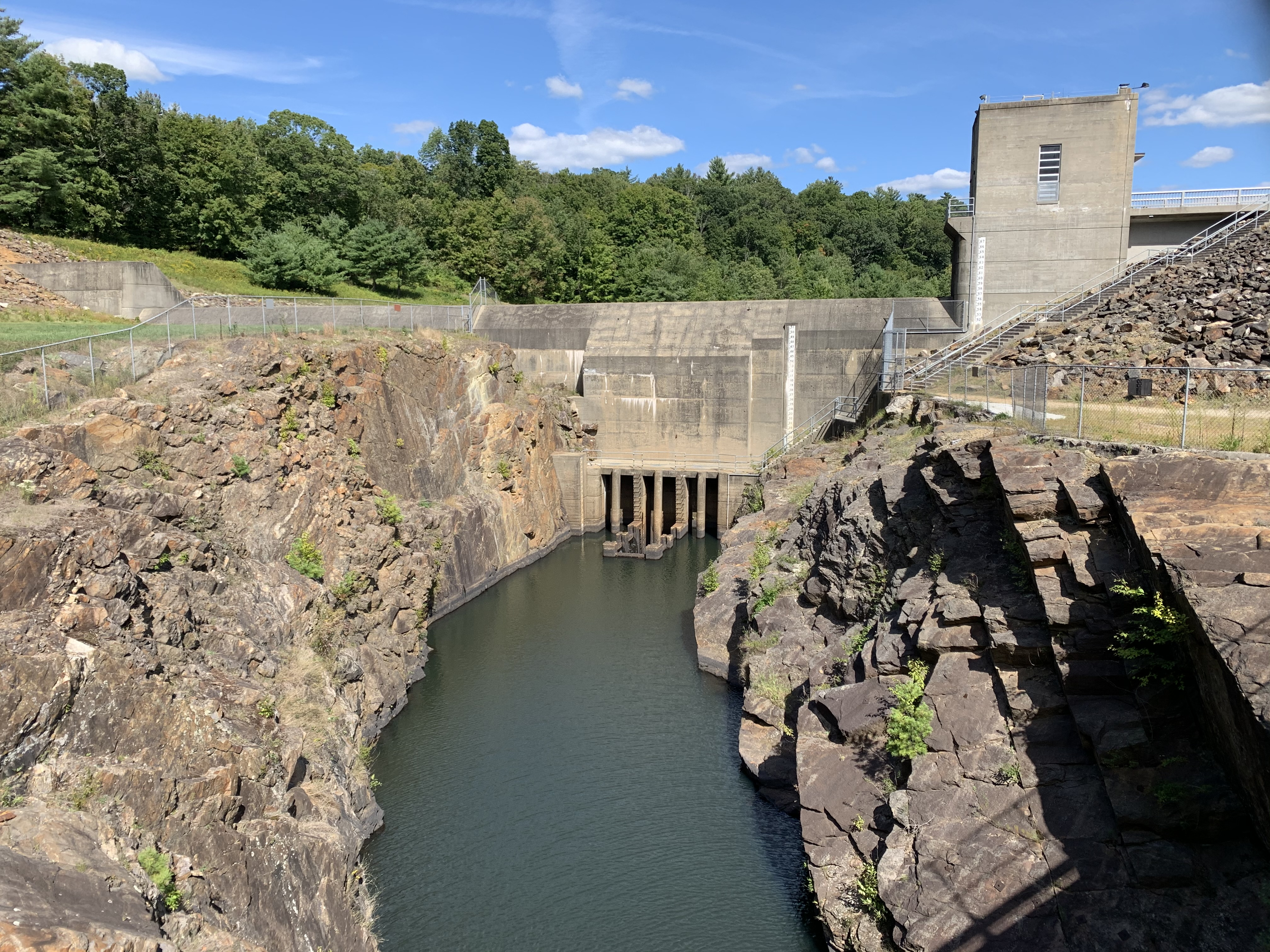
View of the Westville Dam

The project consists of an earth fill dam with stone slope protection 560 feet (170 m) long and 78 feet (24 m) high. Located over the outlet channel, the spillway comprises a concrete weir 200 ft (61 m) in length. The weir's crest elevation is 15 feet (4.6 m) lower than the top of the dam. The dam creates a permanent lake 23 acres (93,000 m^{2}) in size with a maximum depth of 16 ft (4.9 m) The flood storage area for the project covers about 913 acres (3.69 km^{2}) in the towns of Southbridge and Sturbridge, Massachusetts. The entire project, including all associated lands, covers 510 acres (2.1 km^{2}). The Westville Dam can store up to 3.61 billion US gallons (13,700,000 m^{3}) of water for flood control purposes. This is equivalent to 6.5 inches (170 mm) of water covering its drainage area of 32 square miles (83 km^{2}).

== Recreation Areas ==
There is a large picnic/recreation area, with two reserveable picnic shelters located near the south end of the lake. The entrance is on Wallace Road in Sturbridge, near the Quinebaug river bridge. A boat ramp is also located in the recreation area. Camping and swimming are not permitted. There is no entrance fee. The recreation area is open daily during the summer season (3rd Saturday in May to the 2nd Sunday in September) from 8am to 8pm.

A 1.8-mile (2.9 km) loop trail, known as the Westville Lake Community trail, circles the lake. It is open to all non-motorized use. It can be accessed from the recreation area, the damsite parking lot, and the Wallace Road trailhead.

The Heritage trail, a walking trail, starts at the damsite and heads north along the river to nearby West Street School.

The Grand Trunk Trail, which follows the grade of the never completed Southern New England Railway, leads 1.1 miles (1.8 km) from the recreation area to River Road in Sturbridge. The western half of the Community Trail loop follows this railbed as well. The trails, including the damsite and Wallace Road parking areas, are open year-round from sunrise to sunset.

A canoe launching area and fishing area is located along Old Mashapaug Road west of the recreation area. Canoeists can paddle up the Quinebaug River as far as Turner's Club Field in the village of Fiskdale, approx. 5 miles (8.0 km) upstream. Old Mashapaug Road is open to vehicles during daylight hours from the opening of fishing season in April to the Sunday after Labor Day.

A 3/4 mile trail is also available in the Hobbs Brook area of the project, with a trailhead off Hall Road in Sturbridge.
