= Nipmuck State Forest =

Forest in Connecticut, United States

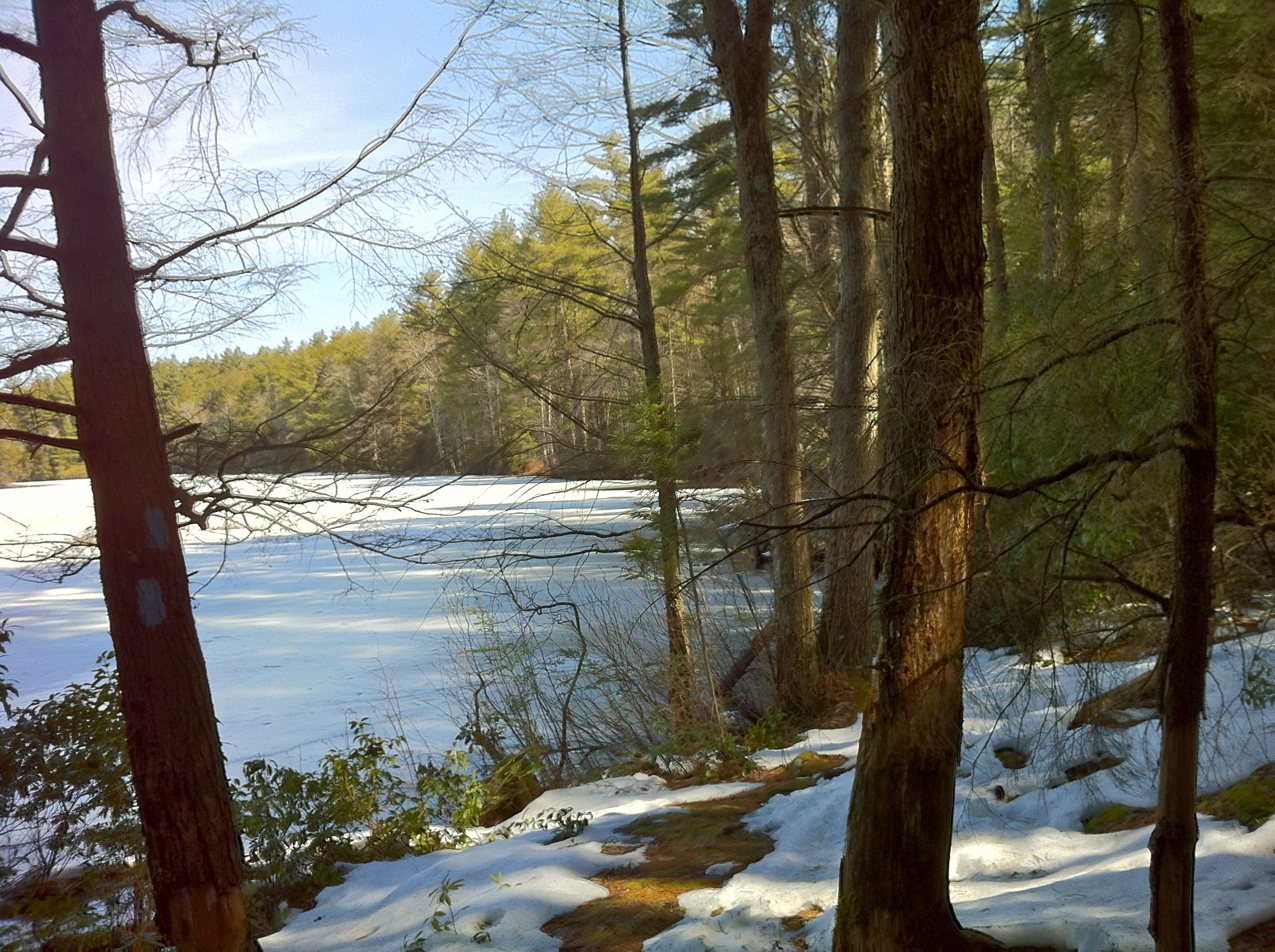

- Location within Connecticut Location within the United States
- Location: Union, Stafford, Ashford, Willington, and Woodstock, Connecticut, United States
- Coordinates: 42°00′51″N 72°10′25″W
- Area: 9,546 acres (3,863 ha)
- Elevation: 945 ft (288 m)
- Established: 1905
- Administrator: Connecticut Department of Energy and Environmental Protection
- Website: Official website

Nipmuck State Forest is a Connecticut state forest. Its 9,000 acres (3,600 ha) surround Bigelow Hollow State Park in the town of Union and include parcels in Stafford, Ashford, and other towns. The forest is part of a larger network of forest lands making up some 40,000 acres (16,000 ha) in all.

== Recreation opportunities ==
Hiking is available on more than 30 miles (48 km) of trails. One of the most popular routes is up to and around Breakneck Pond. Other trails are available in other parcels of the forest. Snowmobiling trails are offered in winter. Fishing is popular both in summer and winter (ice fishing). The streams, ponds and lakes feature stocked as well as native trout, small and large mouth bass, and pickerel. Camping is allowed in the back country of the forest.

== Mountain Laurel Sanctuary ==
In the western portion of the forest, a Mountain Laurel Sanctuary is located on Snow Hill. Mountain laurel thrives here and reaches heights of 15 to 20 feet which is rare for the species.

== See also ==
- Last Green Valley National Heritage Corridor
