= Quinebaug River =

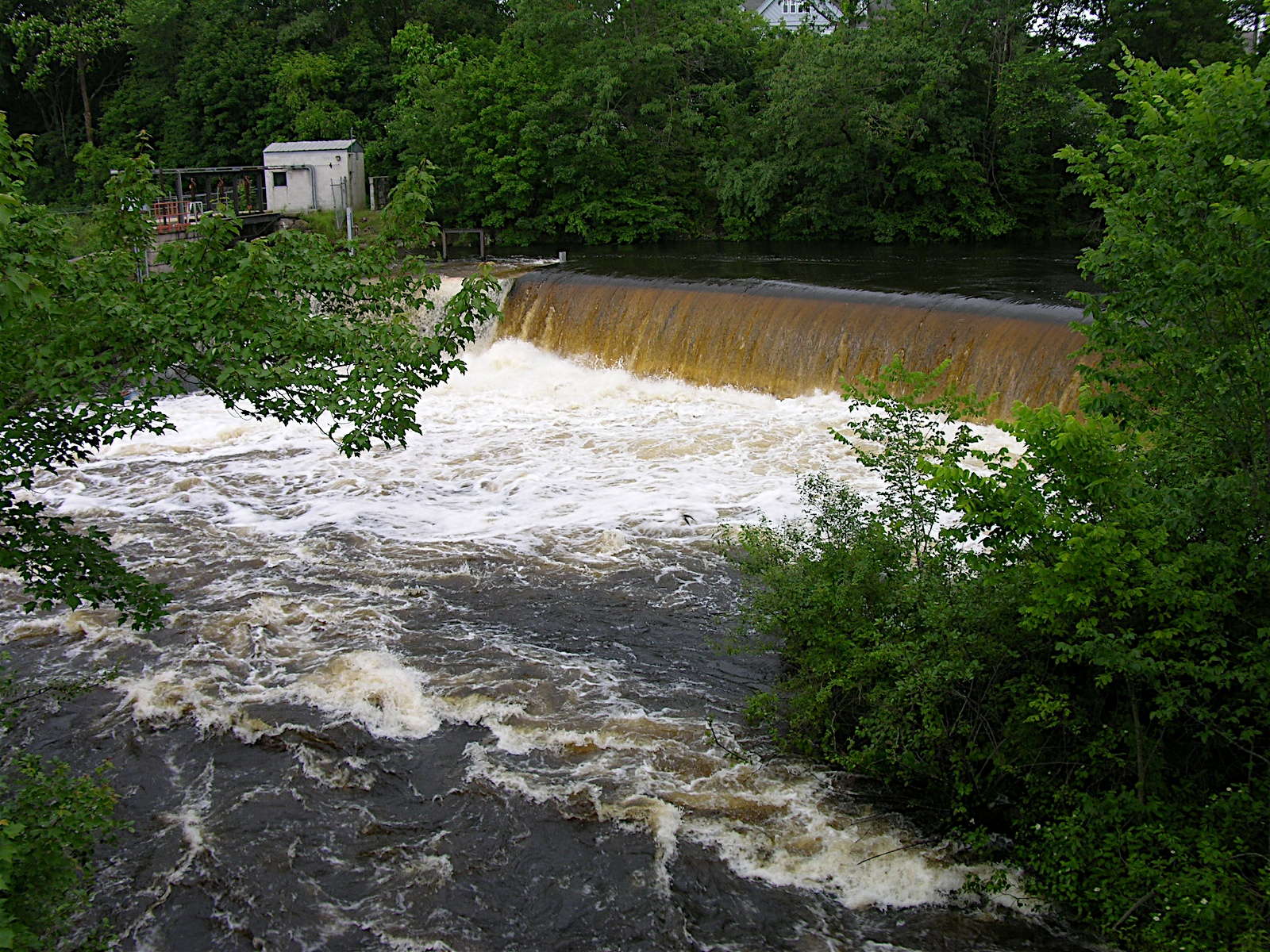

Location
- Country: United States
- State: Connecticut, Massachusetts
- Counties: New London, CT, Windham, CT, Worcester, MA, Hampden, MA

Physical characteristics
- Source: Holland Pond 42.082071°N 72.163666°W
  - location: Holland, Hampden County, Massachusetts, United States
  - elevation: 645 ft (197 m)
- Mouth: Empties into Shetucket River 41.556°N 72.046°W
  - location: Preston and Lisbon, New London County, Connecticut, United States
  - elevation: 30 ft (9.1 m)
- Discharge
  - location: Jewett City, CT
  - average: 467 cu ft/s (13.2 m^{3}/s)Average, 1920-2009
  - minimum: 40 cu ft/s (1.1 m^{3}/s)Annual mean, 1931
  - maximum: 2,640 cu ft/s (75 m^{3}/s)Annual mean, 1938

Basin features
- Tributaries
  - left: French River

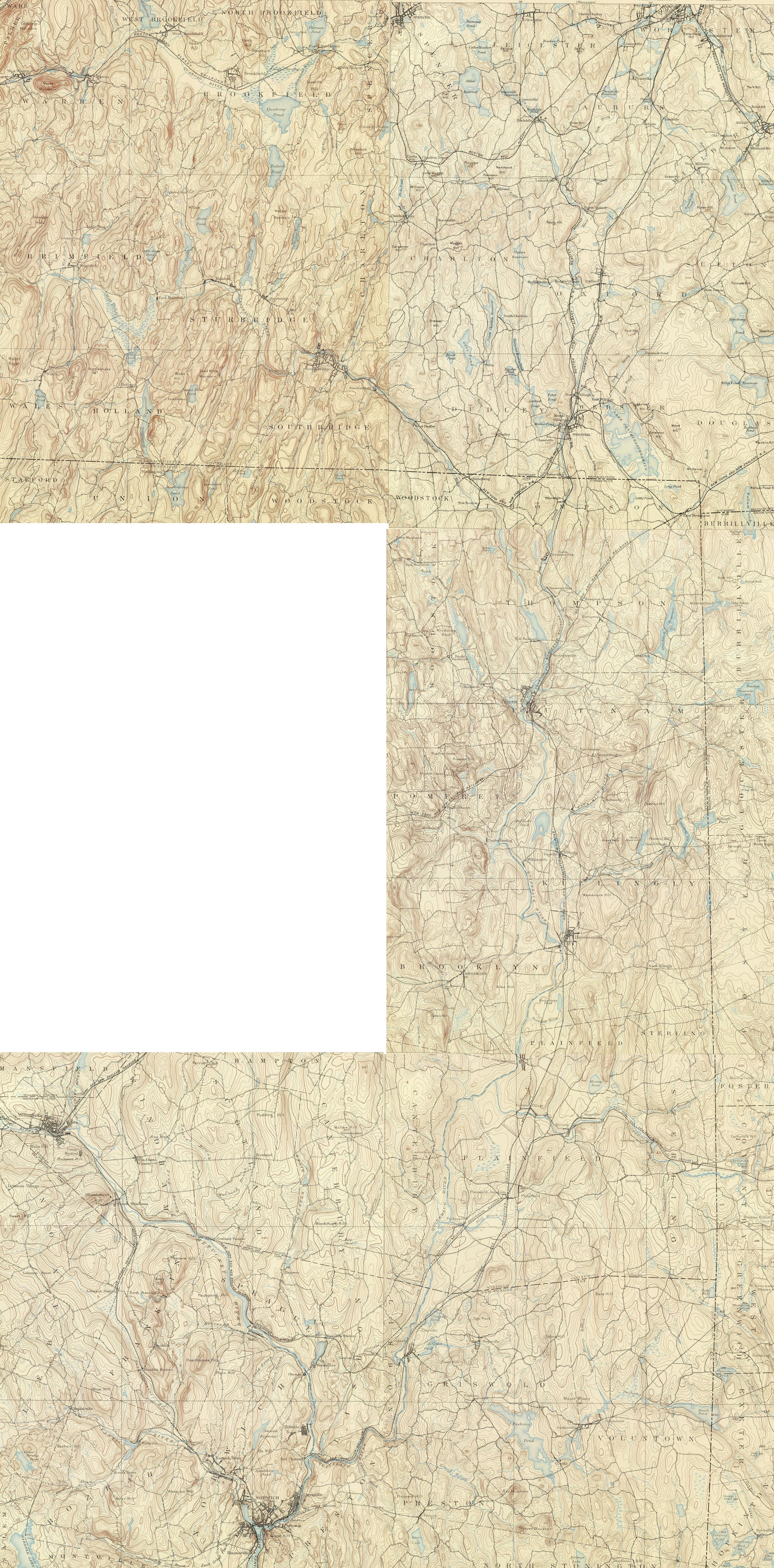
Quinebaug River and environs

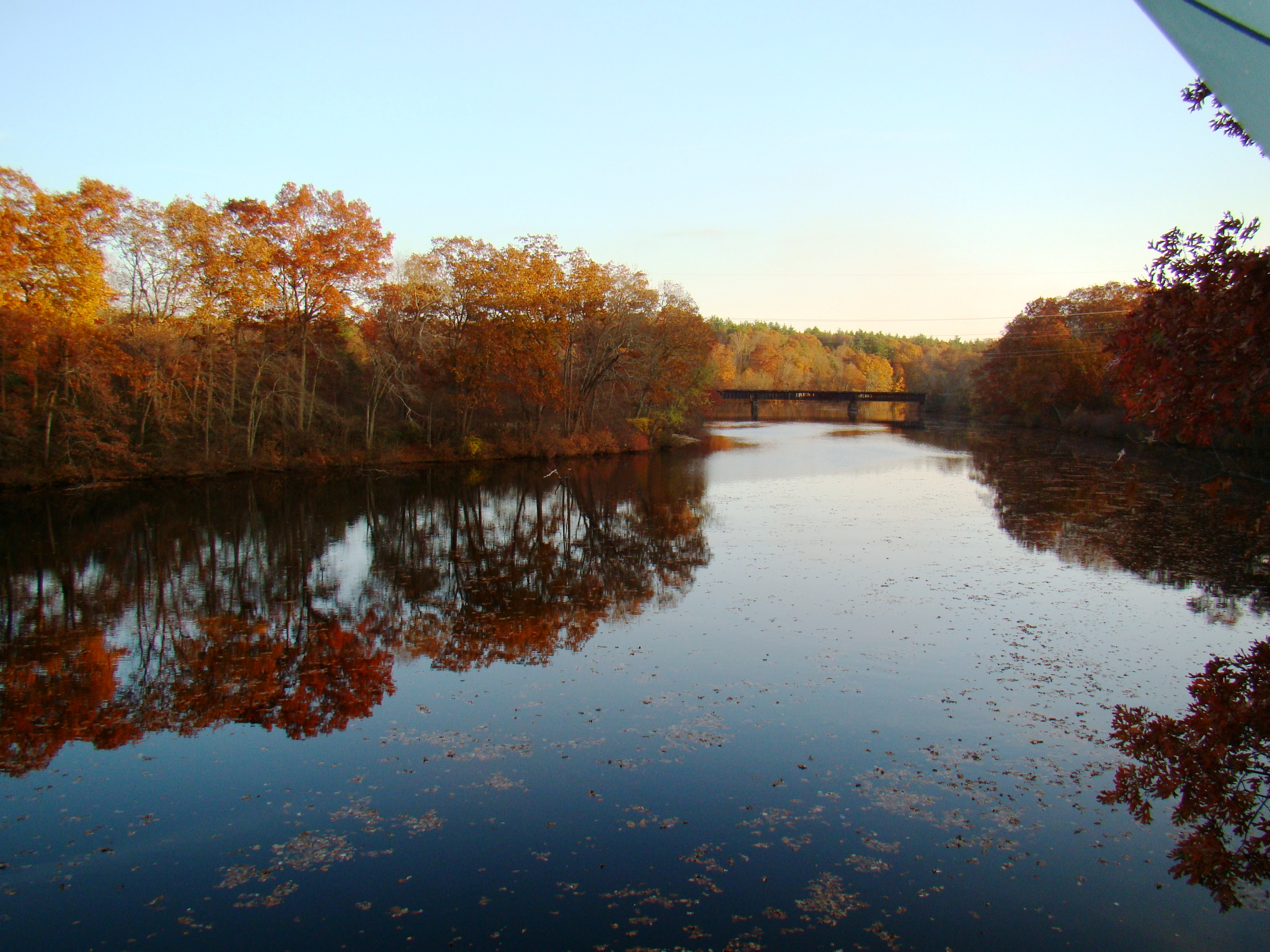
Quinebaug River in Canterbury, CT

The Quinebaug River (/ˈkwɪnəbɔːɡ/ KWIH-nə-bawg) is a river in south-central Massachusetts and eastern Connecticut, with watershed extending into western Rhode Island. The name "Quinebaug" comes from the southern New England Native American term, spelled variously Qunnubbâgge, Quinibauge, etc., meaning "long pond", from qunni-, "long", and -paug, "pond". The river is one of the namesake rivers in the Quinebaug and Shetucket Rivers Valley National Heritage Corridor.

== Course ==
The river is about 69 miles (111 km) in length. It originates from East Brimfield Lake and ponds northwest of Sturbridge, Massachusetts, flows generally southeast and south through Connecticut (Putnam, Danielson, Plainfield, Canterbury and Jewett City), the river joins Aspinook pond which begins in Canterbury and ends in Jewett City. The river then continues to the Shetucket River northeast of Norwich. That river flows from there into the Thames River and drains into the Long Island Sound. It is dammed in its upper reaches at East Brimfield Dam, Westville Dam, and West Thompson Lake -- all for flood control -- and has as well numerous mill dams, which powered mills along the river's course. Some of these still provide hydroelectric power today.

== Watershed ==
The Quinebaug River watershed covers 850 square miles (2,200 km^{2}), and extends into western Rhode Island. It is heavily forested with 29 named streams including six major tributaries (the French, Moosup and Five Mile Rivers, and the Wales, Mill and Cady brooks). The watershed also contains 54 lakes and ponds, 31 of which with an area of 10 acres (40,000 m^{2}) or more, for a total of about 3,000 acres (12 km^{2}; 5 sq mi); the largest is East Brimfield Reservoir in Brimfield and Sturbridge, 420 acres (1.7 km^{2}) in area. The watershed is home to fish species including trout, smallmouth bass, largemouth bass, northern pike, and panfish. Elevations range from 1,264 feet (385 m) above sea level on Mount Pisgah in Wales, Massachusetts, to about 25 ft (7.6 m) in Norwich, Connecticut.

== Crossings ==
State	County	Town	Carries	Built
CT	New London	Lisbon and Griswold	Providence and Worcester Railroad	
CT	New London	Lisbon and Griswold	I-395 (Connecticut Turnpike)	1956
CT	New London	Lisbon and Griswold	Route 12/Route 138	
CT	New London	Lisbon and Griswold	Silvandale Road crossing (abandoned)	
CT	Windham	Canterbury	Providence and Worcester Railroad	
CT	Windham	Canterbury	Butts Bridge Road	
CT	Windham	Canterbury and Plainfield	Route 14	
CT	Windham	Brooklyn and Plainfield	Route 205	
CT	Windham	Brooklyn and Killingly	US 6	
CT	Windham	Pomfret and Killingly	Route 101	
CT	Windham	Pomfret and Killingly	Cotton Bridge Road	
CT	Windham	Putnam	Landfill access bridge (private)	1999
CT	Windham	Putnam	Technology Park Drive	2015
CT	Windham	Putnam	Airline Rail Trail	
CT	Windham	Putnam	US 44	1925
CT	Windham	Putnam	Bridge Street	1958
CT	Windham	Putnam	Route 171	1988
CT	Windham	Thompson	West Thompson Road	1964
CT	Windham	Thompson	Blain Road (bridge removed)	
CT	Windham	Thompson	Red Bridge Road	1964
CT	Windham	Thompson	Brickyard Road	1964
CT	Windham	Thompson	Fabyan Road	1999
CT	Windham	Thompson	Route 197	
MA	Worcester	Dudley	Route 131	
MA	Worcester	Dudley	Southbridge Branch RR (abandoned)	
MA	Worcester	Dudley	West Dudley Road	
MA	Worcester	Southbridge	East Main Street	
MA	Worcester	Southbridge	AO Factory Road (private)	
MA	Worcester	Southbridge	AO Factory Pedestrian Bridge (private)	
MA	Worcester	Southbridge	AO Factory Pedestrian Bridge (private)	
MA	Worcester	Southbridge	AO Factory Pedestrian Bridge (private)	
MA	Worcester	Southbridge	Pipeline crossing	
MA	Worcester	Southbridge	Business Park Road (Private)	
MA	Worcester	Southbridge	Route 169	1956
MA	Worcester	Southbridge	Central Street	
MA	Worcester	Southbridge	River Street	
MA	Worcester	Southbridge	Mill Street	1956
MA	Worcester	Southbridge	Route 131	
MA	Worcester	Sturbridge and Southbridge	Westville Dam service road	2003
MA	Worcester	Sturbridge and Southbridge	Breakneck Road/Wallace Road	1956
MA	Worcester	Sturbridge	Old Mashapaug Road	1956
MA	Worcester	Sturbridge	Grand Trunk Rail Trail	2002
MA	Worcester	Sturbridge	Farquhar Road	1939
MA	Worcester	Sturbridge	Haynes Street	1961
MA	Worcester	Sturbridge	I-84	1971
MA	Worcester	Sturbridge	Old Sturbridge Village Road	1972
MA	Worcester	Sturbridge	OSV Pedestrian Bridge (Private)	
MA	Worcester	Sturbridge	OSV Covered Bridge (Private)	
MA	Worcester	Sturbridge	Stallion Hill Road	1956
MA	Worcester	Sturbridge	Holland Road	1956
MA	Hampden	Brimfield	Holland-East Brimfield Road	1958
MA	Hampden	Holland	Morse Road (closed)	1939
MA	Hampden	Holland	Pond Bridge Road	1934

== Paddling the river ==
Three sections of the Quinebaug River have been designated National Recreation Trails by the National Park Service, some of the first water trails to receive this designation. The sections are: Holland Pond to East Brimfield Reservoir (in Holland and Brimfield, Massachusetts), Paper Mill Dam in Dudley to West Thompson Lake, and Simonzi Park in Putnam to Aspinook Pond in Canterbury. The East Coast Greenway runs along the river in some spots.

Canoe/kayak launch sites are located at the following locations:

- Pond Bridge Road, Holland
- US Route 20 boat ramp, Brimfield
- Old Mashapaug Road, Sturbridge
- West Dudley Road, Dudley
- Fabyan Road, Thompson
- West Thompson Lake boat ramp, Thompson
- Simonzi Park on Kennedy Drive, Putnam
- Route 101, Pomfret
- Riverside Park off Day Street, Brooklyn
- Town Park off Route 12, Killingly
- Quinebaug Trout Hatchery, Plainfield
- Robert Manship Park off Route 14, Canterbury
- Butts Bridge Road, Canterbury

== Gallery ==
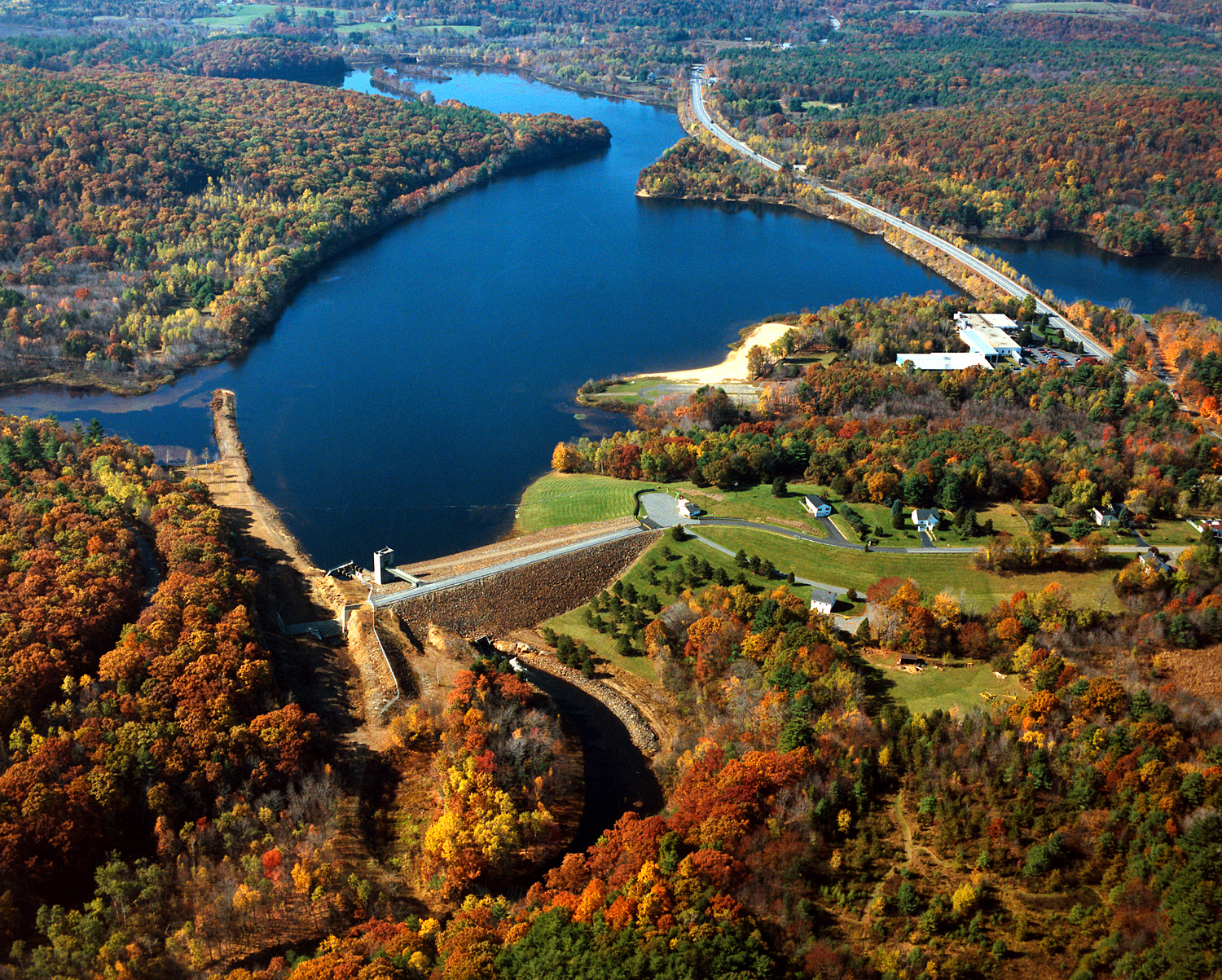
Brimfield Lake and Dam on the Quinebaug River in Hampden County, Massachusetts

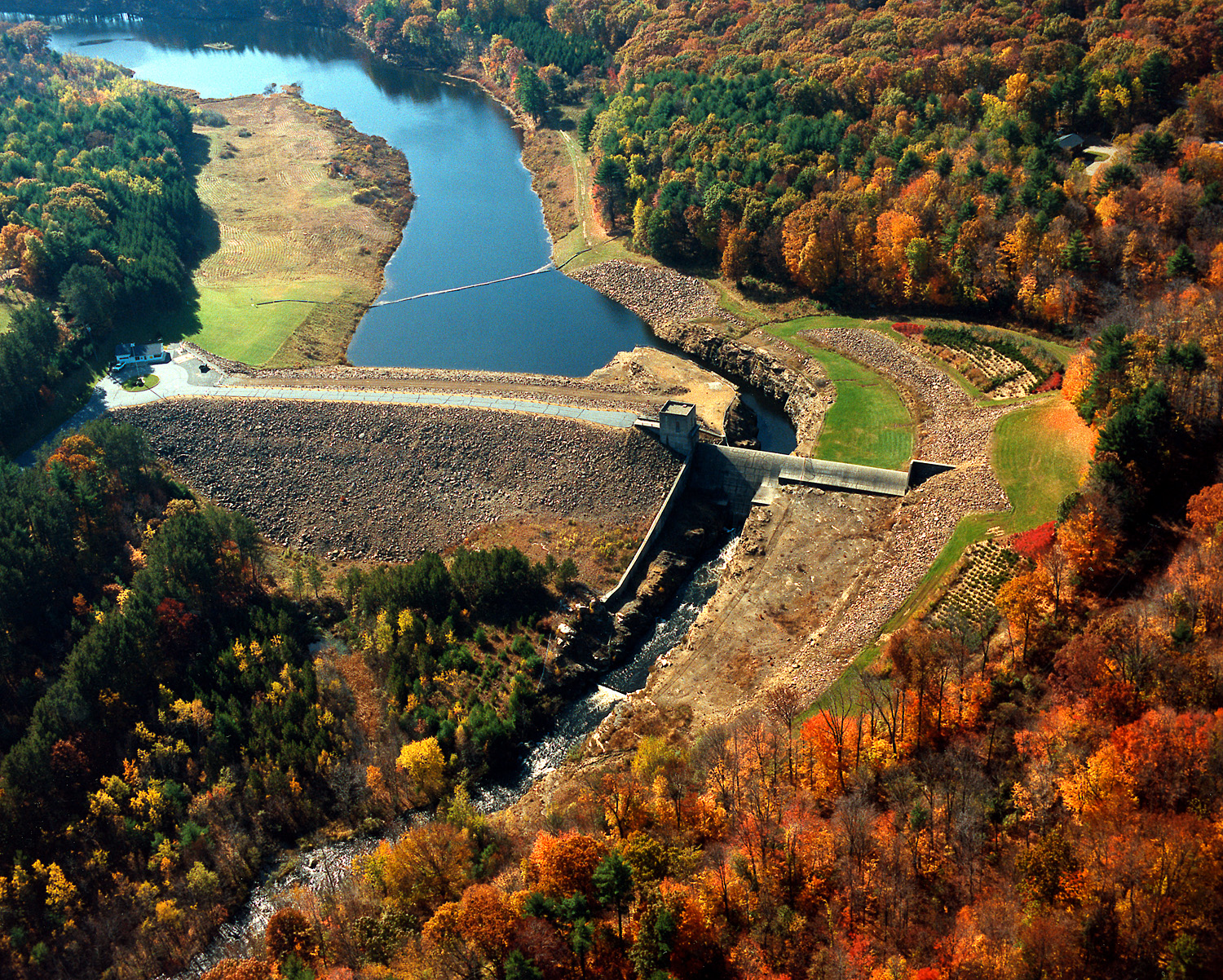
Westville Lake and Dam on the Quinebaug River in Worcester County, Massachusetts

== See also ==
- List of rivers of Connecticut
- List of rivers of Massachusetts
