= Union, Connecticut =

- Town
- Town of Union
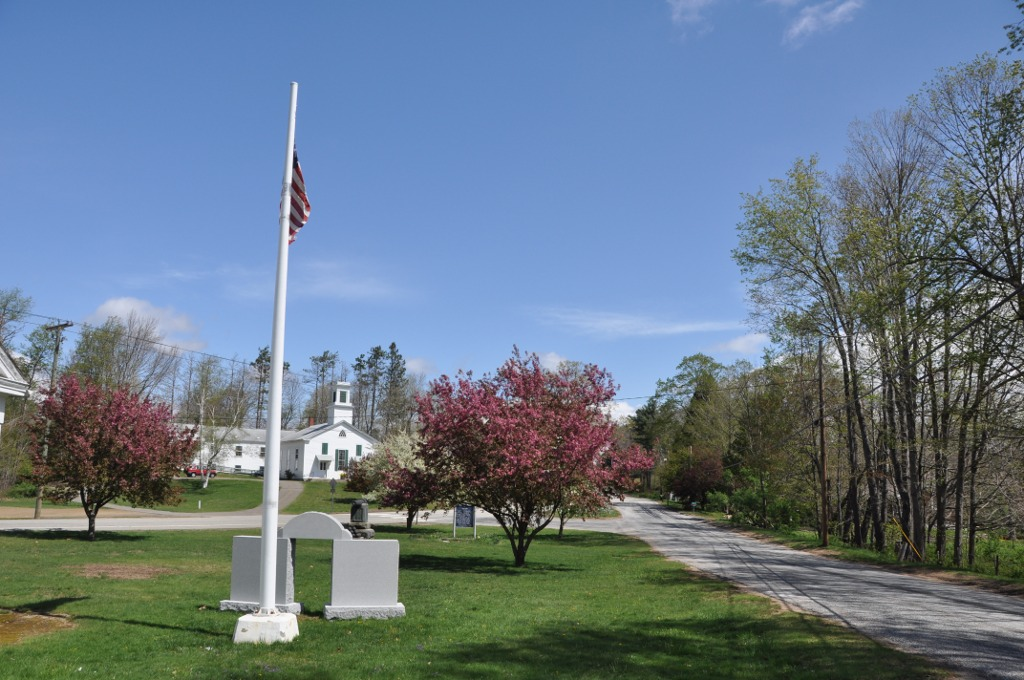
- The town green

- Seal

- Coordinates: 41°59′17″N 72°09′41″W
- Country: United States
- U.S. state: Connecticut
- County: Tolland
- Region: Northeastern CT
- Incorporated: 1734

Government
  - Type: Selectman-town meeting
  - First selectman: David D. Eaton (R)
  - Selectman: Mary Huda (R)
  - Selectman: David Heck (D)
  - State Senator: Dan Champaigne (R-35th District)
  - State Rep.: Pat Boyd (D-50th District)

Area
  - Total: 29.8 sq mi (77.2 km^{2})
  - Land: 28.7 sq mi (74.3 km^{2})
  - Water: 1.1 sq mi (2.9 km^{2})
- Elevation: 981 ft (299 m)

Population (2020)
  - Total: 785
  - Density: 27/sq mi (10.6/km^{2})
- Time zone: UTC−5 (Eastern)
  - Summer (DST): UTC−4 (Eastern)
- ZIP Codes: 06076 (Stafford Springs) and 06242 (Eastford)
- Area codes: 860/959
- FIPS code: 09-77830
- GNIS feature ID: 0213519
- Website: www.unionconnecticut.org

Union is a town located in the northeastern part of Tolland County, Connecticut, United States and is part of the Northeastern Connecticut Planning Region and Last Green Valley National Heritage Corridor. The population was 785 at the 2020 census, making it the least populous town and municipality in Connecticut. Union includes the village of Mashapaug located in the Eastern Uplands at the Massachusetts state line. Union is located 33 miles (53 kilometers) northeast of the state capital, Hartford and 67 mi (108 km) southwest of Boston, as well as 153 mi (246 km) northeast of New York City.

== History ==
The first European Settlement in Union was in 1727, making Union the last Connecticut town east of the Connecticut River to be settled. The first settler was James McNall of Ireland. He was closely followed by his brother William. The town was incorporated in October 1734. The name Union designates "union of lands".

Union was first a town in Windham County. It became a town in Tolland County upon its formation from part of Windham County on October 13, 1785.

There were 500 people in the town in 1756. The population grew to 767 by 1800, but declined thereafter. There were just 431 people in Union in 1890. The official population of the town is still less than 1,000 residents today.

== Civic associations ==
Union is home to Venturing Crew 83 of the Connecticut Rivers Council. They are a member of the Nipmuck District and chartered by the Union Volunteer Fire Department.

== Geography ==
According to the United States Census Bureau, the town has a total area of 29.8 square miles (77 km^{2}), of which 28.7 square miles (74 km^{2}) is land and 1.1 square miles (2.8 km^{2}) (3.75%) is water.

Union has the highest town center in eastern Connecticut at 1,015 feet (309 m) and the 4th highest in the state. The highest elevation in eastern Connecticut is 1,315 feet (401 m) Burley Hill in the northwestern part of town. In addition, I-84 reaches its highest elevation in Connecticut (1,002 feet (305 m)) in Union.

Approximately one-third of the town is state park land, including Bigelow Hollow State Park, Nipmuck State Forest and the Mountain Laurel Sanctuary. A portion of the Yale-Myers Forest and Hull Foresters are located in Union. All combined, there are nearly 34,000 acres of forestland in Union.

Mashapaug Lake is a large lake in Union. The lake is used for fishing, boating, and swimming.

== Demographics ==
Historical population
| Census | Pop. | Note | %± |
|---|---|---|---|
| 1790 | 631 | | — |
| 1800 | 767 | | 21.6% |
| 1810 | 752 | | −2.0% |
| 1820 | 757 | | 0.7% |
| 1830 | 711 | | −6.1% |
| 1840 | 669 | | −5.9% |
| 1850 | 728 | | 8.8% |
| 1860 | 732 | | 0.5% |
| 1870 | 627 | | −14.3% |
| 1880 | 539 | | −14.0% |
| 1890 | 431 | | −20.0% |
| 1900 | 428 | | −0.7% |
| 1910 | 322 | | −24.8% |
| 1920 | 267 | | −17.1% |
| 1930 | 196 | | −26.6% |
| 1940 | 234 | | 19.4% |
| 1950 | 261 | | 11.5% |
| 1960 | 383 | | 46.7% |
| 1970 | 443 | | 15.7% |
| 1980 | 546 | | 23.3% |
| 1990 | 612 | | 12.1% |
| 2000 | 693 | | 13.2% |
| 2010 | 854 | | 23.2% |
| 2020 | 785 | | −8.1% |
U.S. Decennial Census

At the census of 2000, there were 693 people, 285 households, and 200 families residing in the town. The population density was 24.1 people per square mile (9.3 people/km^{2}). There were 332 housing units at an average density of 11.6 per square mile (4.5/km^{2}). The racial makeup of the town was 98.56% White, 0.14% Asian, and 1.30% from two or more races.

There were 285 households, out of which 27.4% had children under the age of 18 living with them, 64.6% were married couples living together, 4.6% had a female householder with no husband present, and 29.5% were non-families. 22.5% of all households were made up of individuals, and 4.9% had someone living alone who was 65 years of age or older. The average household size was 2.43 and the average family size was 2.87.

In the town, the population was spread out, with 21.5% under the age of 18, 3.3% from 18 to 24, 34.6% from 25 to 44, 28.7% from 45 to 64, and 11.8% who were 65 years of age or older. The median age was 40 years. For every 100 females, there were 103.2 males. For every 100 females age 18 and over, there were 103.0 males.

The median income for a household in the town was $58,214, and the median income for a family was $65,417. Males had a median income of $48,021 versus $35,469 for females. The per capita income for the town was $27,900. About 2.0% of families and 3.5% of the population were below the poverty line, including 5.9% of those under age 18 and none of those age 65 or over.

== Education ==
Union residents are zoned to the Union School District for grades Kindergarten through 8. The only school in the district is Union Elementary School.

High schoolers have the option of attending Stafford High School, Rockville Vocational-Agricultural School, Windham Regional Technical Vocational School or Woodstock Academy.

== Tourism ==
=== Recreation ===
With over 40,000 acres of forestland in and around town and a major interstate going through it, Union is known for outdoor recreation such as hunting, fishing, hiking, camping and picnicking. The area's elevation and dominance of evergreen trees makes the area cooler than surrounding places. Most activity is centered on Bigelow Hollow State Park, and especially at Mashapaug Lake.

Snowmobiling is also enjoyed in the area.

=== Landmarks ===
The village of Mashapaug in Union is the site of the Traveler Restaurant, a unique eating establishment that gives away used books to its patrons.

Camp Pomperaug, a Boy Scout camp operated by the Connecticut Yankee Council, BSA, is situated within Union, and borders the state forest. It was originally property of the Wells family, for whom Wells Pond is named. The camp was originally situated on Lake Zoar in Monroe, but was relocated to the Union property when the original camp's dining hall was destroyed by a severe winter storm.

The camp includes old stone foundations of the buildings once comprising Well's Mill, and also includes a small Revolutionary War cemetery where, among other soldiers interred, lies a brother-in-law of Benedict Arnold. The burial site is thought by some to be haunted.

The Union Free Public Library is housed in one of the town's few public buildings. The library was established by a town meeting in November 1894, and opened March 25, 1895, in a private home. In 1912 it moved into a newly built building, which it still occupies.

- Union Green Historic District

== Notable people ==
- Alonzo Horton, considered the second founder of the city of San Diego, California, and the founder of Hortonville, Wisconsin, was born in Union on October 24, 1813. His family moved away from the area in 1815
- Moses G. Leonard (1809–1899), a United States representative from New York, grew up in Union but was born in nearby Stafford
- Ebenezer Stoddard (1785–1847), a United States Representative from Connecticut and Lieutenant Governor of Connecticut, was born in Union
