= Coney Rock =

Granite and gneiss ridge in Connecticut, US

Coney Rocks Preserve
- Location within Connecticut
- Location: Storrs, Connecticut
- Coordinates: 41.798256°N 72.198935°W
- Area: 200 acres (81 ha)
- Established: 2001
- Governing body: Joshua's Trust and the Town of Mansfield

Coney Rock is a 600-foot-tall (180 m), 1,000-foot-long (300 m), glacially formed granite and gneiss ridge in Storrs, Connecticut, part of the town of Mansfield. It is part of the 200-acre Coney Rock Preserve owned partly by the Town and partly by Joshua's Trust that includes the remains of an old farm, a marsh, a hemlock grove, a hornbeam stand, a birch grove, and glacial erratics, as well as five miles of white and yellow blazed trails. There is a memorial bench at the peak. According to local legend, one can see Rhode Island from the ridge. The cliff is stepped.

== Ownership ==
Alfred Oden owned Coney Rock until 1933 when he sold the west half to Knute Olsen and the east to Warren Chapin. Olsen's half was bought by the town in 2001 and is part of the 61-acre Dorwart Family Preserve. In response, David Storrs Chapin, Warren's son, sold his half to Joshua's Trust in 2002, who added 9 acres. In 2009, this was connected to Proposal Rocks by another 5.9 acres.

== History ==
The name Coney Rock is of uncertain origin. It may have been in reference to rabbits, a rodent mistaken for a pika, or somebody's last name. Another theory is that it was originally "Coony," referring to raccoons. Whatever the origin, Coney Rock has been named as such for around three centuries.

There are several stone walls, old pastures, an old road, and a spring left behind from a previous farm.

The ledge was clearcut during the late nineteenth and early twentieth centuries, and legend states that calls would travel from here to Fifty Foot Cliff.

In 2000, there was an accidental fire.

== See also ==
- Fifty Foot Cliff
- Nipmuck Trail
- Joshua's Trust
