= Wolf Rock =

Wolf Rock may refer to:

== Places ==
- Wolf Rock, Connecticut, United States
- Wolf Rock, Cornwall, England
- Wolf Rock, Lord Howe Island, Australia
- Wolf Rock (Queensland), Australia

== Other uses ==
- Wolf Rock!, a 1993 album by Japanese rock band Guitar Wolf
- Wolf Rock TV, a 1984 animated series
