= Fishers Brook (Connecticut) =

River in Connecticut, United States

Coordinates: 41°49′26.3″N 72°13′36.7″W

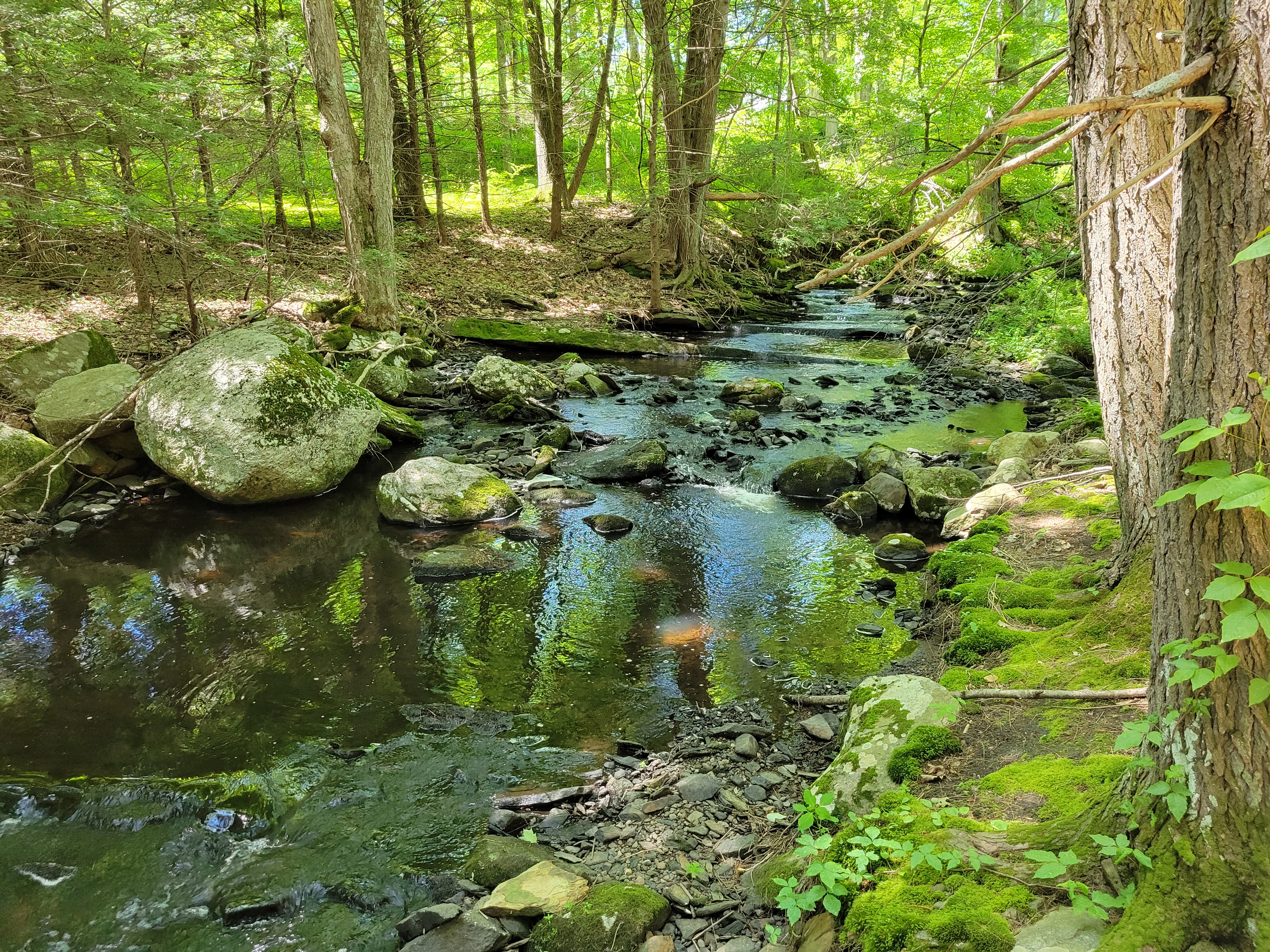
Fishers Brook

Fishers Brook is a stream that runs for about 4,000 meters (13,123 feet) at its maximum length in spring. Most of the year, it reaches only 3,000 meters (9842.52 feet). Located in Storrs, Connecticut, the brook feeds several small wetlands, including one small pond, before dropping off into Codfish Falls. It then leads into the Fenton River. Just before the falls, as well as in several other places, it is intersected by small bridges.

== Flora and fauna ==
Like much of the surrounding bodies of water, Fishers Brook is home to many species of frog, toad, and salamander, as well as newts and mudpuppies. Water snakes and smooth greensnakes are among the most common snakes here, and small turtles can be found sunning themselves on rocks. Many birds and mammals also live along the brook.

Plants that grow in the water here are mostly common water plants, such as pondweed, marshweed, sphagnum moss, waterlily, and cress. Cattails, ferns, reeds, skunk cabbage, and invasive phragmites are found on the shores. Fungi of all sorts are native as well.

== See also ==
- Fenton River
- Codfish Falls
- Nipmuck Trail
- List of rivers of Connecticut
