= Codfish Falls =

Series of waterfalls in Storrs, Connecticut, US

Coordinates: 41°49′26.3″N 72°13′36.7″W

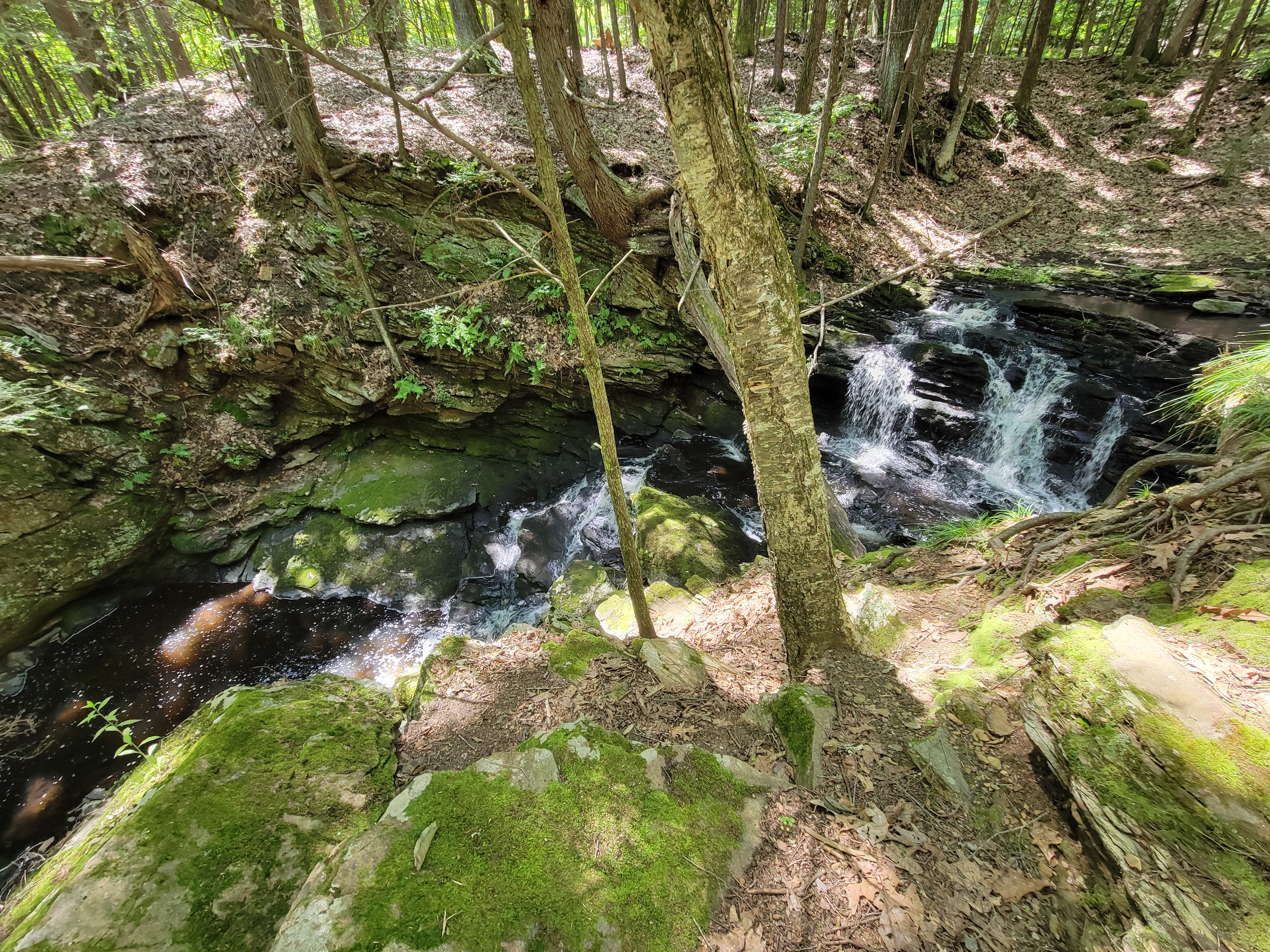
Upper Codfish Falls

Codfish Falls is a series of close-knit plunges and cascades, ending in a fan, that is fed by Fishers Brook, in Storrs, Connecticut (a village in the town of Mansfield). It can be accessed by a trail from a road of the same name. The falls has carved out a steep-sided gorge, averaging twenty feet deep, which is in sharp contrast to the surrounding land. It feeds into the nearby Fenton River.

== See also ==
- Fishers Brook
- Fenton River
- Nipmuck Trail
