= Fifty Foot Cliff =

Cliff in Connecticut, United States

Fifty Foot Cliff Preserve
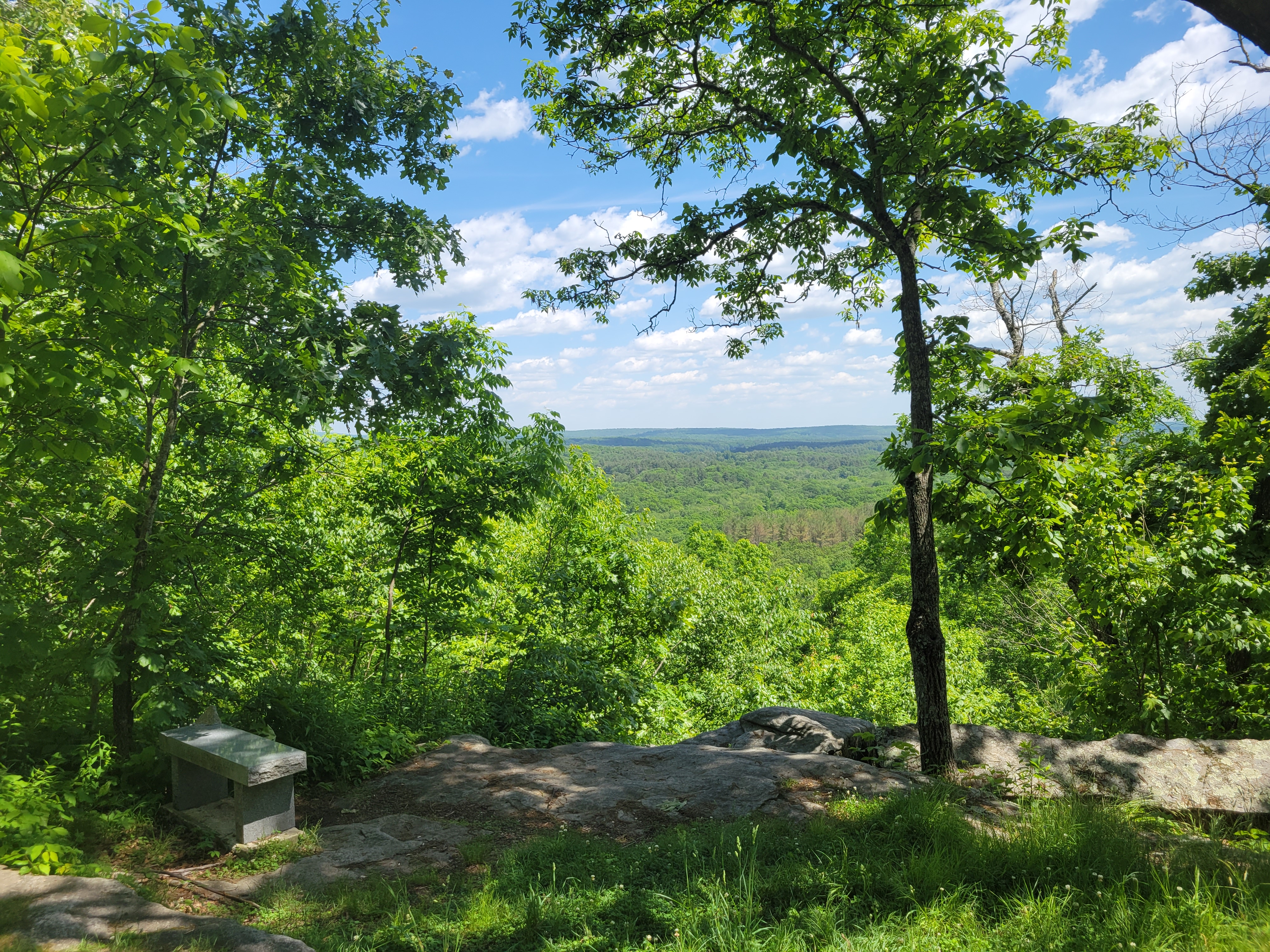
- View from the top of Fifty Foot Cliff

- Location within Connecticut
- Location: Storrs, Connecticut
- Coordinates: 41.790528°N 72.213722°W
- Area: 102 acres (41 ha)
- Governing body: Town of Mansfield, Connecticut

Fifty Foot Cliff is a glacially carved gneiss cliff in Storrs, Mansfield, Connecticut, with views of Eastern Connecticut. It is, in reality, just over one hundred feet tall, named more for alliterative reasons than anything else. At the top of the ledge is a granite bench in memory of filmmaker Ishmael Rosas.

Fifty Foot Cliff is accessed by a trail starting at the Mansfield Historical Society and is part of the Nipmuck Trail. It meets up with several other trails at a cleared space known as "The Junction." Some highlights of the trail include stone walls, cairns, glacial erratics, and a large tree; called the wolf tree, with a rope swing.

The Cliff is part of the town-owned Fifty-Foot Cliff Preserve, 102 acres of mostly forested land with a 1.4 mile trail.

According to legend, when the cliff was devoid of trees in the late nineteenth and early twentieth centuries, calls from the top of the bluff would carry all the way to nearby Coney Rock.

== See also ==
- Nipmuck Trail
