= Proposal Rocks =

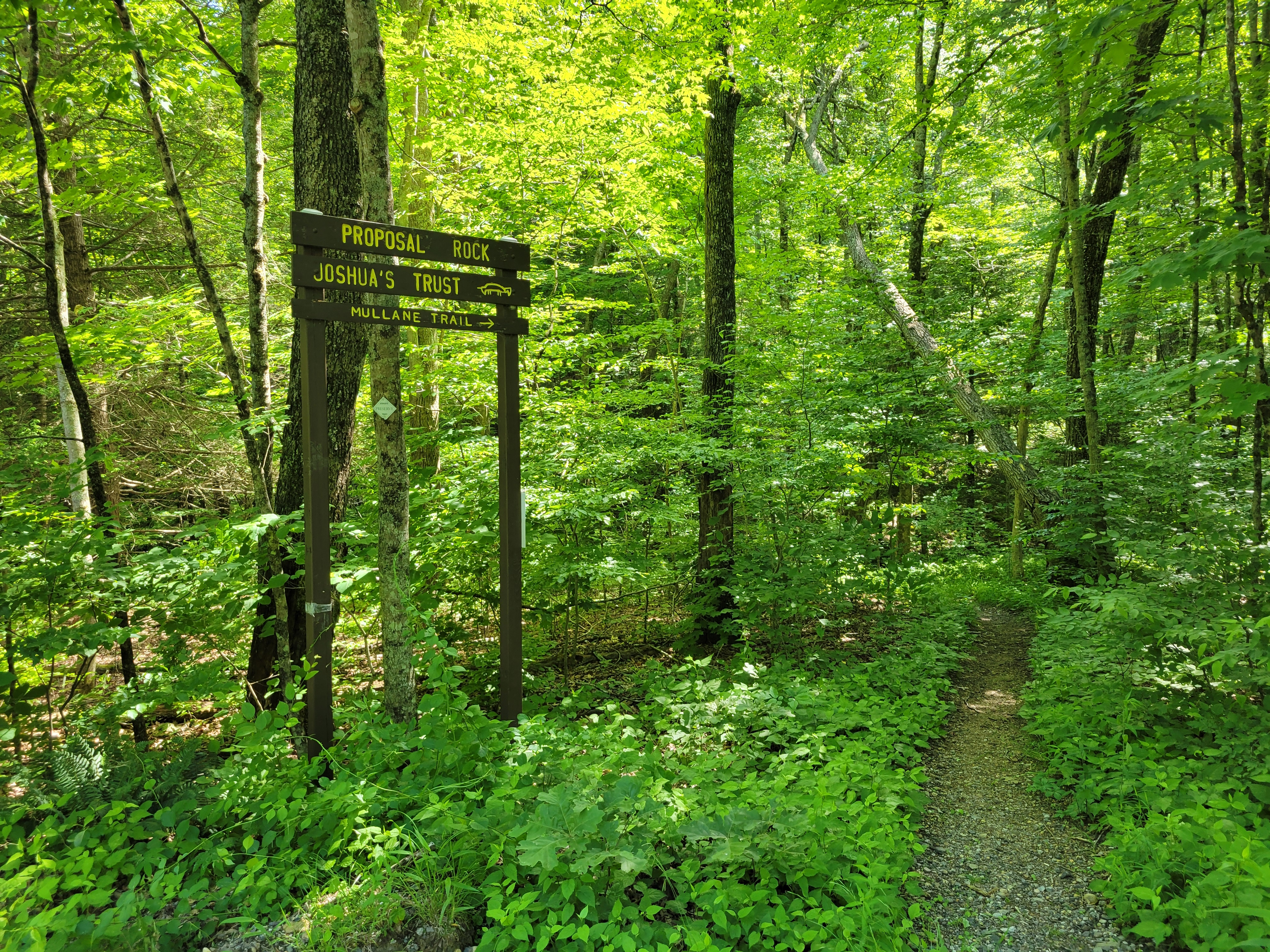
- Proposal Rock sign

- Location within Connecticut
- Location: Storrs, Connecticut
- Coordinates: 41.798924°N 72.192814°W
- Area: 29.9 acres (12.1 ha)
- Established: 2003
- Governing body: Joshua's Trust

Proposal Rocks is the name of a 29.9 acre nature preserve owned by Joshua's Trust in that features a group of granite boulders. It was donated to Joshua's Trust in 2003, and in 2009 was connected to 134-acre Coney Rock preserve by a 5.9 acre space of land.

The site was named Proposal Rocks because the previous owner Leonora Mullane's parents had gotten married in that spot.
