= Wolf Rock, Connecticut =

Wolf Rock Nature Preserve
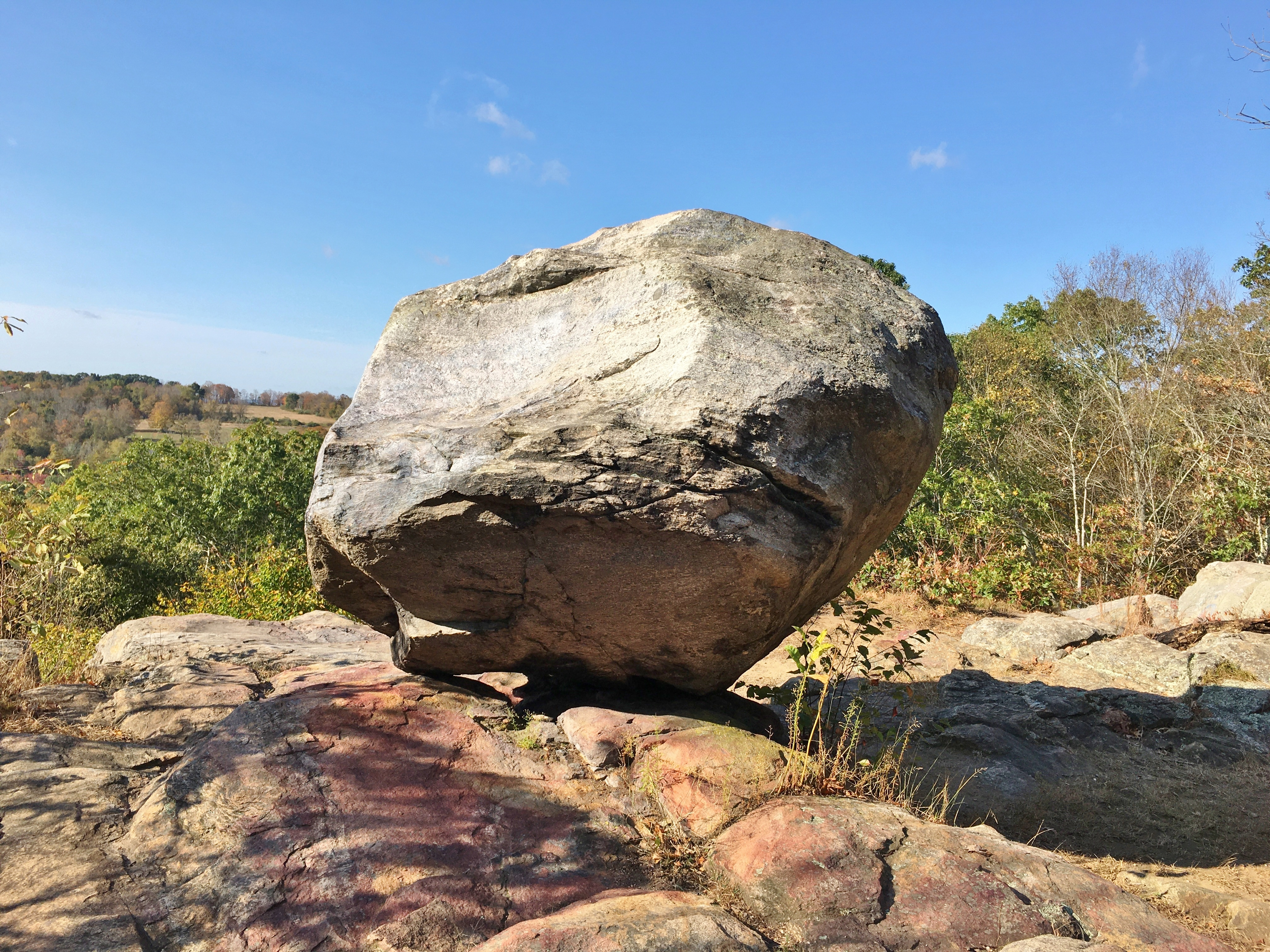
- Wolf Rock

- Location within Connecticut
- Location: Mansfield, Connecticut
- Coordinates: 41.759607°N 72.213017°W
- Area: 108 acres (44 ha)
- Governing body: Joshua's Trust
- Website: joshuastrust.org/wolf-rock-nature-preserve

Wolf Rock, also known as Wolfpit Rocks, Woolfes Rocks, and Wolfe's Rock is the name of a notable gneiss and quartz conglomerate glacial erratic in Mansfield, Connecticut, perched atop a 40-foot cliff. The rock itself is six feet tall and almost round. The surrounding landscape also contains many boulders and crags. The rock was once part of a tower used to view the landscape.

The Wolf Rock Nature Preserve which holds Wolf Rock is 108 acres in total. It is the first acquisition of the Joshua's Trust and includes part of the Nipmuck Trail.

The Wolf Rock Nature Preserve is adjacent to Sawmill Brook Preserve and contains many trails. It is popular with rock climbers. It is mentioned as far back as the eighteenth century and was included in various deeds. It was named for the wolves which once lived here, and thus is often incorrectly associated with Israel Putnam. It also may have referred to a person with a similar last name.

Though the rock is situated on a 40-foot part of the ledge, the ledge itself goes up to 544 feet and dips down to 25 feet in some places. There is a cairn located nearby.

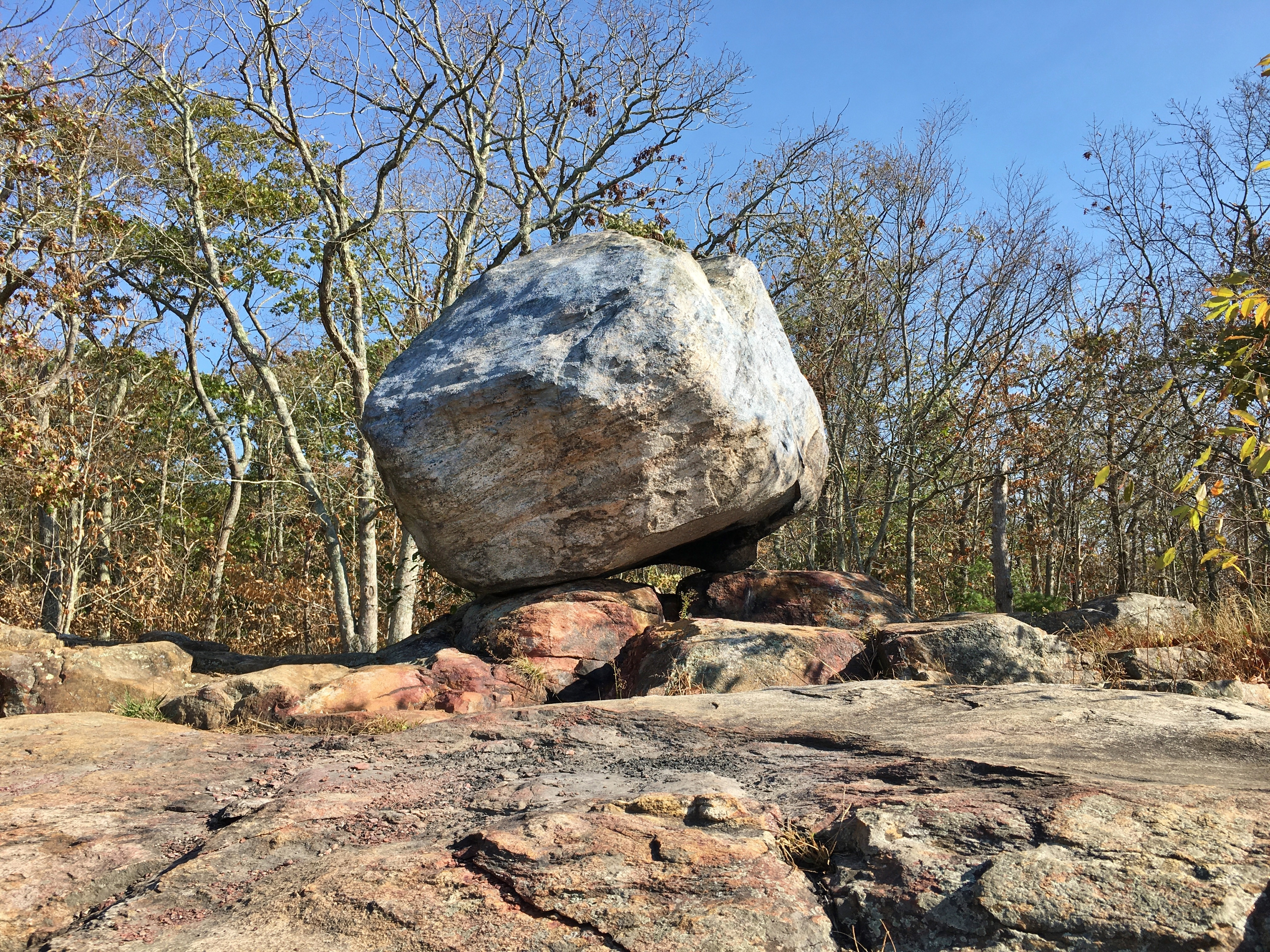
View of Wolf Rock looking towards trail (October 2020)

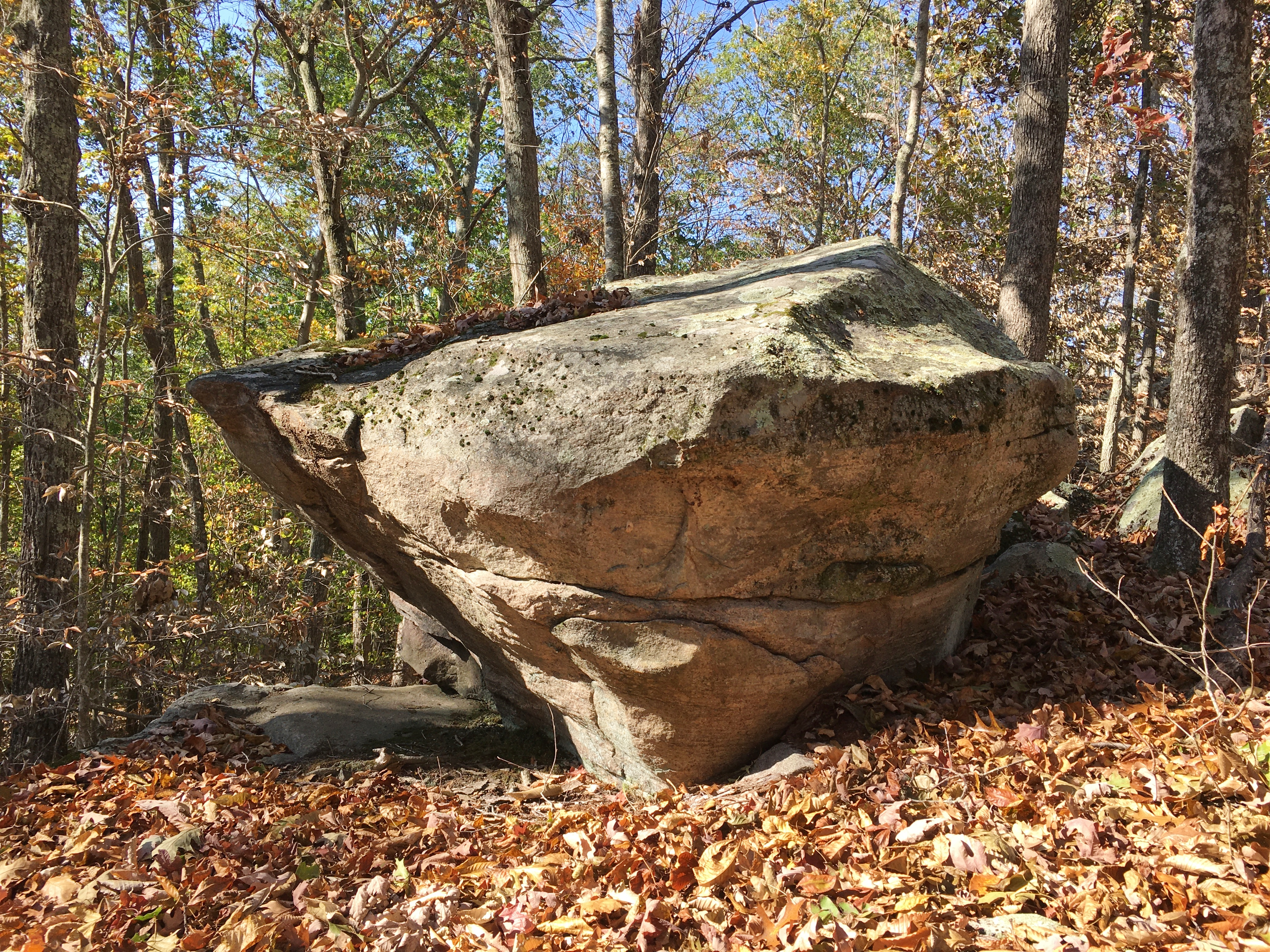
Glacial rock in Wolf Rock Nature Preserve (October 2020)

== See also ==
- List of individual rocks
