= Joshua's Tract Conservation and Historic Trust =

U.S. nonprofit organization

- Founded: 1966
- Type: Land Trust, Historic Trust
- Location: Mansfield, Connecticut
- Region served: Andover, Ashford, Chaplin, Columbia, Coventry, Eastford, Franklin, Hampton, Lebanon, Mansfield, Mansfield Center, Scotland, Storrs, Tolland, Willington, Windham, and Woodstock, Connecticut.
- Members: Over 800
- Employees: five
- Website: joshuastrust.org

Joshua's Tract Conservation and Historic Trust, or Joshua's Trust, is a non-profit 501(c)(3) land trust operating in northeast Connecticut. Joshua's Trust was incorporated in 1966 to help conserve property of significant natural or historic interest. As of 2011, the Trust protects more than 5,000 acres, maintains 42 miles (68 km) of trails that are open to the public, holds educational outreach programs, and publishes the Joshua's Tract Walkbook.

== History ==
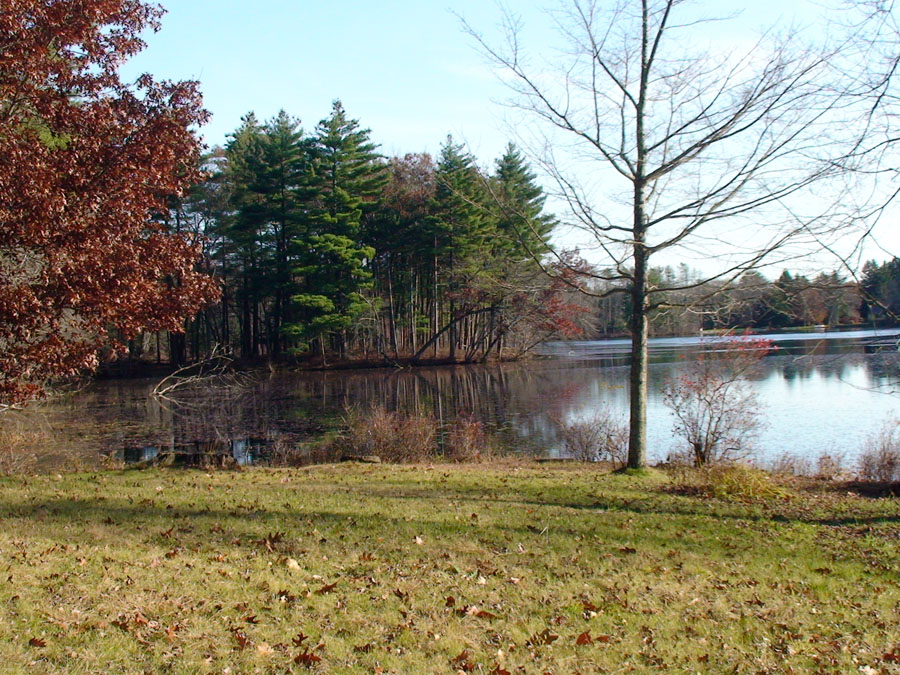
Joshua's Trust Lake Marie at the Allanach-Wolf Woodlands, a preserve in Windham, Connecticut

In 1676 Attawanhood (also known as Joshua), son of Uncas and Sachem of the Mohegans, died just after fighting in King Philip's War. Many of the towns in Mohegan territory, land north and east of New London, Groton and Stonington, owed their existence to grants from Uncas or his sons. This included all of the current Windham county and the principal part of Tolland county. Joshua, the third son, in his will left his hunting grounds to "sixteen men of Norwich"; this included the then town of Windham, a tract nearly 10 miles square, and Mansfield. Settlements followed swiftly, in Mansfield at 'Ponde Place', Windham, and also in today's towns of Scotland, Chaplin, and Hampton.

In 1966, two-hundred and ninety years later, motivated by the rapid development of the area, the efforts of the Mansfield Historical Society and the Mansfield Conservation Commission resulted in the incorporation of Joshua's Tract Conservation and Historic Trust. The Madison Land Trust provided assistance, and individuals donated $1,400. The founding trustees were Floyd M. Callward, Samuel G. Dodd, John M. Evans, George A. Baker Jr. and Gertrude M. Lamb.

Joshua's Trust acquired its first property, Bradley-Buchanan Woods, in 1970. This was followed by the Wolf Rock property, the Ashford Oak and others, including in 1978 the historic Gurleyville Gristmill and miller's cottage, birthplace of Wilbur Cross, the 56th governor of Connecticut. Many of these early trust properties now abut other conserved lands, significantly increasing the size of the protected habitat.

In 1991 the Trust's holdings including preserves and easements reached 2,000 acres, and nineteen years later they crossed the 4,000 acre mark.

In 1992 the Trust needed storage and office space and began to look at the historic Eagleville Schoolhouse in the Town of Mansfield. It was previously used by the Mansfield Historical Society as a museum but subsequently left unoccupied. After negotiating a 30-year lease and renovating the building, Joshua's Trust moved their operations to the former one-room schoolhouse at the corner of Routes 32 and 275 in Mansfield.

Joshua's Trust preserve sign at the entrance to Friedman Forest in Ashford, Connecticut

Approaching its fiftieth anniversary in 2016, Joshua's Trust is still primarily an all-volunteer organization, with one part-time conservation coordinator. The Trust relies on volunteers for most of its activities, including funding, stewardship, office work and outreach efforts.

The Trust's logo is a replica of the signature mark made by the original Joshua. It is referred to as "Joshua's Mark" or sometimes, colloquially, as "the critter".

== Mission ==
Joshua's Trust was founded to preserve the rural character of the area, to acquire and assure the preservation of the land and natural resources, to acquire and protect land having a unique or historical significance to the area, and to assist in the development of an open space program. In addition, the Trust engages in and promotes education, training, and scientific study of the natural world.

== Area served ==
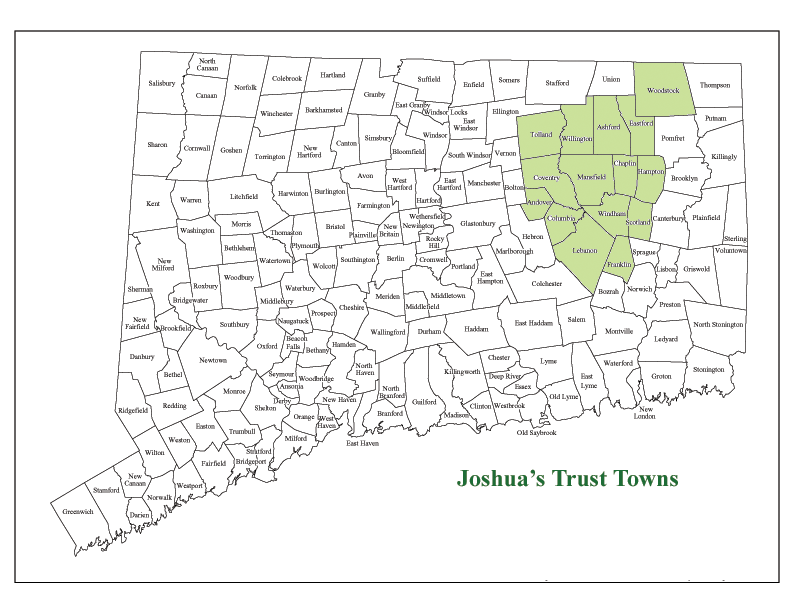
Joshua's Trust towns in Connecticut

The towns served by Joshua's Trust contain some of the last undeveloped property in the New York-Boston corridor. Significant swaths of undeveloped forest, rivers and watersheds of major significance and farms populate the area. Pilots, flying overhead at night, were struck by the lack of artificial illumination in the as-yet rural and undeveloped area. This gave rise to the nicknames like "the Quiet Corner" and "the Last Green Valley". As of 2009, 70% of the area was still field, forest or farmland. In 1994, the surrounding Shetucket-Quinebaug Heritage Corridor, nestled between the Quinebaug and Shetucket Rivers, was granted National Heritage Corridor status by the National Park Service. In 1999, the area was enlarged, creating a 35 town heritage corridor which includes all of the Joshua's Trust towns and villages.

As of 2011, Joshua's Tract Conservation and Historic Trust owns preserves and/or conservation easements in the towns and villages of Andover, Ashford, Chaplin, Columbia, Coventry, Eastford, Franklin, Hampton, Lebanon, Mansfield, Mansfield Center, Scotland, Storrs, Tolland, Willington, Windham, and Woodstock. In Mansfield, Trust properties include Proposal Rocks, Coney Rock, Wolf Rock, and the Gurley-Mason Mill Site.

== Method ==
The Trust works with landowners by accepting and managing donated land, raising funds when a significant property is offered at reduced price, and by contributing to municipal open space or agricultural preservation efforts. Recently, property owned "in fee", has been acquired as a result of subdivision activity, when municipal open space set-asides occur. Joshua's Trust also works with landowners who want to protect their land with conservation easements, which are legal restrictions on a parcel's use based on the "bundle of sticks" approach, removing the right to develop the eased property.

Preserves that are owned outright by Joshua's Trust have short and long-term management plans, implemented by Trust volunteers and property steward(s). Conservation easements are actively monitored by members of the Trust's Conservation Easements Committee.

Joshua's Trust offers workshops covering environmental stewardship issues of interest and concern, and works to encourage open space preservation and community involvement. As part of this effort, the Joshua's Trust Conservation Award is awarded to area organizations and individuals in recognition of outstanding conservation efforts.

== Awards received ==
- 2011 Excellence in Land Conservation Award from CLCC, for Successful Collaboration in Stewardship
- 2011 Positive Results Award from Conserving Tolland
- 2009 Outstanding Stewardship Effort Award from the Connecticut Land Conservation Council
- 2005 Substantial Size Award from the Connecticut Land Trust Service Bureau
- 2003 Special Achievement Award, from the Connecticut Greenways Council
- 2001 Outstanding Organization certificate from the Connecticut Forest and Park Association
- 1998 Green Circle Program Certificate presented by the Connecticut Department of Environmental Protection
- 1998 Frederick Law Olmsted Award, presented by the Connecticut Chapter of American Society of Landscape Architects.
- 1996 Connecticut Land Trust Service Bureau, Partnerships Challenge Award
- 1989 and 1987 recipient of the Connecticut Land Trust Service Bureau Protection Award

== Accreditation ==
In 2005, the executive board voted to adopt practices consistent with Land Trust Alliance guidelines, and Joshua's Trust was officially granted accredited land trust status in February 2011. This designation recognizes a land trust for its commitment to the highest ethical standards in its practices and stewardship of entrusted properties.
