= Nipmuck Trail =

Hiking trail in Connecticut, United States

Coordinates: 41°45′56″N 72°13′03″W

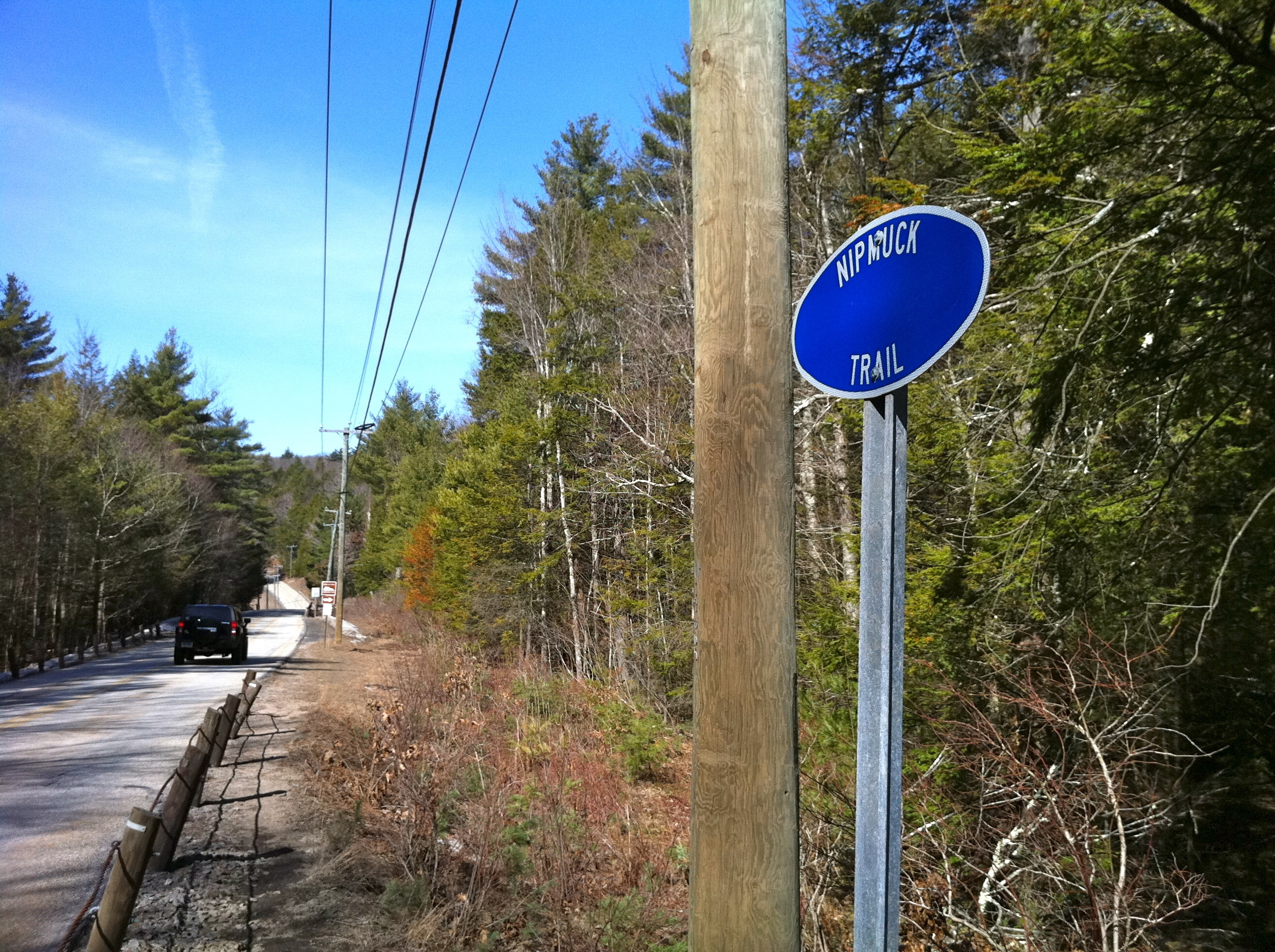
- Nipmuck Trail sign on CT-171 outside Bigelow Hollow State Park.
- Length: 34.5 miles (55.5 km)
- Location: Tolland County, Connecticut, USA
- Designation: CFPA Blue-Blazed Trail
- Use: hiking, cross-country skiing, snowshoeing, fishing, geocaching, other
- Hazards: deer ticks & poison ivy

The Nipmuck Trail is a Blue-Blazed hiking trail system which meanders through 34.5 miles (55.5 km) of forests in northeast Connecticut. It is maintained by the Connecticut Forest and Park Association and is considered one of the Blue-Blazed hiking trails. There are two southern trail heads (two tines of a fork) in the south of the town of Mansfield, Connecticut. The southwestern terminus is at a road shoulder parking place on Puddin Lane, and the southeastern terminus is a DEEP parking lot on North Windham Road at the southeast corner of Mansfield Hollow State Park. The northern terminus is at the north end of Breakneck Pond along the Massachusetts border in Nipmuck State Forest. Camping permits may be obtained for up to five separate locations for backpacking.

For 9 miles (14 km) the Nipmuck Trail travels through the Yale-Myers Forest which is owned by Yale University. The trail also traverses 3.5 miles (5.6 km) of the University of Connecticut's East Campus (the protected Moss tract through the Fenton Forest). For about 6 miles, the trail follows the Fenton River from the University of Connecticut to Mansfield Hollow State Park.

== Trail description ==
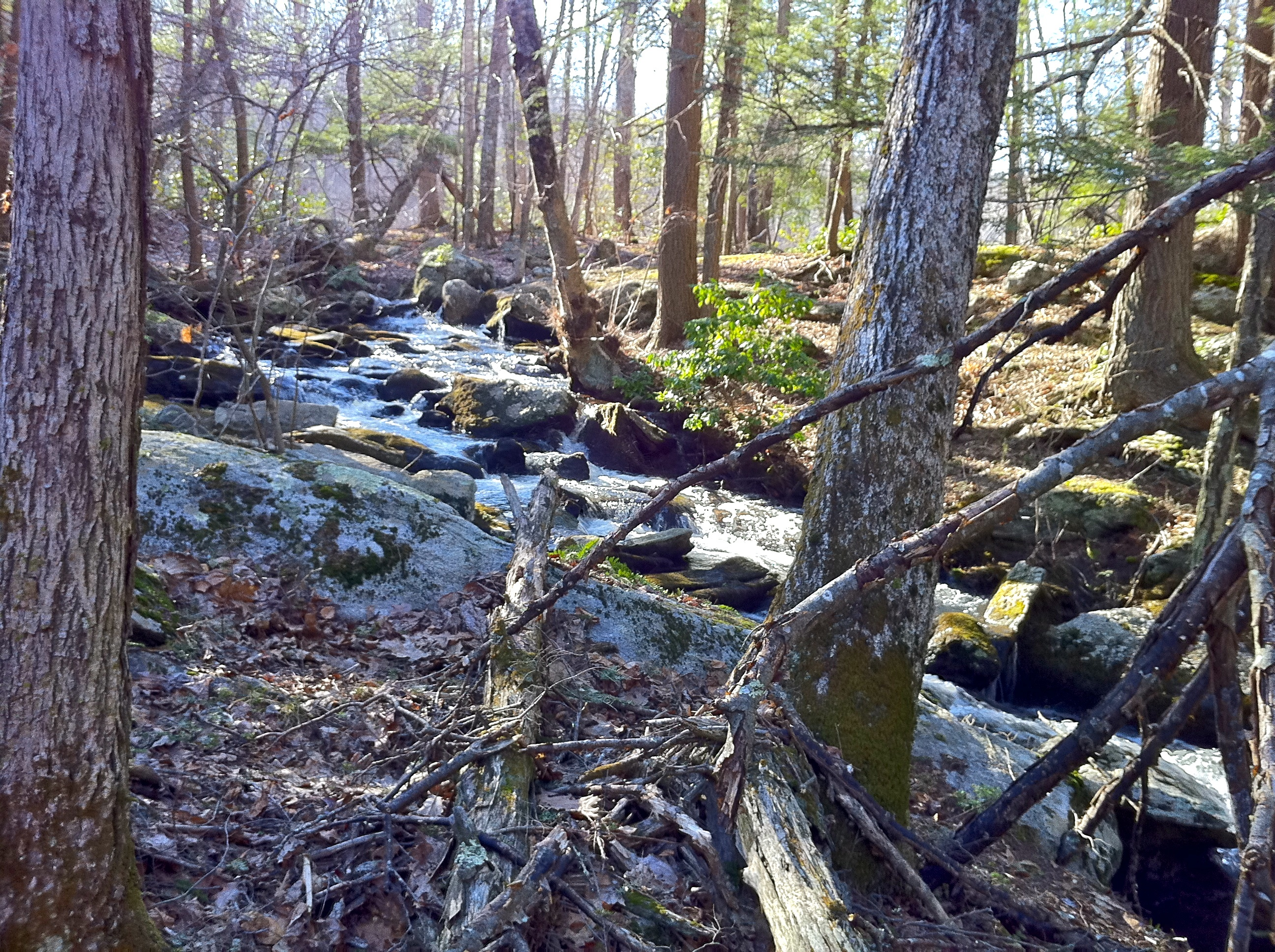
Pixie Falls in Natchaug State Forest in Ashford via side trail from Nipmuck Trail.

The Nipmuck Trail is primarily used for hiking, backpacking, picnicking, and in the winter, snowshoeing.

Portions of the trail are suitable for, and are used for, cross-country skiing and geocaching. Site-specific activities enjoyed along the route include bird watching, hunting (very limited), fishing, horseback riding, bouldering and rock climbing (limited).

The mainline trail is blazed with blue rectangles. Trail descriptions are available from a number of commercial and non-commercial sources, and a complete guidebook is published by the Connecticut Forest and Park Association

=== Historic sites ===
There is a historic gristmill near the trail in Storrs, Connecticut. Across from this is the house where Wilbur Cross was born. A segment of the trail in Ashford follows the Old Connecticut Path, a former Native American trail connecting the Boston area with the Connecticut River Valley.

== History ==
The Blue-Blazed Nipmuck Trail was created by the Connecticut Forest and Park Association.

=== Maintenance ===
The last week of March 2010 the Connecticut Forest and Park Association acquired the largest conservation easement in an agreement with the University of Connecticut for the 3.5 miles (5.6 km) section of the Nipmuck Trail which passes through University of Connecticut protected property (the Moss tract through the Fenton Forest). Also on that date a number of conveyances between the University of Connecticut, CFPA, the Norcross Wildlife Foundation and the towns of Willington and Mansfield secured the preservation of 531 acres (2.15 km^{2}) of land on four forested properties near or surrounding the Nipmuck Trail.

== Gallery ==
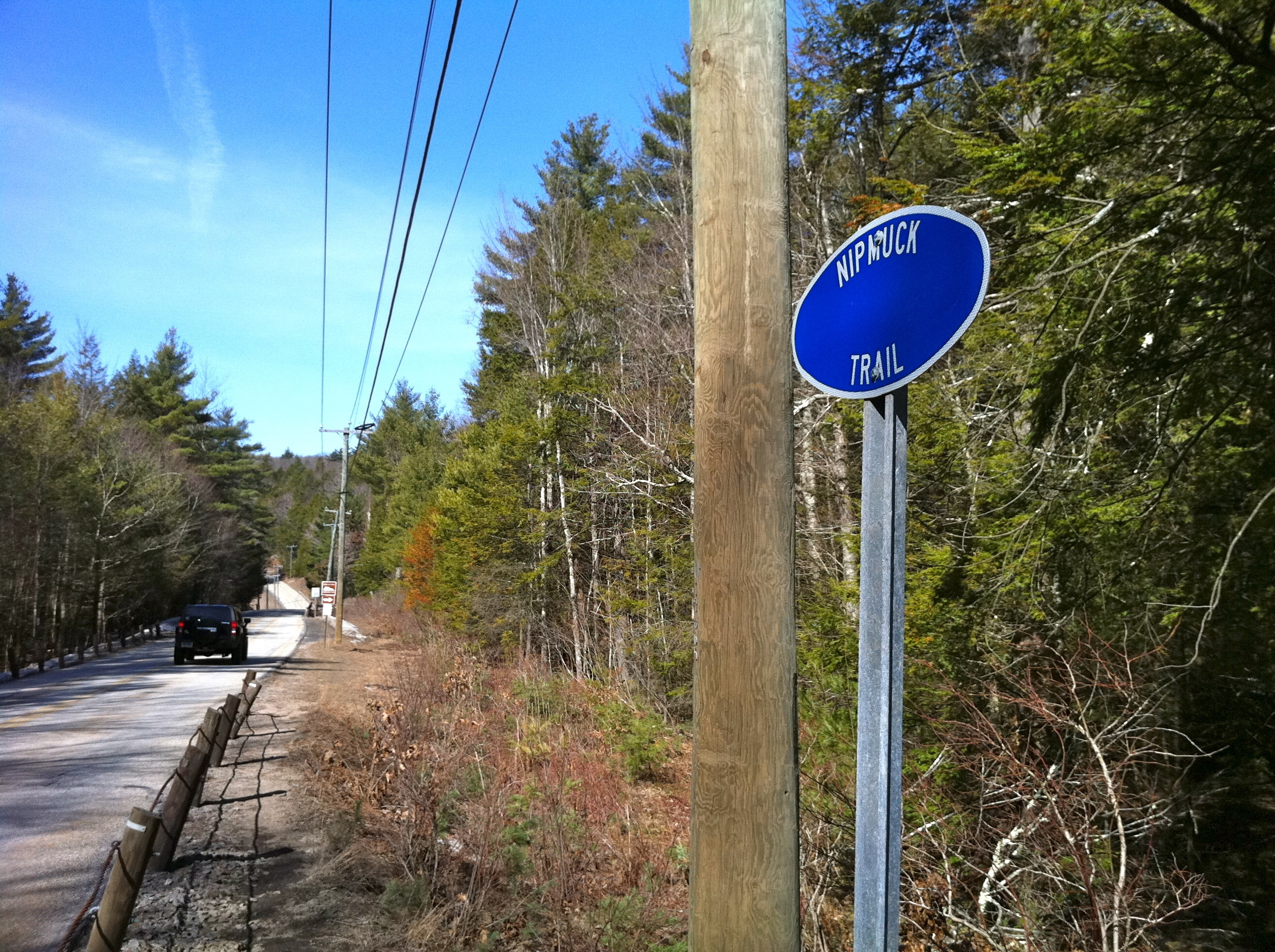
Nipmuck Trail sign on CT-171 outside Bigelow Hollow State Park.

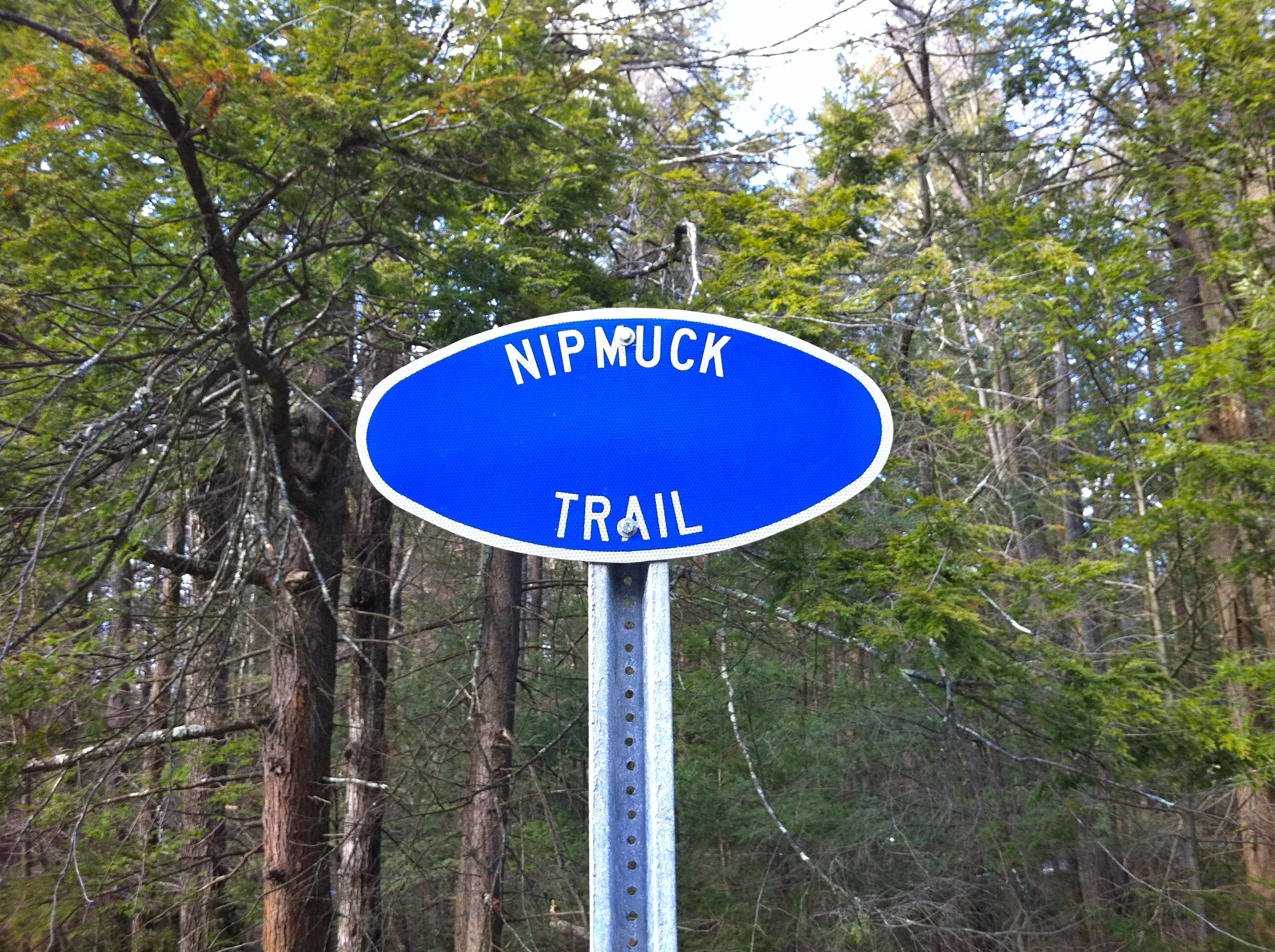
Nipmuck Trail sign on CT-171 outside Bigelow Hollow State Park.

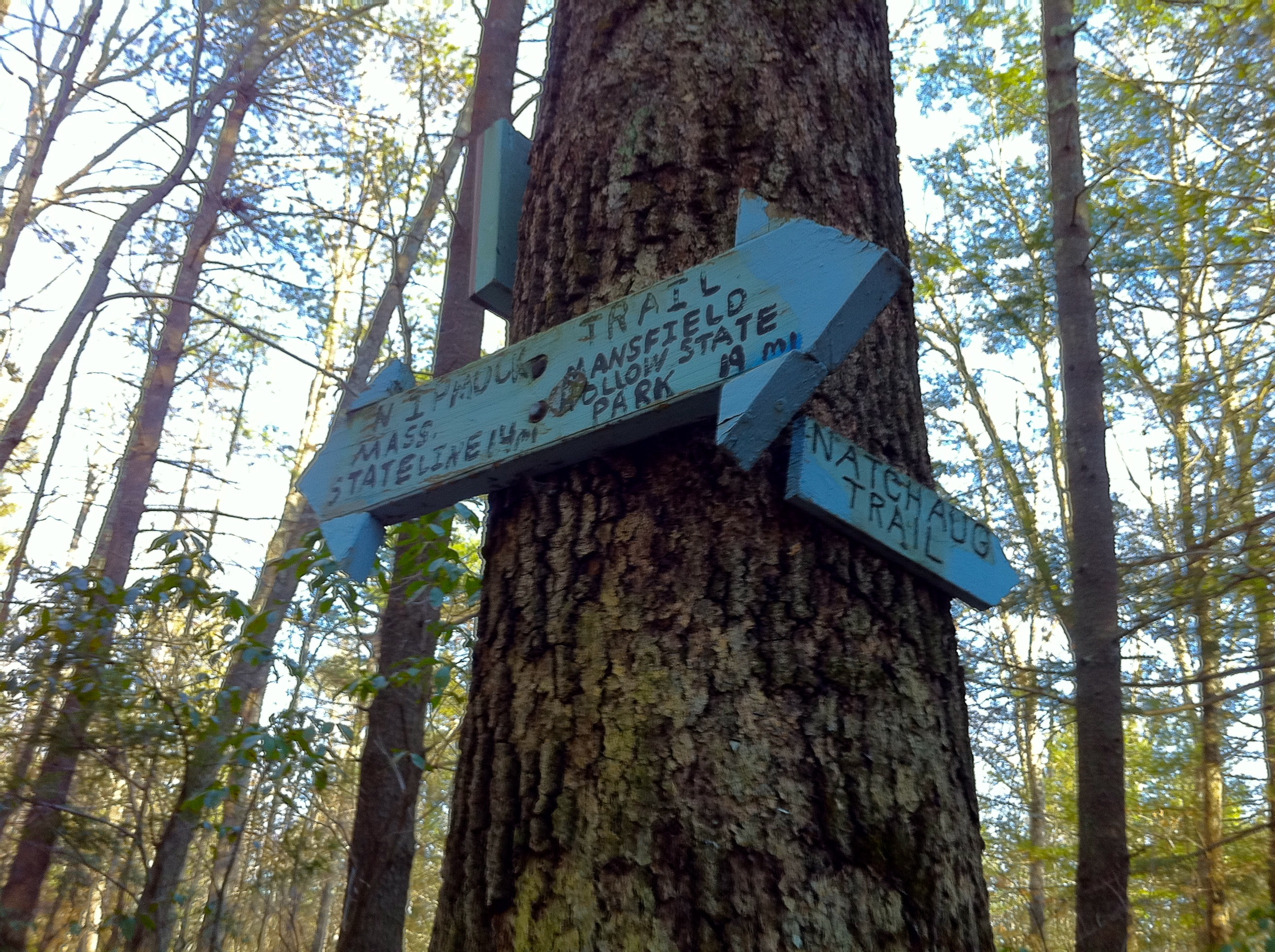
Natchaug Trail northern trailhead at intersection with Nipmuck Trail in Ashford, CT.

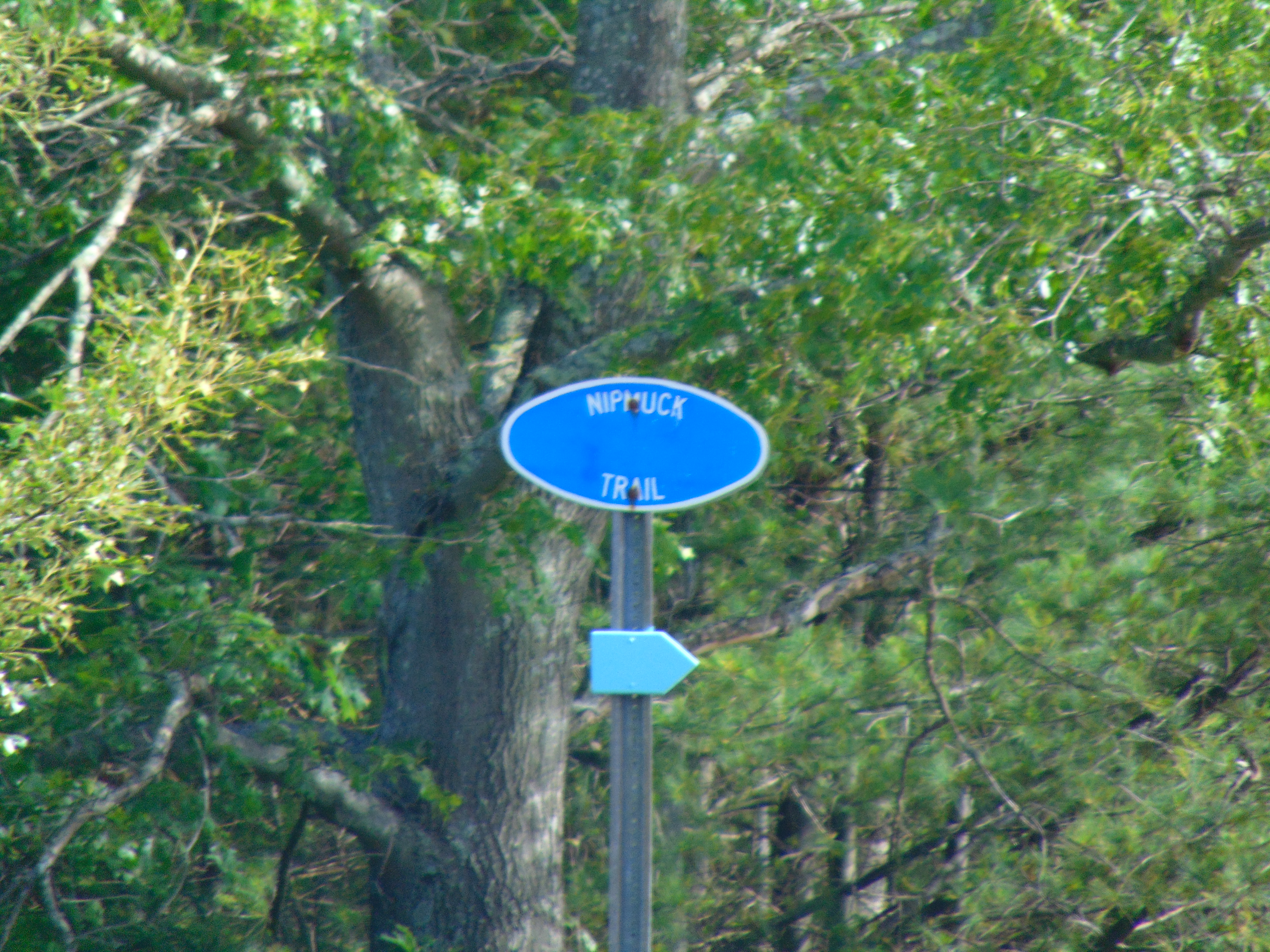
The trail in the Mansfield Hollow State Park in Mansfield, Connecticut.

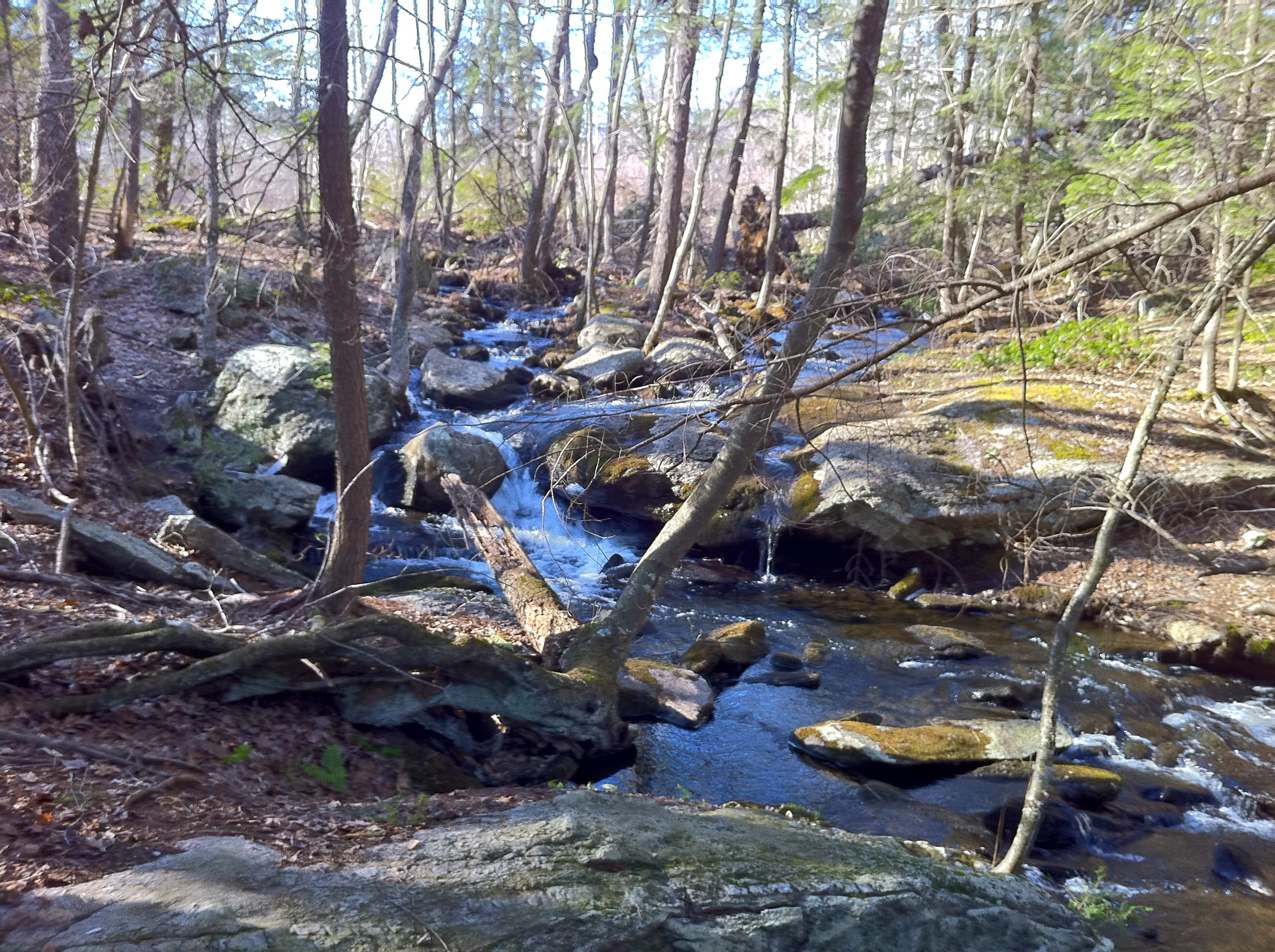
Pixie Falls in Natchaug State Forest in Ashford via side trail from Nipmuck Trail.

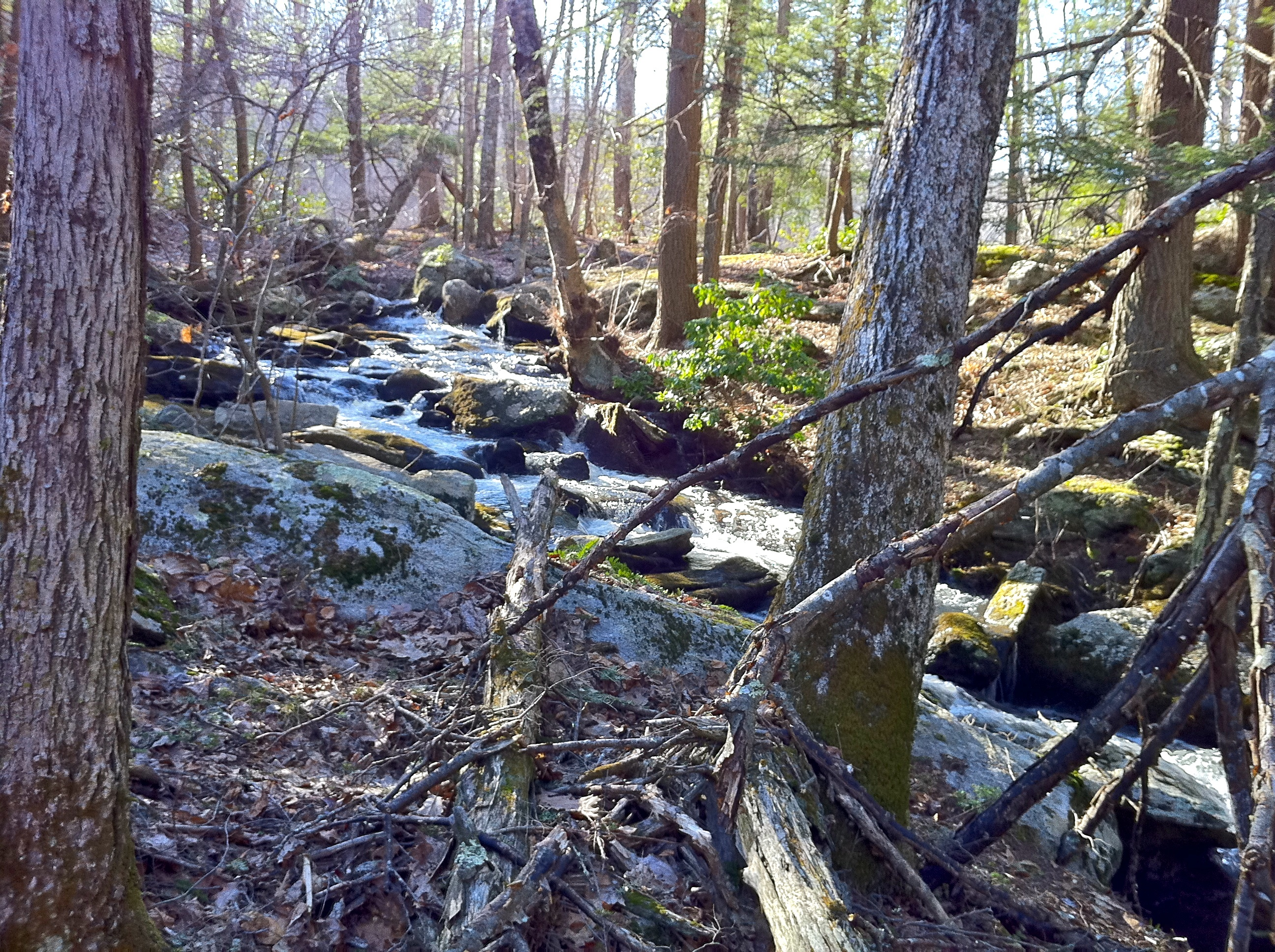
Pixie Falls in Natchaug State Forest in Ashford via side trail from Nipmuck Trail.

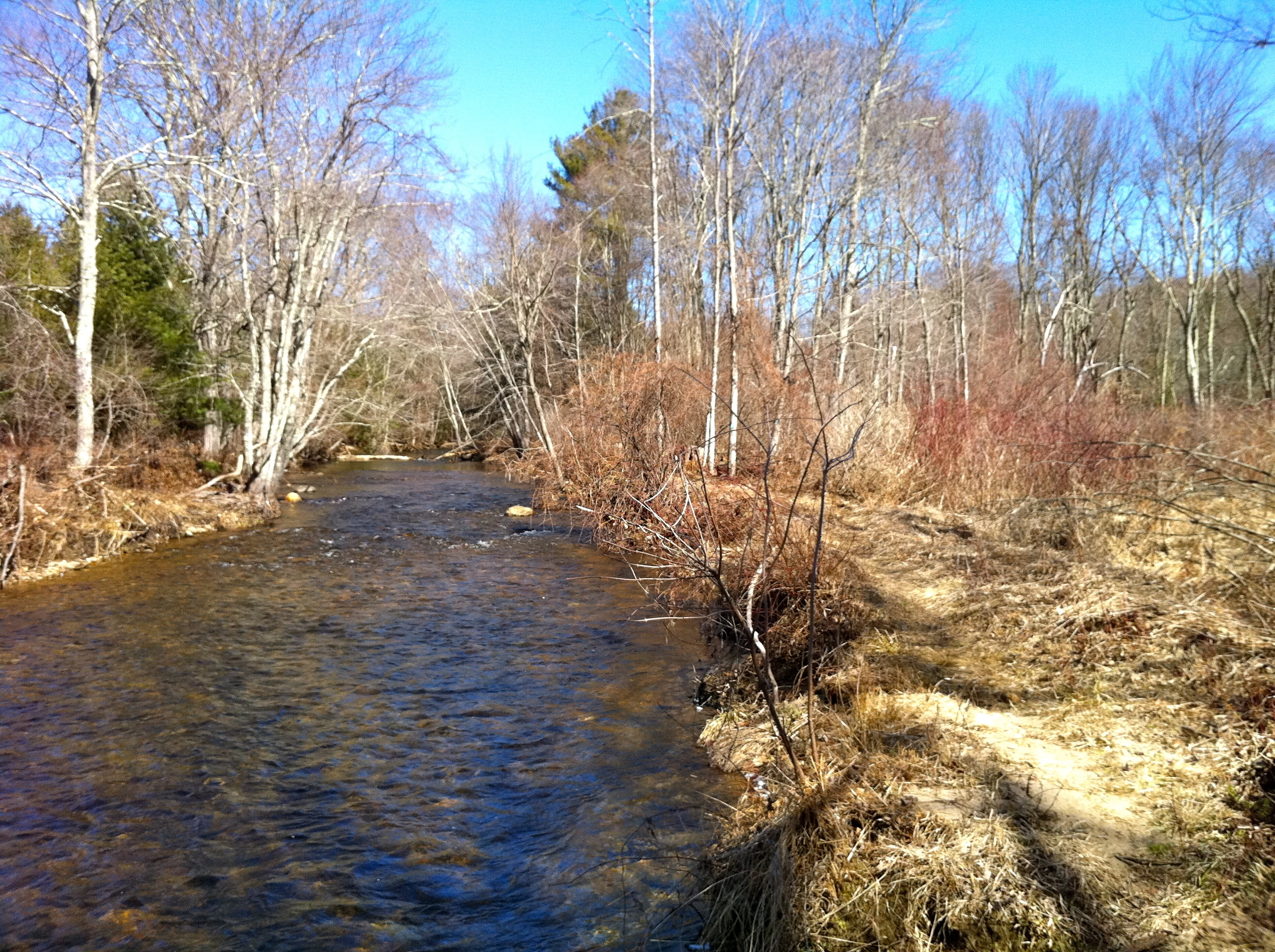
Fenton River along Nipmuck Trail just north of CT Route44 (U Conn Forest).

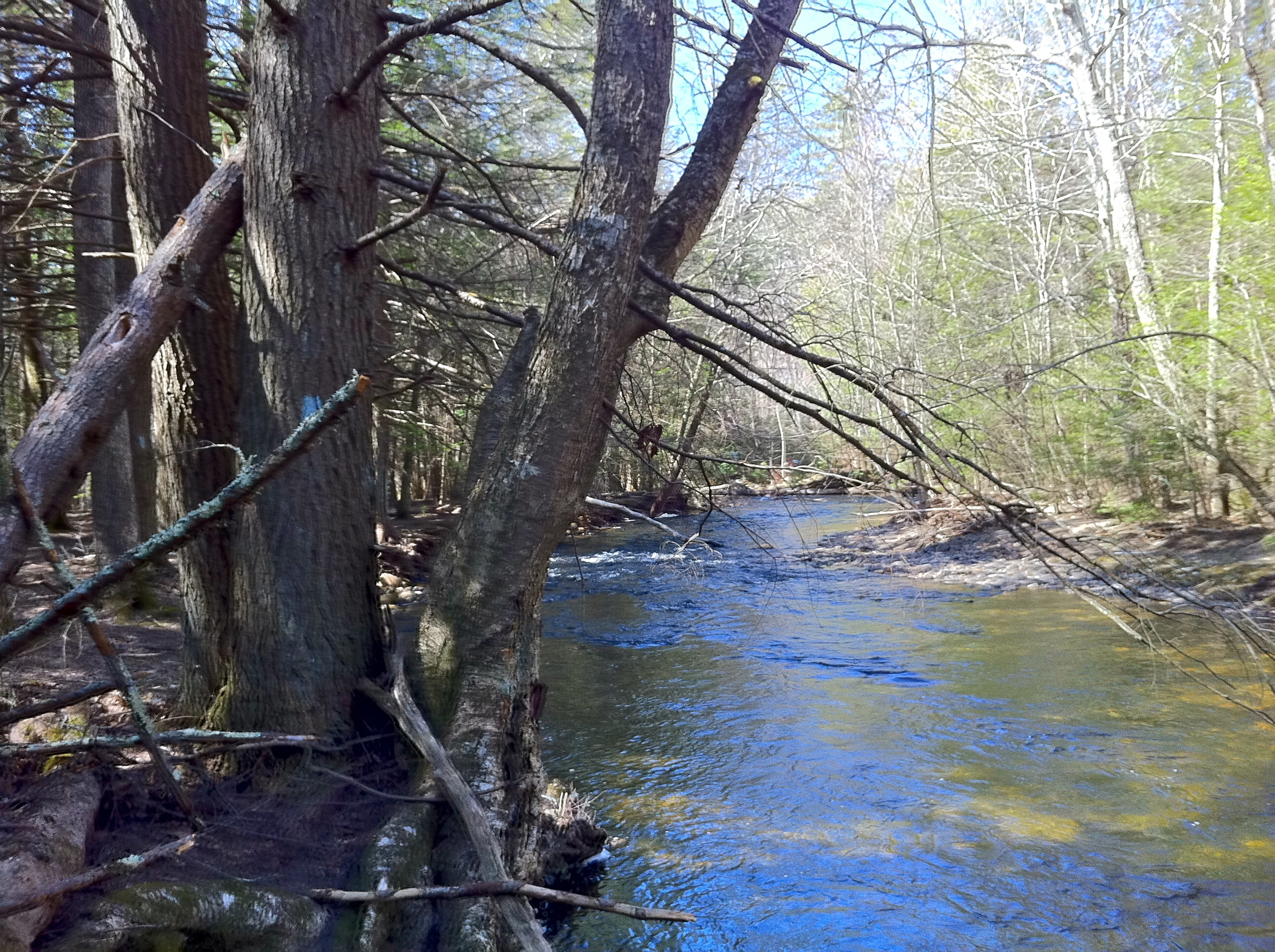
Fenton River along Nipmuck Trail just north of CT Route44 (U Conn Forest).

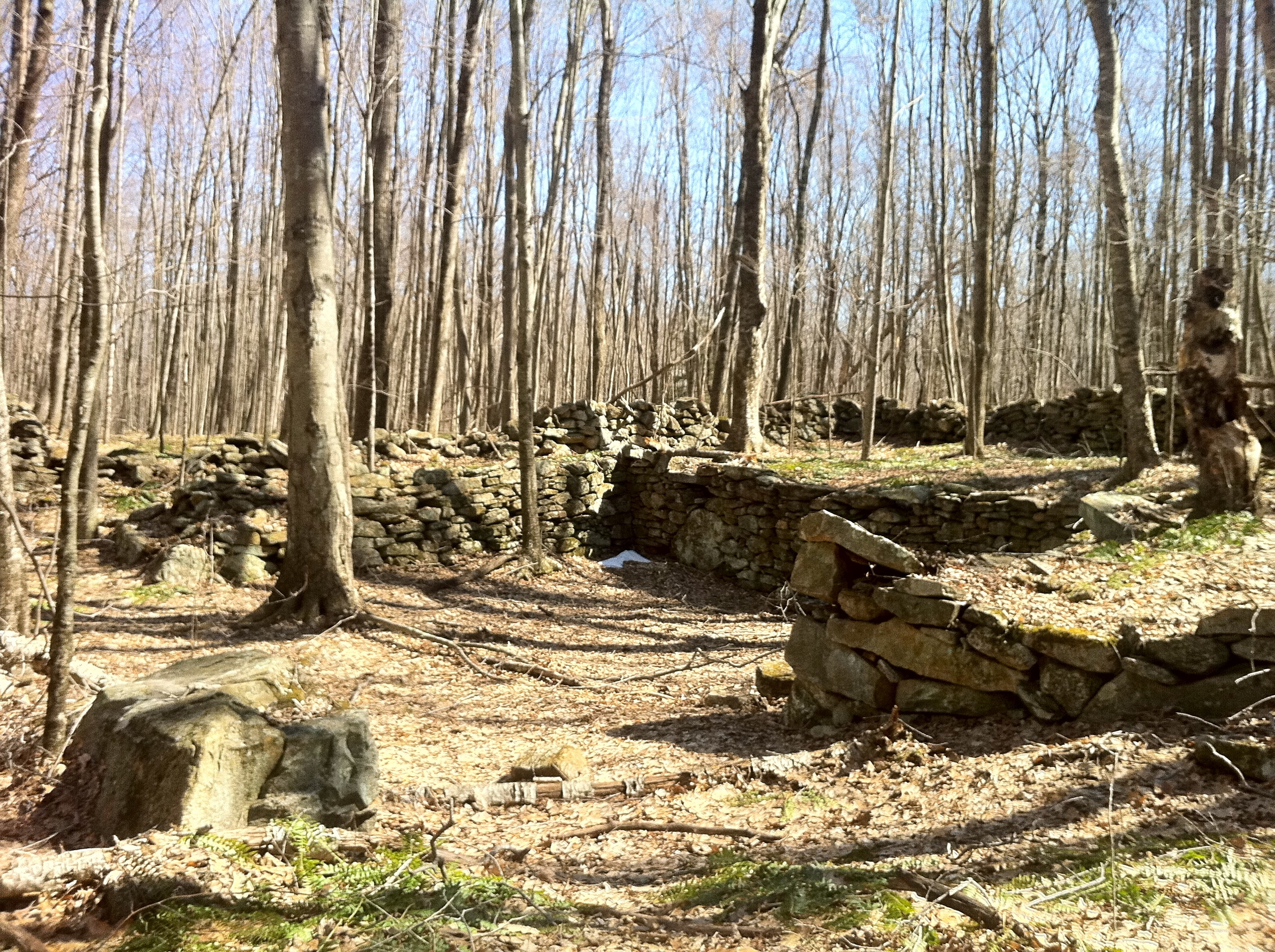
Old stone house foundations at intersection of Nipmuck Trail and forest road halfway between CT Routes 44 and 74.

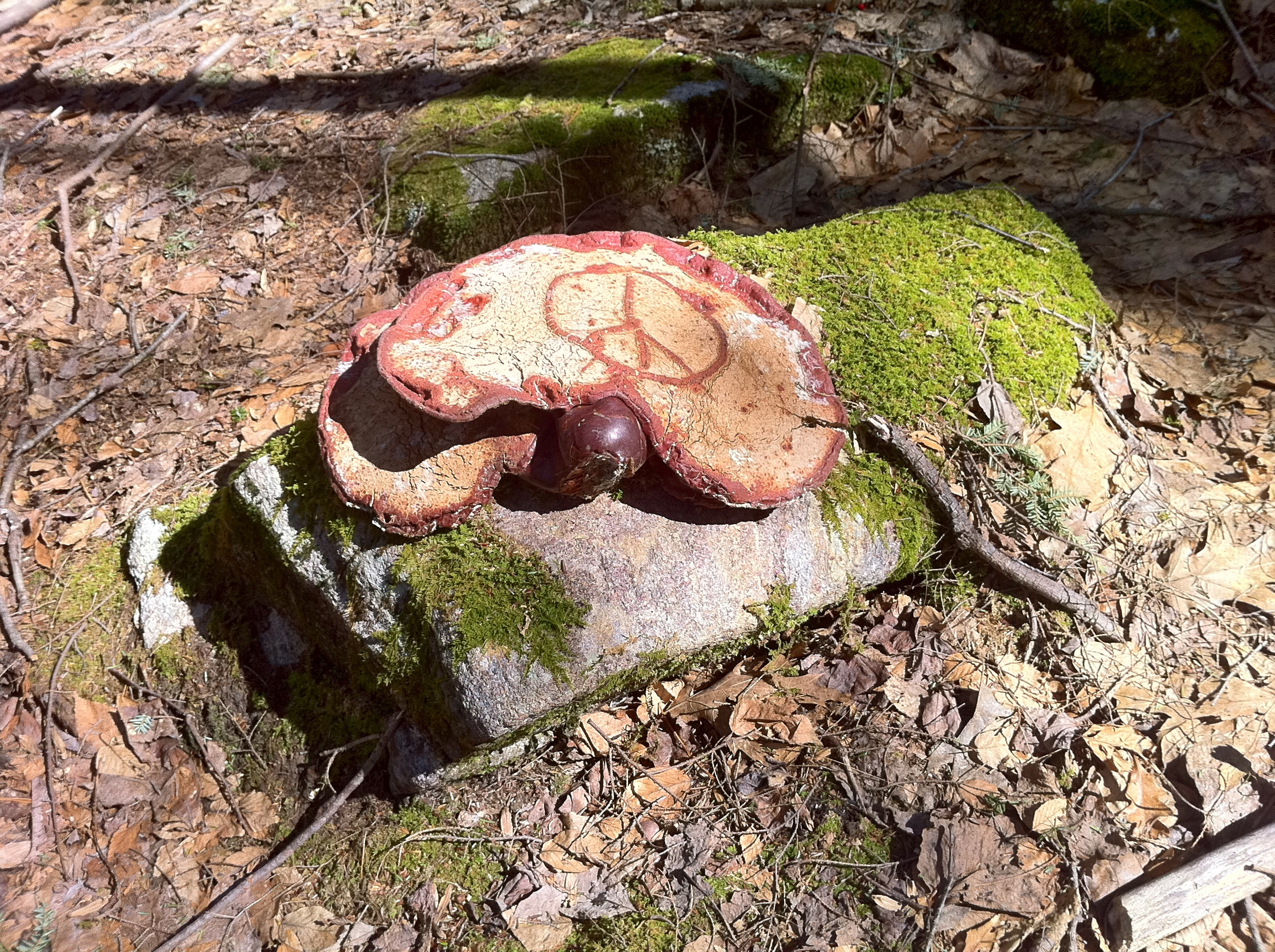
1' diameter fungus with peace sign on rock beside Nipmuck Trail in Yale-Myers Forest.

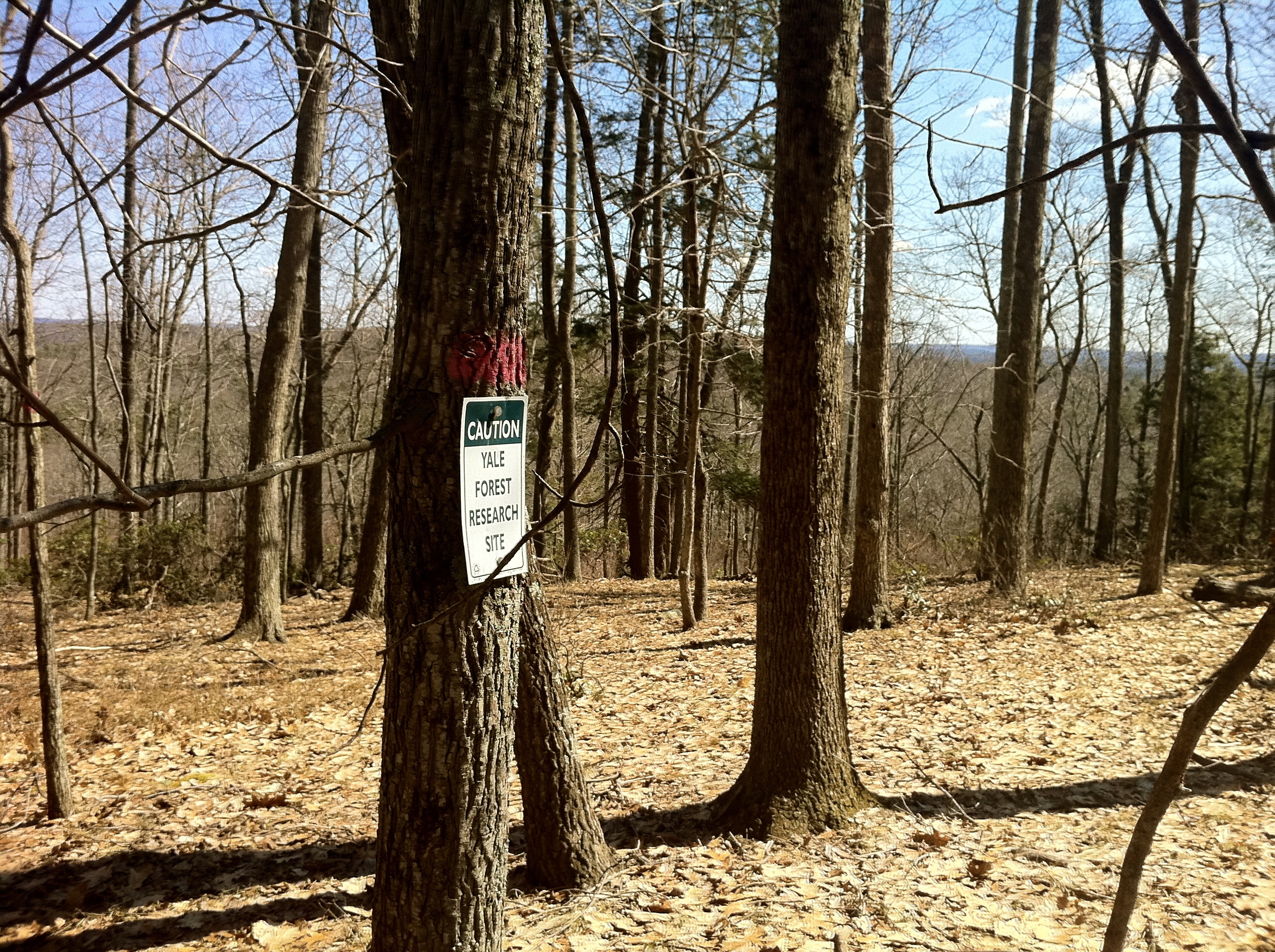
Yale-Myers Forest Research Site off Nipmuck Trail.

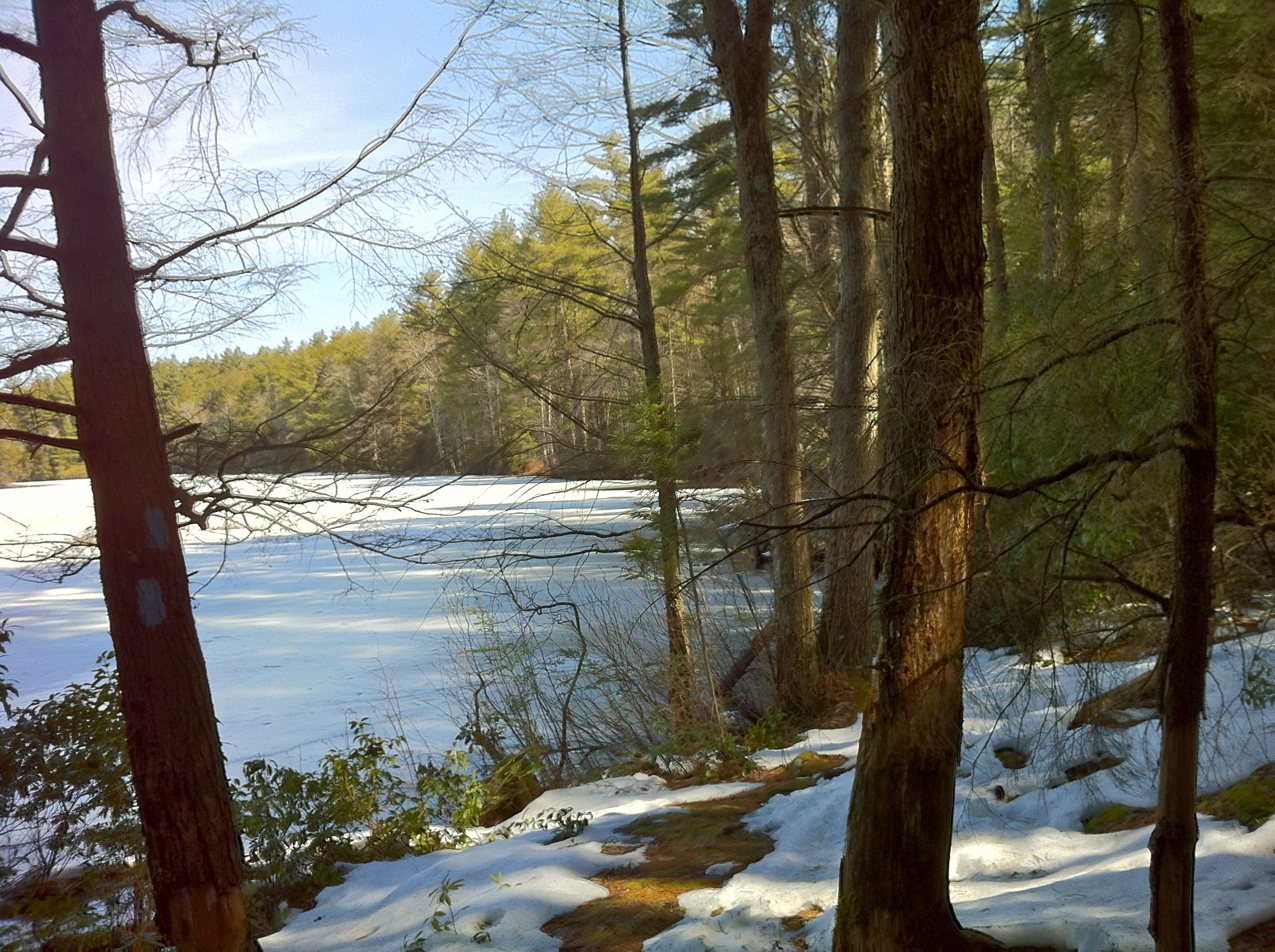
Southern Breakneck Pond on Nipmuck Trail facing north on the last day of winter.

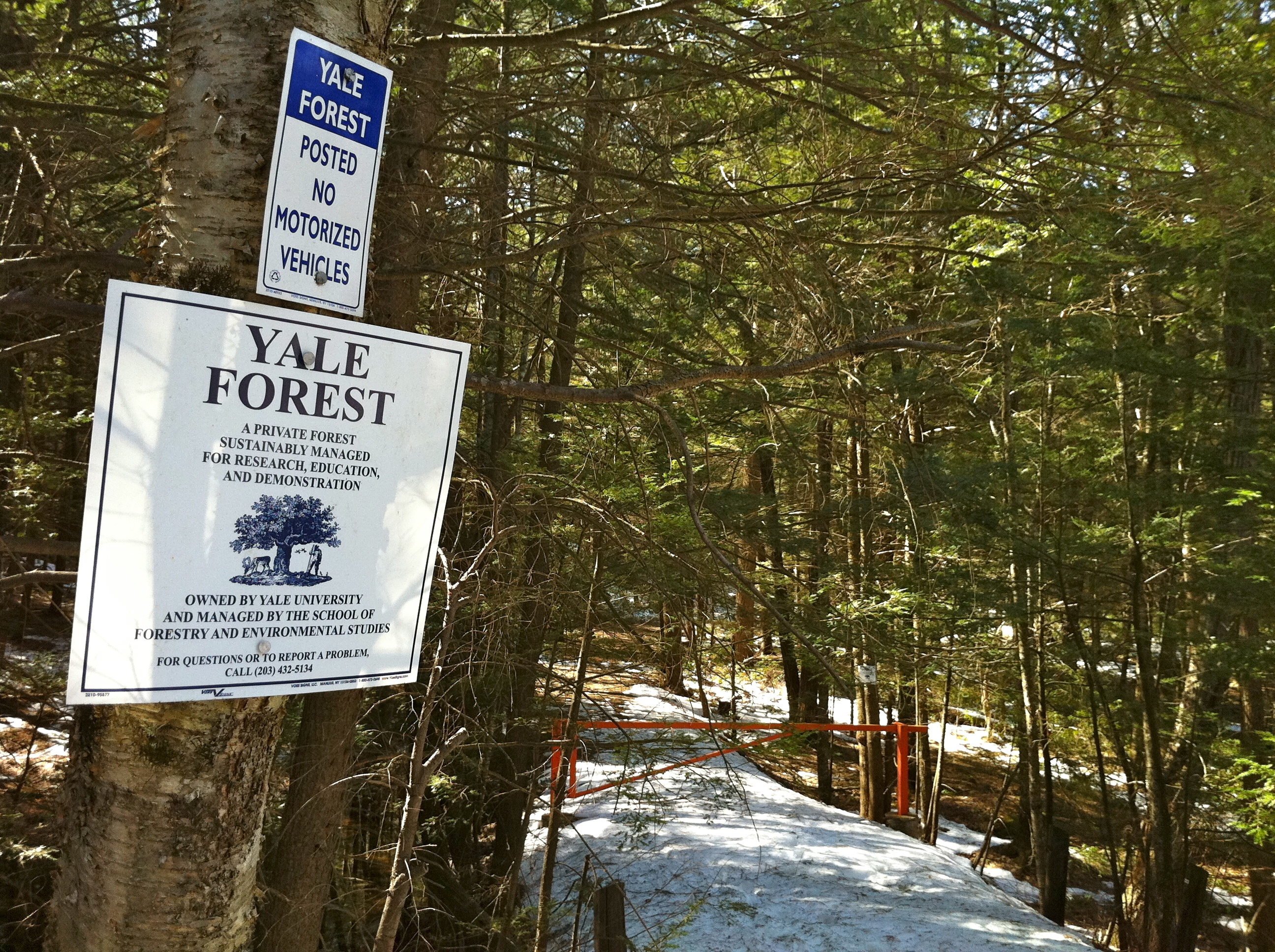
Yale-Myers Forest Signs and northern entrance to Nipmuck Trail on Bigelow Hollow Road AKA CT Route 197 near Bigelow Hollow State Park.

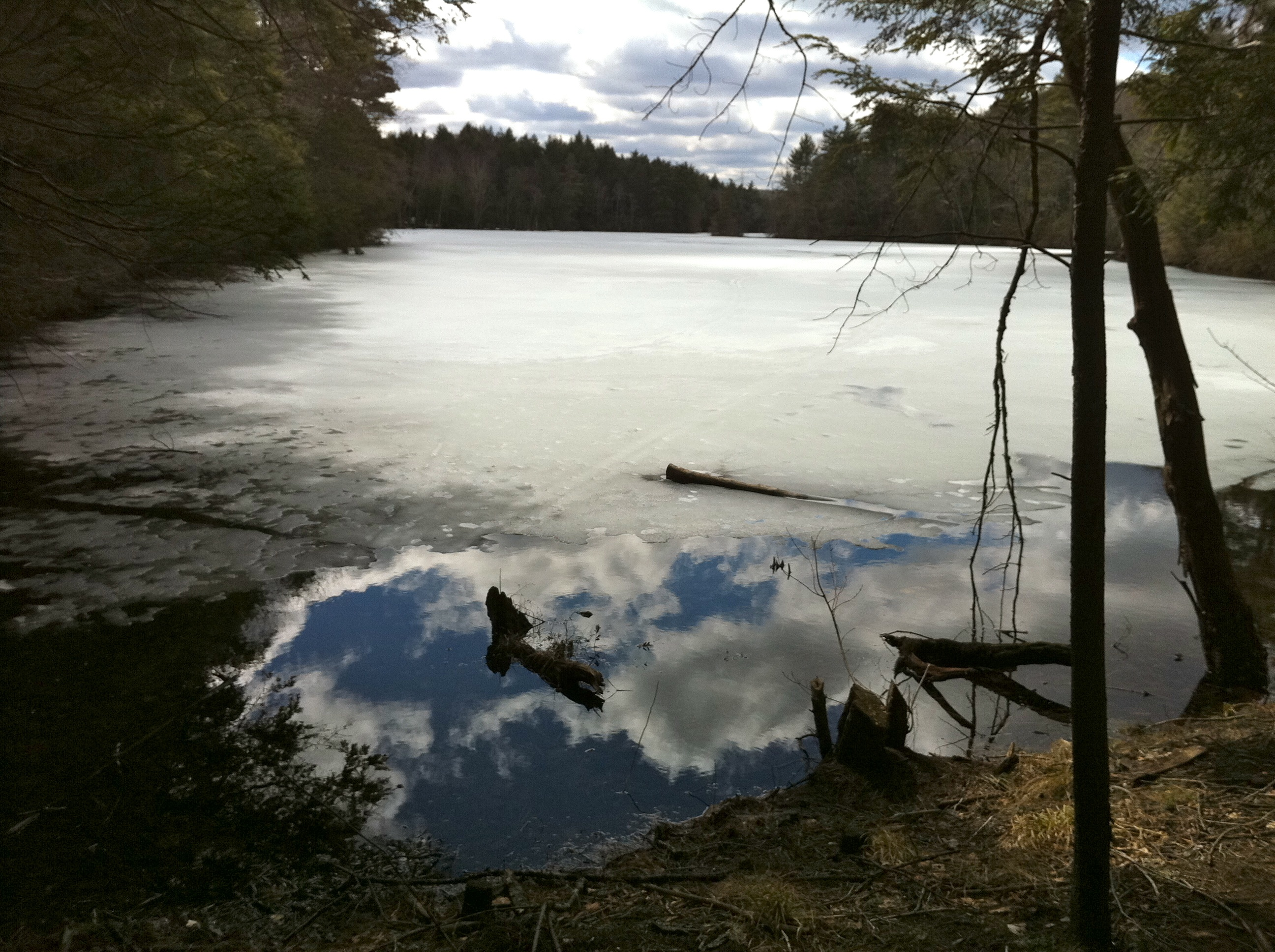
Sturbridge Massachusetts end of partially frozen Breakneck Pond facing south. Northern terminus of Nipmuck Trail.

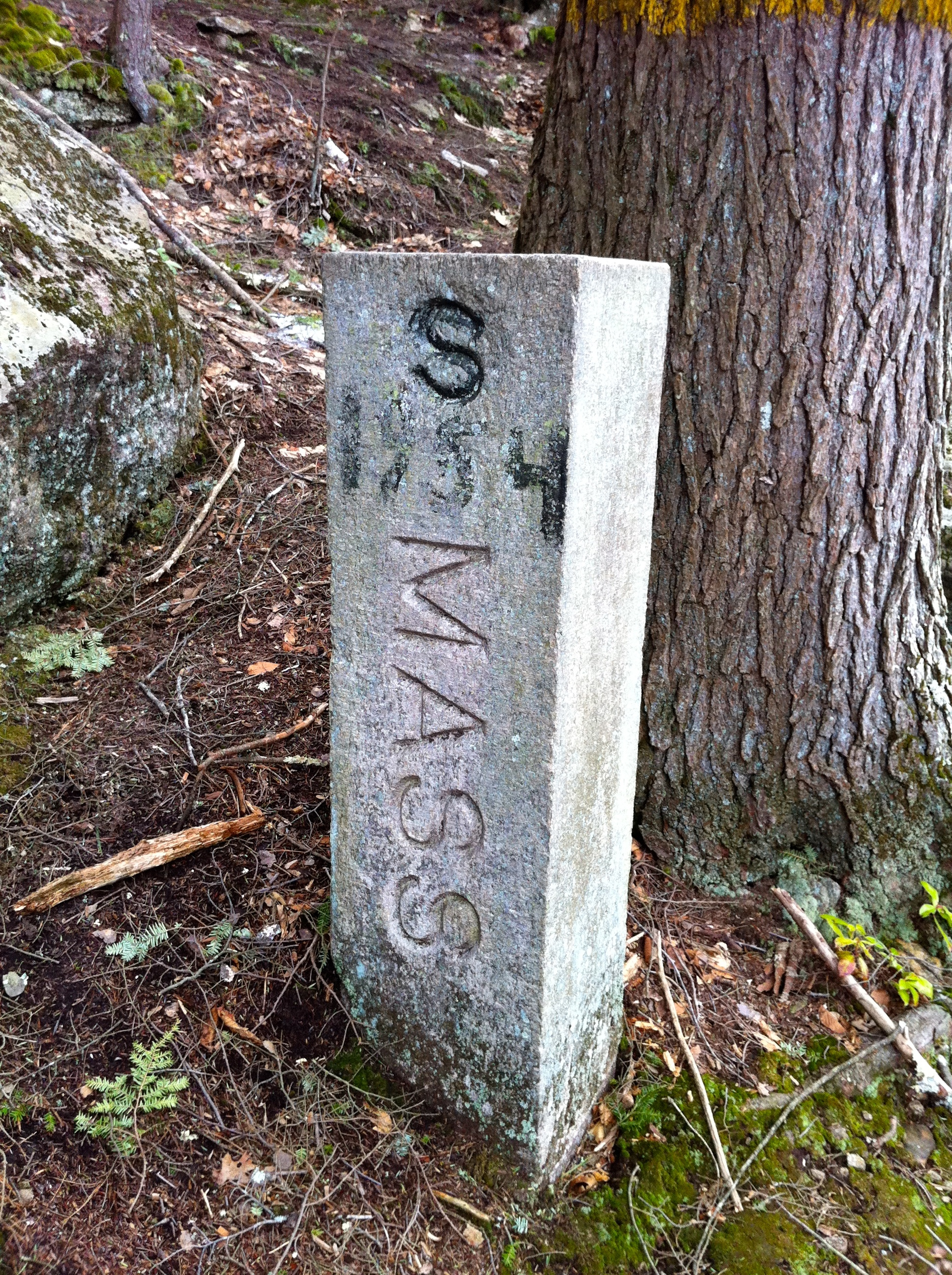
Massachusetts/Connecticut state line marker dated 1954 at northern end of Breakneck Pond facing south.

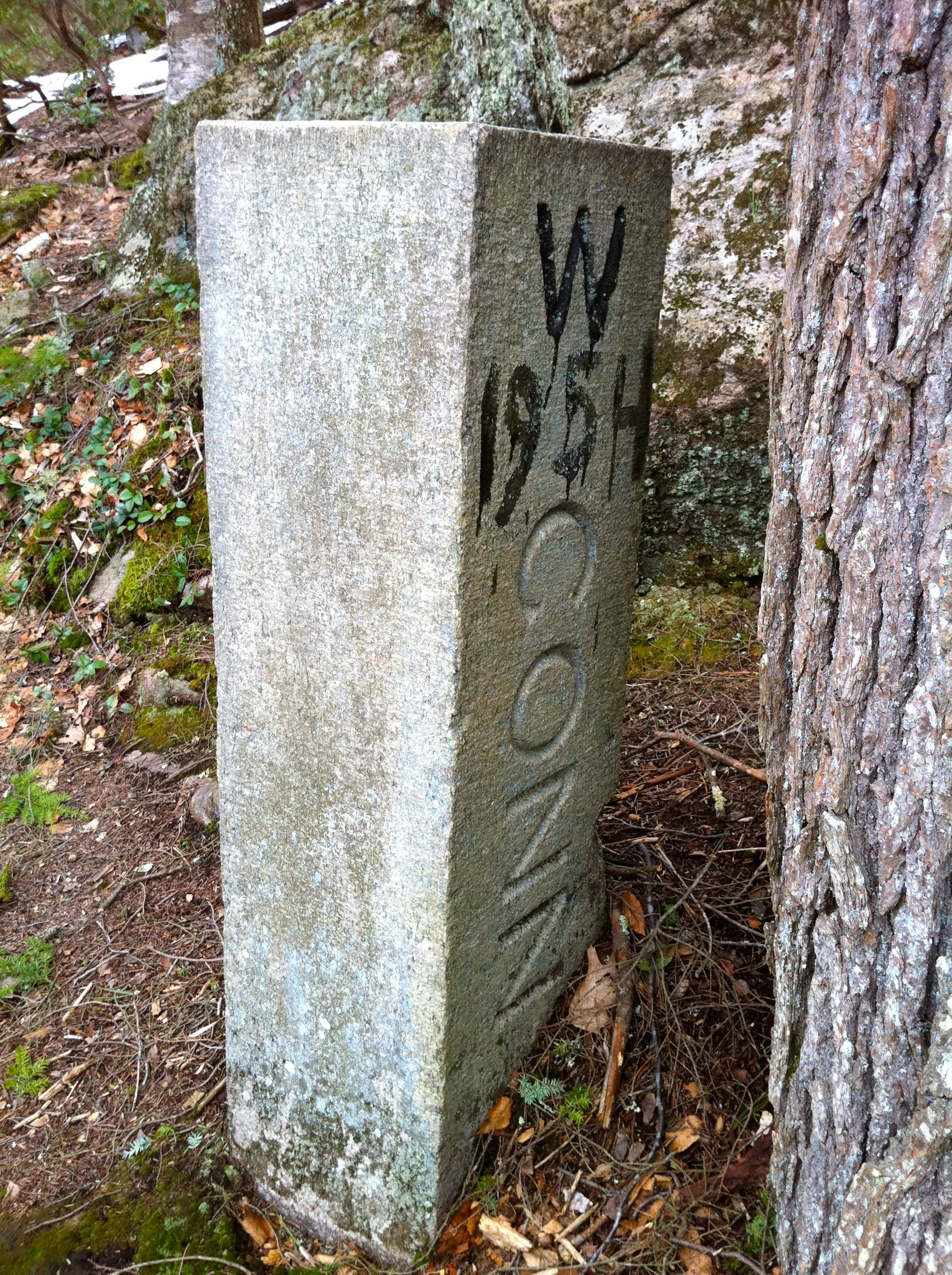
Connecticut/Massachusetts state line marker dated 1954 at northern end of Breakneck Pond facing north.

== See also ==
- Blue-Blazed Trails
- Nipmuc
- Yale-Myers Forest
- Codfish Falls
- Fifty Foot Cliff
