= March Route of Rochambeau's Army =

March Route of Rochambeau's Army includes the following road sections of the Washington–Rochambeau Revolutionary Route, all part of the National Register of Historic Places:

- March Route of Rochambeau's Army: Bailey Road
- March Route of Rochambeau's Army: Hutchinson Road
- March Route of Rochambeau's Army: Manship Road-Barstow Road
- March Route of Rochambeau's Army: Old Canterbury Road
- March Route of Rochambeau's Army: Palmer Road
- March Route of Rochambeau's Army: Plainfield Pike
- March Route of Rochambeau's Army: Ridgebury Road
- March Route of Rochambeau's Army: Scotland Road

== See also ==
- List of historic sites preserved along Rochambeau's route
