= Josiah Bronson House =

Historic house in Connecticut, United States

- U.S. National Register of Historic Places
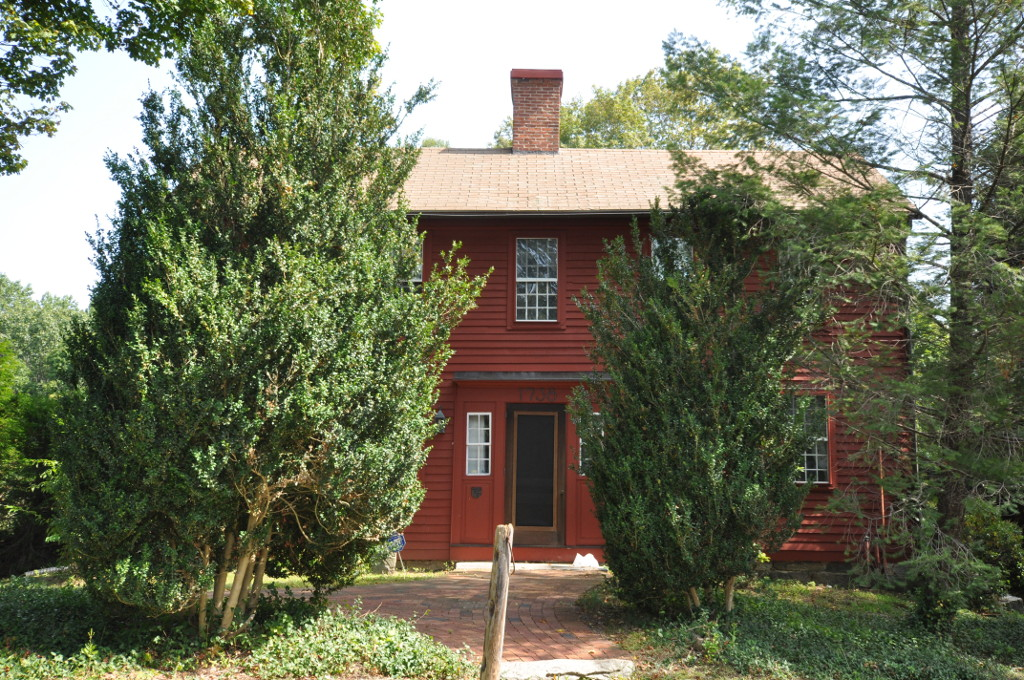

- Location within Connecticut Location within the United States
- Location: Breakneck Hill Road, Middlebury, Connecticut
- Coordinates: 41°32′51″N 73°7′29″W
- Area: 3 acres (1.2 ha)
- Built: c. 1738
- Architectural style: Georgian
- NRHP reference No.: 82004356
- Added to NRHP: February 25, 1982

The Josiah Bronson House is a historic house on Breakneck Hill Road in Middlebury, Connecticut, built in about 1738. It is Middlebury's oldest surviving house, and one of the town's few surviving 18th-century houses, acting as a good example of residential architecture from that period. It was listed on the National Register of Historic Places in 1982.

== Description and history ==
The Josiah Bronson House is located northeast of the village center of Middlebury in a rural-suburban setting on the north side of Breakneck Hill Road. It is a 2 1/2-story wood-frame structure with a gabled roof, central chimney, and clapboarded exterior. Its main façade is five bays wide with a symmetrical arrangement of windows around its main entrance. The entrance is unusually wide, with flanking sidelight windows; it was at one time sheltered by a wide portico. The house is only one room deep, suggesting that it was originally built with a lean-to section in the rear. Some time in the 19th century, the lean-to was probably removed and replaced by the present two-story kitchen. The interior retains a significant amount of original woodwork, as altered about 1800 to add some Federal details. To the rear of the house there are two barns of 19th-century or earlier construction.

The house was probably built about 1738 by Josiah Bronson, whose family was among the first to settle the Breakneck Hill area. The French Army commanded by the Marquis de Lafayette is known to have camped in the area during the American Revolutionary War in 1781 and 1782.

== See also ==
- March Route of Rochambeau's army
- List of historic sites preserved along Rochambeau's route
- National Register of Historic Places listings in New Haven County, Connecticut
