= March Route of Rochambeau's Army: Scotland Road =

- U.S. National Register of Historic Places
- U.S. Historic district
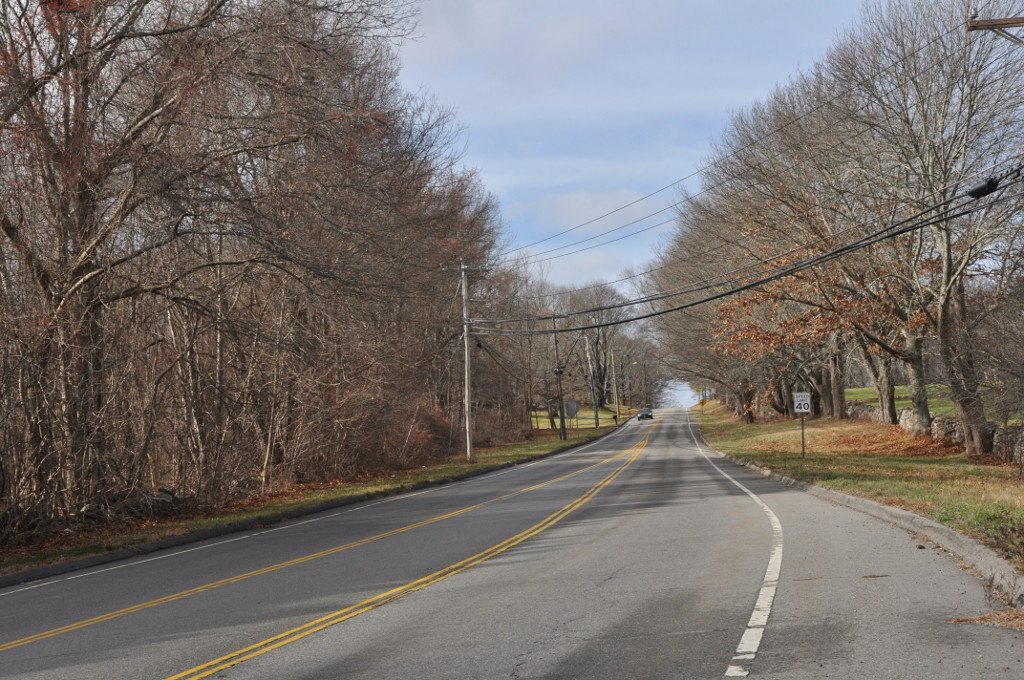
- Scotland Road, in 2016

- Location within Connecticut Location within the United States
- Location: Scotland Road, from Intersection with Back Road to 80 Scotland Road, Windham, Connecticut
- Coordinates: 41°42′3″N 72°8′43″W
- Area: 2 acres (0.81 ha)
- MPS: Rochambeau's Army in Connecticut, 1780-1782 MPS
- NRHP reference No.: 03000314

Significant dates
- Dates of significance: 1781, 1782
- Added to NRHP: June 6, 2003

The March Route of Rochambeau's Army: Scotland Road is a historic road section in Windham, Connecticut. Extending along Scotland Road (Connecticut Route 14), from itsintersection with Back Rd. to 80 Scotland Road in, it is an evocative portion of the historic march route of the French Army under the Comte de Rochambeau in 1781 and 1782 during the American Revolutionary War. The troops camped beside the road within this segment in 1782. It was listed on the National Register of Historic Places in 2003.

== Description and history ==
Scotland Road is the name given to the main road running east from Windham Center to Scotland. A short distance east of Windham Center, the road descends a slope, lined on both sides with stone walls. There are a few houses on the south side, with fields behind, and much of the north side is an open field. The notable section of the road is about 1,700 feet (520 m) in length, running roughly from Ballamahack Road in the west to Back Road in the east. The roadway is now paved, but the stone walls and views of countryside are much as it would have been in 1781-82.

The road is historically significant, because it formed part of the march route taken by French commander Rochambeau's French Army troops in 1781, on their way to Yorktown, Virginia, and also on the route of their return journey in 1782. On the return trip, the army established a camp in the field on the north side of this road section.

Multiple other properties whose association with Rochambeau's route is known have also been listed on the National Register.

== See also ==
- March Route of Rochambeau's army
- List of historic sites preserved along Rochambeau's route
- National Register of Historic Places listings in Windham County, Connecticut
