= Daniel Basset House =

Historic house in Connecticut, United States

- U.S. National Register of Historic Places
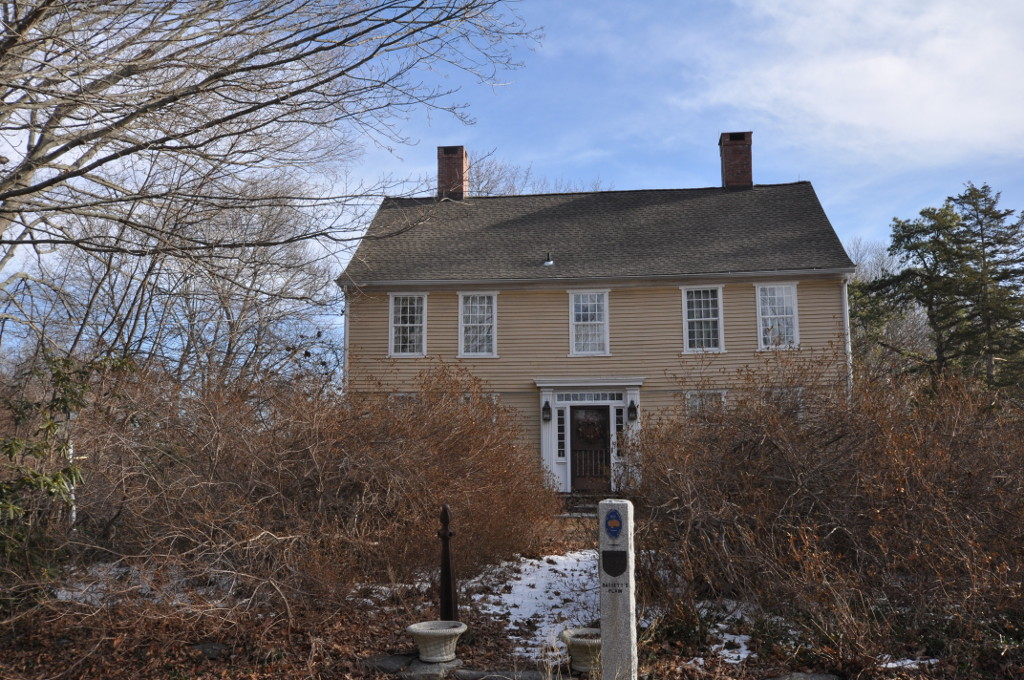

- Location within Connecticut Location within the United States
- Location: 1024 Monroe Turnpike, Monroe, Connecticut
- Coordinates: 41°20′58″N 73°11′53″W
- Area: 5.8 acres (2.3 ha)
- Built: 1775
- Architectural style: Colonial
- MPS: Rochambeau's Army in Connecticut, 1780-1782 MPS
- NRHP reference No.: 02000870
- Added to NRHP: August 23, 2002

The Daniel Basset House is a historic house at 1024 Monroe Turnpike in Monroe, Connecticut, built in 1775. It is significant for its association with events in the American Revolutionary War. It is documented to have hosted a ball for French officers of Lauzun's Legion on June 30, 1781; the legion had been encamped near the village center of Monroe. The house was listed on the National Register of Historic Places in 2002.

== Description and history ==
The Daniel Basset House is located northeast of the village center of Monroe on the east side of Monroe Turnpike in front of Masuk High School. It is a 2 1/2-story wood-frame structure set on almost 6 acres (2.4 ha) of land, five bays wide, with two brick chimneys and a side gable roof. Its centered entrance is flanked by sidelight windows and pilasters, and topped by a transom window. The second floor extends slightly over the first floor on the front façade. The interior follows a central hall plan. A key feature is a large chamber on the second floor which likely served as a ballroom.

The house was built in 1775. In the summer of 1781, the French army marched through Connecticut led by the comte de Rochambeau on their way to Virginia and the eventual Siege of Yorktown. The bulk of Rochambeau's army took an east–west route which passed north of Monroe, eventually encamping at Newtown and then marching through Ridgefield toward New York. Rochambeau detached Lauzun's Legion, a cavalry regiment, to parallel the army's march some 10–15 miles (16–24 km) to the south. This unit camped near the village center of Monroe on June 30. That evening, a ball was held in this house in honor of the French forces. It was the last entertainment for the troops, as they needed to be on heightened alert as they approached British-held New York City.

== See also ==
- March Route of Rochambeau's army
- List of historic sites preserved along Rochambeau's route
- National Register of Historic Places listings in Fairfield County, Connecticut
