= John Fell (judge) =

American politician

- Born: February 5, 1721; New York City
- Died: 1798 (aged 76–77)
- Occupations: Judge; politician; merchant

John Fell (February 5, 1721 – 1798) was an American merchant and jurist. Born in New York City, he was engaged in overseas trade and had acquired a small fleet of ships by the time he moved to Bergen County, New Jersey, in the 1760s, and lived at "Peterfield", a home in present-day Allendale, New Jersey that has become known as the "John Fell House". He served as judge of the court of common pleas in Bergen County from 1766 to 1774. With the coming of the American Revolutionary War, he became chairman of Bergen County's committee of correspondence and the committee of safety. He was Bergen County's leading delegate to the Provincial Congress of New Jersey in 1775. In 1776 Fell was elected to a one-year term in the New Jersey Legislative Council representing Bergen County.

In 1777, Fell, who had been imprisoned by the British, was released to a private apartment thanks to a letter written on his behalf by Ethan Allen.

The John Fell House, also known as Peterfield, is located at 475 Franklin Turnpike (41.032790°N 74.127156°W) in Allendale, New Jersey. The house is located on the march route of Rochambeau's army, on its way in 1781 to Yorktown, Virginia, and the Siege of Yorktown that would decide the American Revolutionary War.

== See also ==
- List of historic sites preserved along Rochambeau's route

== Sources ==
- United States Congress. "John Fell (id: F000065)". Biographical Directory of the United States Congress.
- Purcell, L. Edward. Who Was Who in the American Revolution. New York: Facts on File, 1993. ISBN 0-8160-2107-4.
