= March Route of Rochambeau's Army: Reservoir Road =

- U.S. National Register of Historic Places
- U.S. Historic district
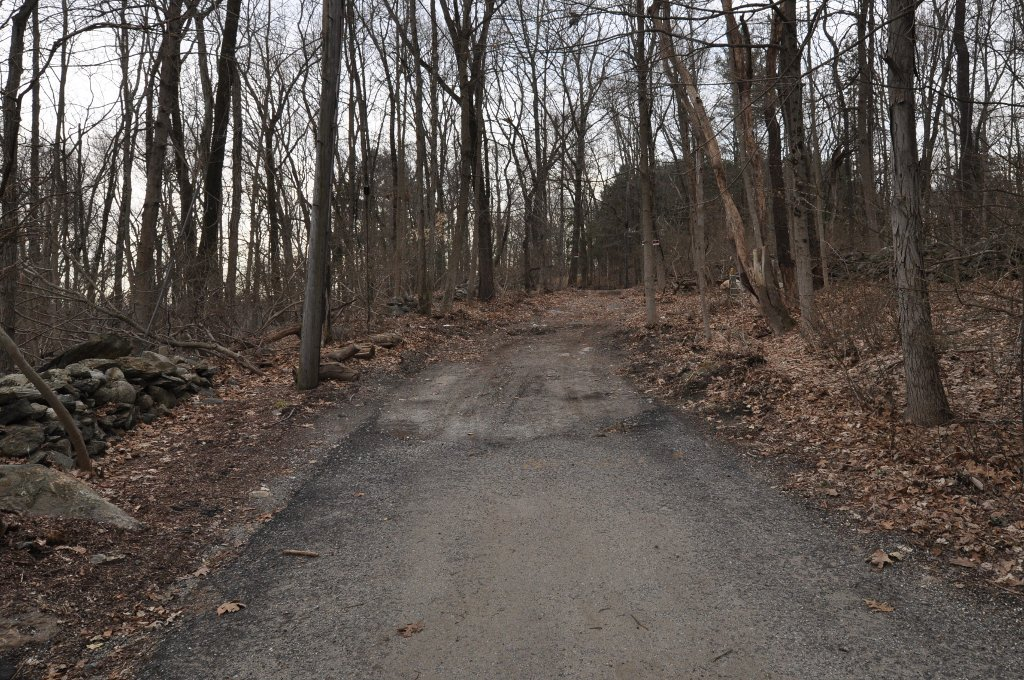
- Reservoir Road

- Location within Connecticut Location within the United States
- Location: Junction of Reservoir Road and Mount Pleasant Road South, Newtown, Connecticut
- Coordinates: 41°24′48″N 73°19′23″W
- Area: < 1 acre (0.40 ha)
- Built: 1781
- MPS: Rochambeau's Army in Connecticut, 1780-1782 MPS
- NRHP reference No.: 02001679
- Added to NRHP: January 8, 2003

March Route of Rochambeau's Army: Reservoir Road is a historic site in Newtown, Connecticut. It was listed on the National Register of Historic Places in 2003. It is along the march route taken by French Army troops under General Rochambeau in 1781.

The listed site is less than 1 acre (0.40 ha) in area and consists of a section of Reservoir Road running between stone walls which is believed to be the roadway taken by Rochambeau's army. It is an undeveloped property.

== See also ==
- March Route of Rochambeau's army
- List of historic sites preserved along Rochambeau's route
