= March Route of Rochambeau's Army: Palmer Road =

- U.S. National Register of Historic Places
- U.S. Historic district
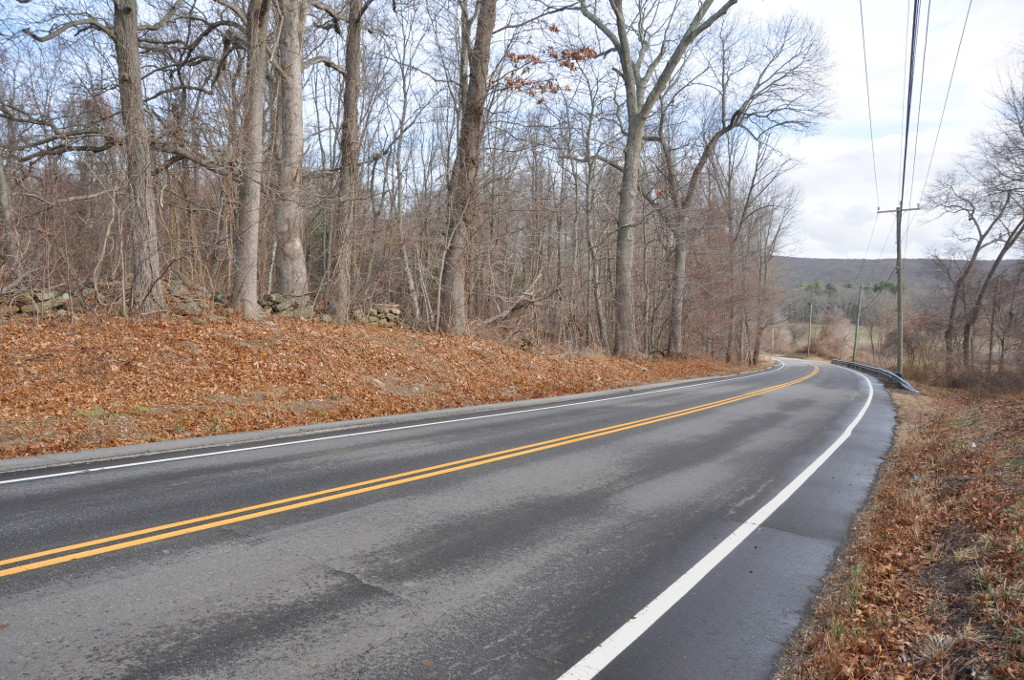
- Palmer Road in 2016

- Location within Connecticut Location within the United States
- Location: Palmer Road, from Intersection with Miller Road to East of Junction with Pudding Hill Road, Scotland, Connecticut
- Coordinates: 41°41′57″N 72°3′47″W
- Area: 2.6 acres (1.1 ha)
- MPS: Rochambeau's Army in Connecticut, 1780-1782 MPS
- NRHP reference No.: 03000311

Significant dates
- Dates of significance: 1781, 1782
- Added to NRHP: June 6, 2003

The March Route of Rochambeau's Army: Palmer Road is a linear historic district encompassing a portion of Connecticut Route 14 (Palmer Road) in eastern Scotland, Connecticut. It was listed on the National Register of Historic Places in 2003 as an evocative surviving element of the march route of the French Army commanded by Rochambeau during the American Revolutionary War in 1781 and 1782.

== Description and history ==
Connecticut Route 14 is a historically major east-west route through central eastern Connecticut, passing through the village Scotland between Canterbury and Windham. At the time of the American Revolutionary War Scotland was still a part of Windham, becoming a separate town in 1857. This road, then in places little more than an unpaved track, was the route taken by French commander Rochambeau's troops in 1781 and again during their return march in 1782 between Providence, Rhode Island and Yorktown, Virginia. French chroniclers of the march described the portion east of Scotland as a narrow, steep, stony road, and their baggage wagons arrived late at their camp in Windham on the westward march in 1781.

The historic element of the road runs about 2,000 feet (610 m) along Route 14 from its intersection with Miller Road east to a point 800 feet (240 m) east of the junction with Pudding Hill Road. The road is now a modern paved two-lane road, but its characteristics are very much as described by the French in 1781, rising steadily and sometimes steeply. Typical New England fieldstone walls line significant portions of the road, another feature commented on by French chroniclers. Views from the road are across hundreds of acres of farmland, lined by stone walls and trees, again very typical of the march period.

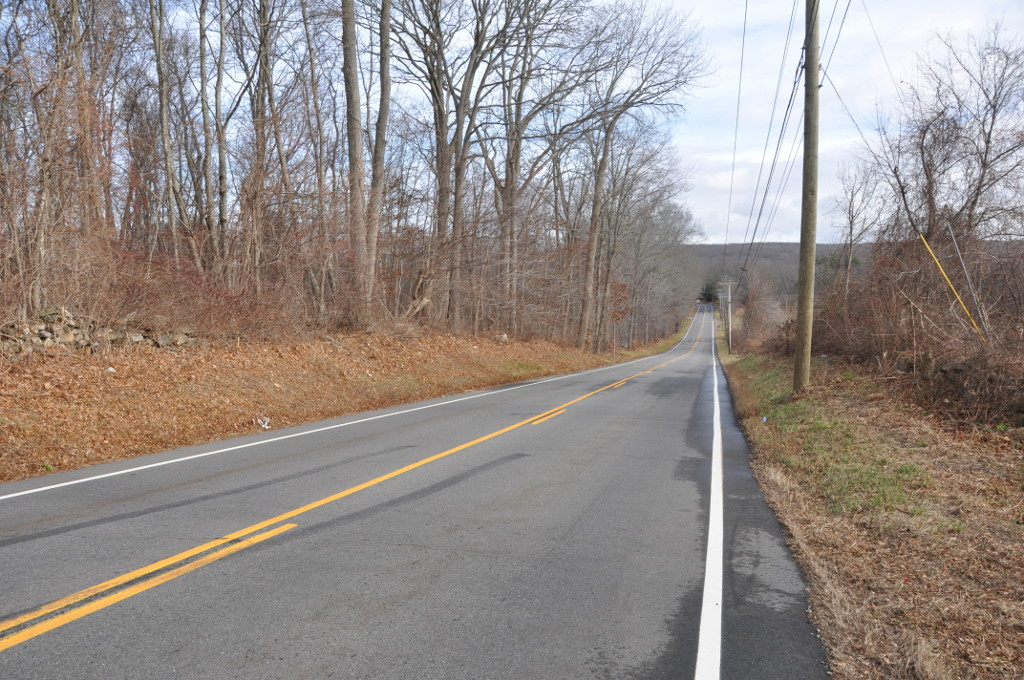
Another stretch of Palmer Road, in 2016

To the east about 3 miles (4.8 km) along Route 14 is another preserved section of the march route, a 1,400-foot (430 m) stretch along a bypass of Route 14. Multiple other properties whose association with Rochambeau's route is known were also considered for listing on the National Register in a study.

== See also ==
- March Route of Rochambeau's army
- List of historic sites preserved along Rochambeau's route
- National Register of Historic Places listings in Windham County, Connecticut
