= Doremus House =

Doremus House may refer to:

- Doremus House (Bevans, New Jersey), part of the NRHP-listed Peters Valley Historic District
- Doremus House (Hackensack, New Jersey), listed on the National Register of Historic Places in Bergen County, New Jersey
- Cornelius Doremus House, Montville, New Jersey, listed on the National Register of Historic Places in Morris County, New Jersey as the Parsonage of the Montville Reformed Dutch Church
- Henry Doremus House, Towaco, New Jersey, listed on the National Register of Historic Places in Morris County, New Jersey
