= March Route of Rochambeau's Army: Old Canterbury Road =

- U.S. National Register of Historic Places
- U.S. Historic district
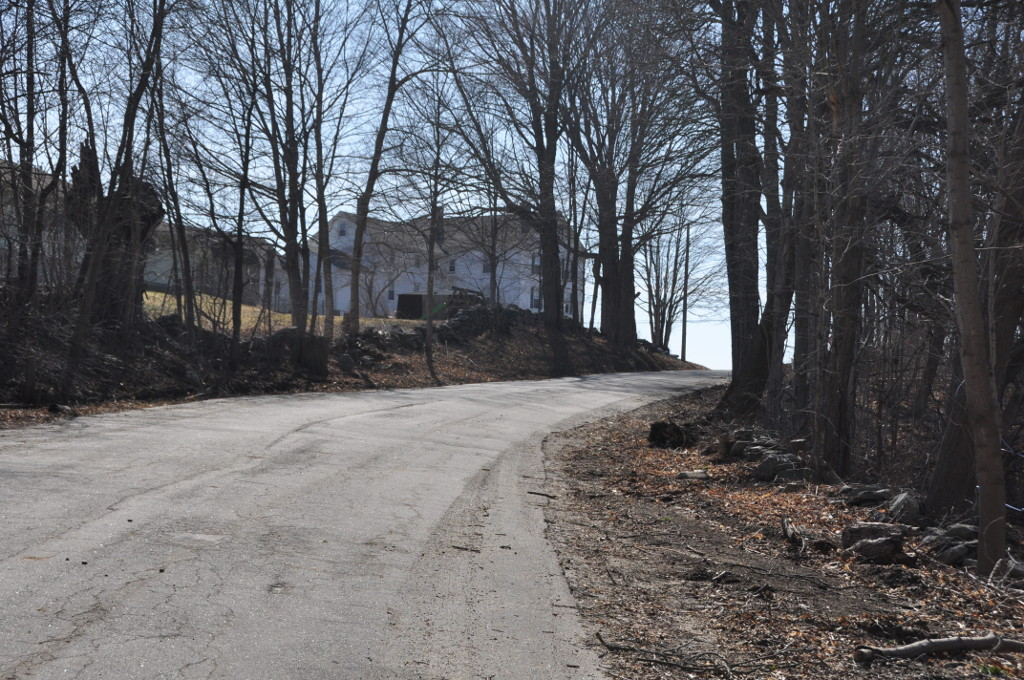
- Old Canterbury Road in 2016

- Location within Connecticut Location within the United States
- Location: Old Canterbury Road: Canterbury Road from Junction with Old Canterbury Road, Plainfield, Connecticut
- Coordinates: 41°41′22″N 71°57′4″W
- Area: 2 acres (0.81 ha)
- MPS: Rochambeau's Army in Connecticut, 1780-1782 MPS
- NRHP reference No.: 03000310

Significant dates
- Dates of significance: 1781, 1782
- Added to NRHP: June 6, 2003

March Route of Rochambeau's Army: Old Canterbury Road is a historic site in Plainfield, Connecticut along the 1781 and/or 1782 march routes of Rochambeau's army. It includes a stretch of what is now Old Canterbury Road and a stretch of Canterbury Road (Connecticut Route 14A) whose environs evoke the period of the Rochambeau army's march. It is a 2-acre (0.81 ha) site that was listed on the National Register of Historic Places in 2003.

== Description and history ==
The March Route of Rochambeau's Army: Old Canterbury Road is located in western Plainfield, along a portion of the current and historical alignment of Connecticut Route 14A. The eastern portion of the segment is part of the current alignment, extending eastward from the junction with Old Canterbury Road for about 1,300 feet (400 m). The western section of this segment consists of Old Canterbury Road, a narrow window paved road with a border of shrubs and vines and stone walls along much of its length; this was originally part of Route 14A until it was bypassed in the 1930s. A stand of mature sugar maple trees gives shade to a portion of the site. Houses along the section are more modern than the 1781-82 era, but are set back far enough so as not to interfere with the evocation of Rochambeau's marching troops.

This segment of road is one of many that was traversed by Rochambeau's troops in June 1781 on their way to Virginia, and again in November 1782, on their return to Rhode Island. The passage of the French army along this route is documented by period route map drawn by French military engineer Louis-Alexandre Berthier. French chroniclers of the march noted that it had "farms sown with rye and wheat, but especially with maize. . . and with potatoes", but that they also passed through "many woods, mostly of oaks and chestnut trees" in the area between their third camp (in Plainfield) and their fourth in Windham.

== See also ==
- March Route of Rochambeau's army
- List of historic sites preserved along Rochambeau's route
- National Register of Historic Places listings in Windham County, Connecticut
