= Forty-Seventh Camp of Rochambeau's Army =

- U.S. National Register of Historic Places
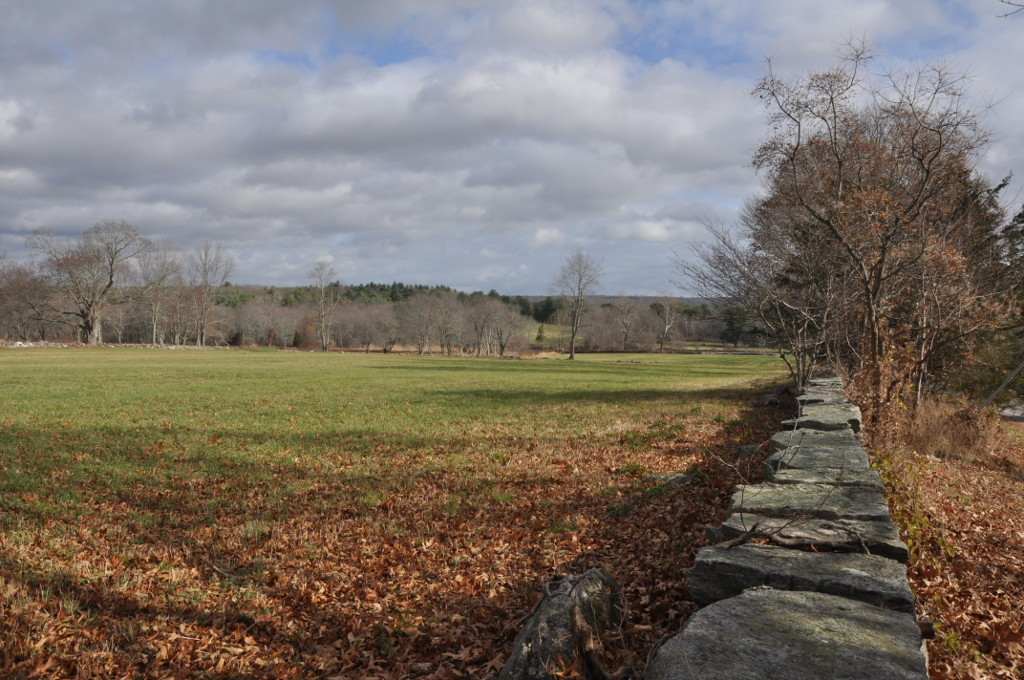
- Rochambeau Camp 47 site

- Location within Connecticut Location within the United States
- Location: Scotland Road, Windham, Connecticut
- Coordinates: 41°42′9″N 72°9′0″W
- Area: 15 acres (6.1 ha)
- Built: 1782
- MPS: Rochambeau's Army in Connecticut, 1780-1782 MPS
- NRHP reference No.: 02001732
- Added to NRHP: January 23, 2003

The Forty-Seventh Camp of Rochambeau's Army is a historic military camp site in Windham, Connecticut, located along Scotland Road a short way east of Windham Center. It was the site of a French Army camp in November 1782 on their march from the victory at Yorktown to Rhode Island. The camp site is considered of archaeological importance because it can shed light on transient military camp sites, whose locations are not often known. It was listed on the National Register of Historic Places in 2003.

== Description and history ==
Rochambeau's 47th camp was, according to a map prepared by a French military engineer, located on both sides of Scotland Road, between Ballamahack Road and Middle Hill Road, east of the village center of Windham. The modern roadway, designated Connecticut Route 14, is one of the most evocative sections of the army's march route in terms if its landscape, and is also listed on the National Register. The site occupied by the army is about 15 acres (6.1 ha) in size, with the street-facing sections lined with stone walls.

When the French Army marched west from Providence to the area outside New York City in 1781, its chosen site in Windham was the fourth camp, and was located west of Windham Center on the banks of the Shetucket River. French diarists described the route west of Windham as being particularly difficult. An enlisted man in the first brigade recounted having a rest day at this site on the return march, where they were joined by the second brigade "in frightful weather".

== See also ==
- March Route of Rochambeau's army
- List of historic sites preserved along Rochambeau's route
- National Register of Historic Places listings in Windham County, Connecticut
