= List of historic sites preserved along Rochambeau's route =

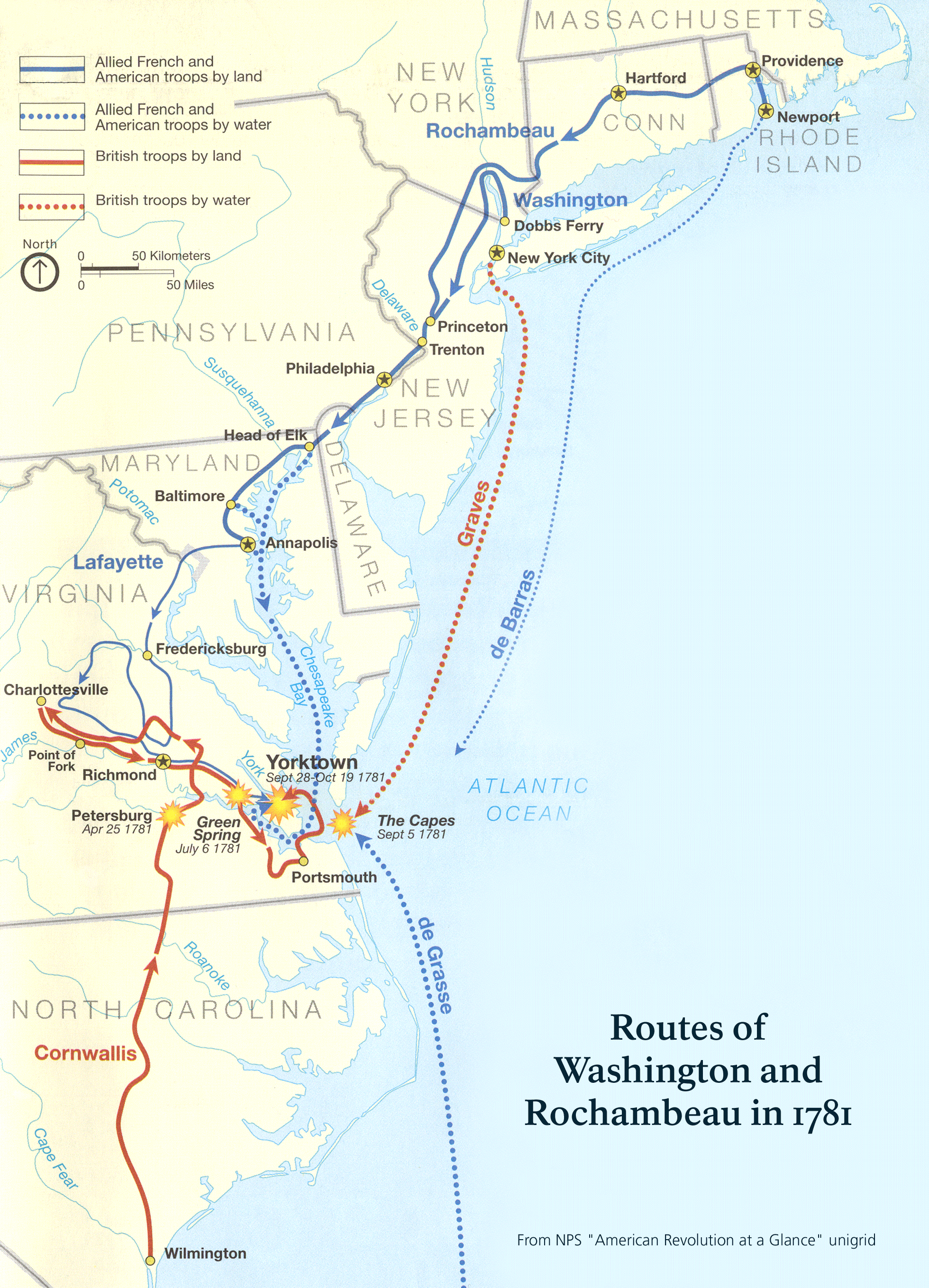
National Park Service map of the Washington–Rochambeau Revolutionary Route

A series of sites along the Washington–Rochambeau Revolutionary Route have been listed on the U.S. National Register of Historic Places or otherwise recognized and preserved. Buildings or roadway or other artifacts at these sites have been preserved and still evoke the army's passage in 1781 and its return in 1782. A multiple-property documentation study completed in 2001 addressed many of the Connecticut sites, and outlined criteria for NRHP-eligibility of others.

== List of historic sites ==
Recognized historic sites include, from East to West:

- University Hall (41°49′34″N 71°24′14″W), Providence, Rhode Island. (1st camp was Providence)
- Waterman's Tavern (2nd camp) (41°43′10″N 71°39′35″W), Coventry, Rhode Island
- Dorrance Inn (41°41′28″N 71°50′48″W), Sterling, Connecticut
- Sterling Hill Historic District (41°41′23″N 71°50′56″W)
- March Route of Rochambeau's Army: Plainfield Pike (41°40′54″N 71°51′50″W) is a 3.6-mile-long road segment in Plainfield and Sterling, Connecticut that is a portion of the historic march route. It was listed on the National Register of Historic Places in 2003. It is a portion of Connecticut Route 14A, locally known as Plainfield Pike, which is level in the eastern part but generally hilly with curves. Along the route is open land including pasture and cornfields, wooded areas, and streams including Ekonk Brook. It is bordered by stone walls about 50 feet apart on both sides for most of the way. The only concentration of houses as of 2002 was of 18th- and 19th-century homes in the Sterling Hill Historic District. The roadway was poor and caused difficulty for the artillery and baggage trains. The segment includes views of countryside evocative of how the land would have been in 1781 for the troops marching through.
- March Route of Rochambeau's Army: Old Canterbury Road (41°41′22″N 71°57′4″W) is a historic site in Plainfield, Connecticut along the march route of Rochambeau's army. It includes a stretch of what is now Old Canterbury Road and a stretch of Canterbury Road (Connecticut Route 14A). It is a 2-acre (0.81 ha) site that was listed on the National Register of Historic Places in 2003. This particular segment of the route was deemed historically significant in 2002 "because it allows one to imagine the appearance of the Connecticut countryside—the cultivated fields, woods, stone walls, and narrow, windy roads—that the French army encountered as it made its way to and from the Battle of Yorktown, the engagement that decided the outcome of the American Revolution". It was traversed by Rochambeau's troops in June 1781 on their way to Virginia, and again in November 1782 on their return to Rhode Island. Part of the site is a narrow, curving paved road with a border of shrubs and vines and stone walls along much of its length. A stand of mature sugar maple trees gives shade to a portion of the site. Houses along the section are more modern than the 1781-82 era but are set back far enough to not interfere with the evocation of Rochambeau's marching troops. At the east end of the segment, stone walls are preserved on both sides of the road, and "there are expansive views of plowed fields and pasture both to the north and to the south" as of 2002. The passage of the French army along this route is documented by a period route map drawn by French military engineer Louis-Alexandre Berthier, republished by Rice and Brown in 1972 and reproduced in the 2002 NRHP nomination document.

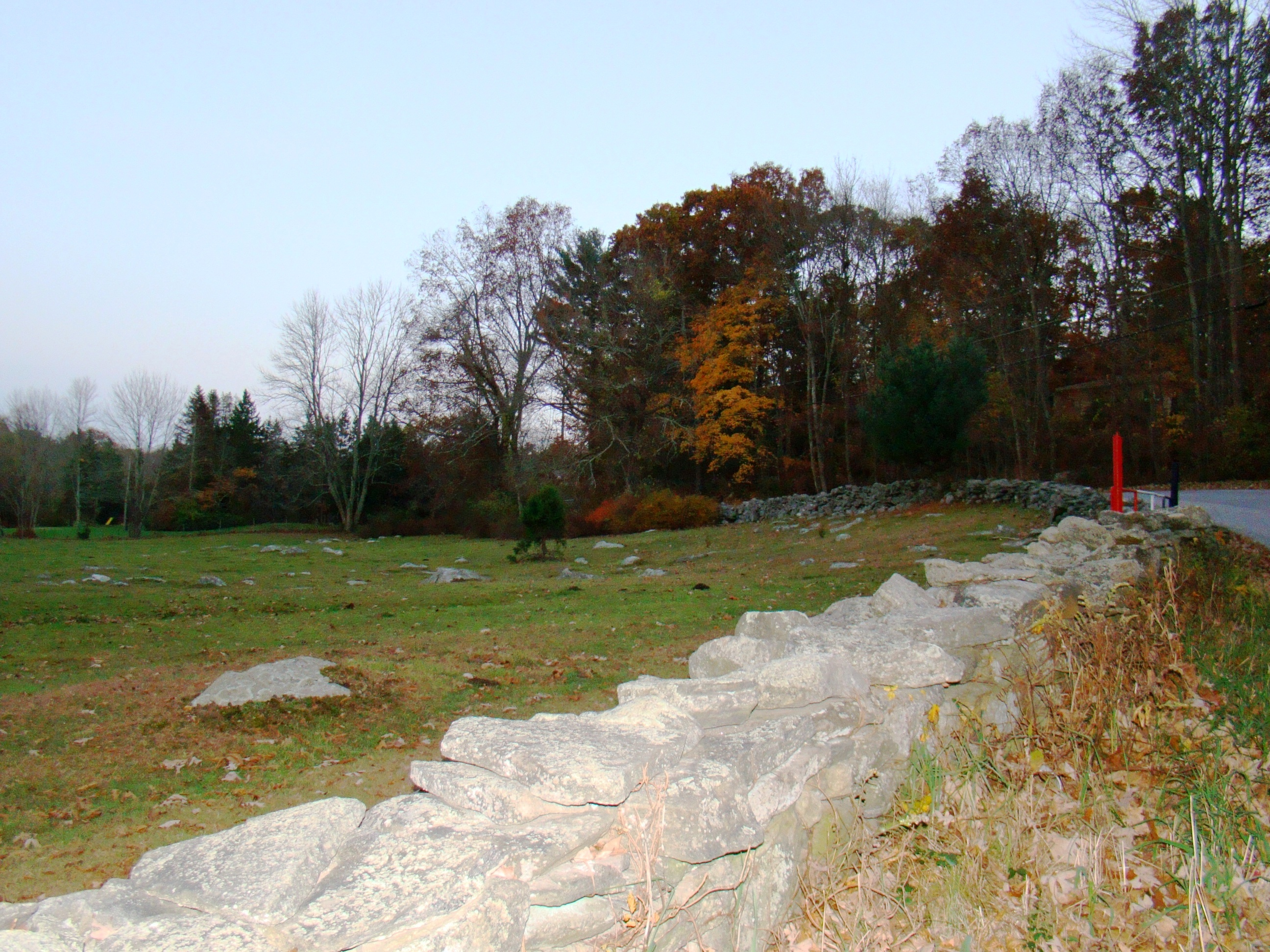
Manship and Barstow Roads junction

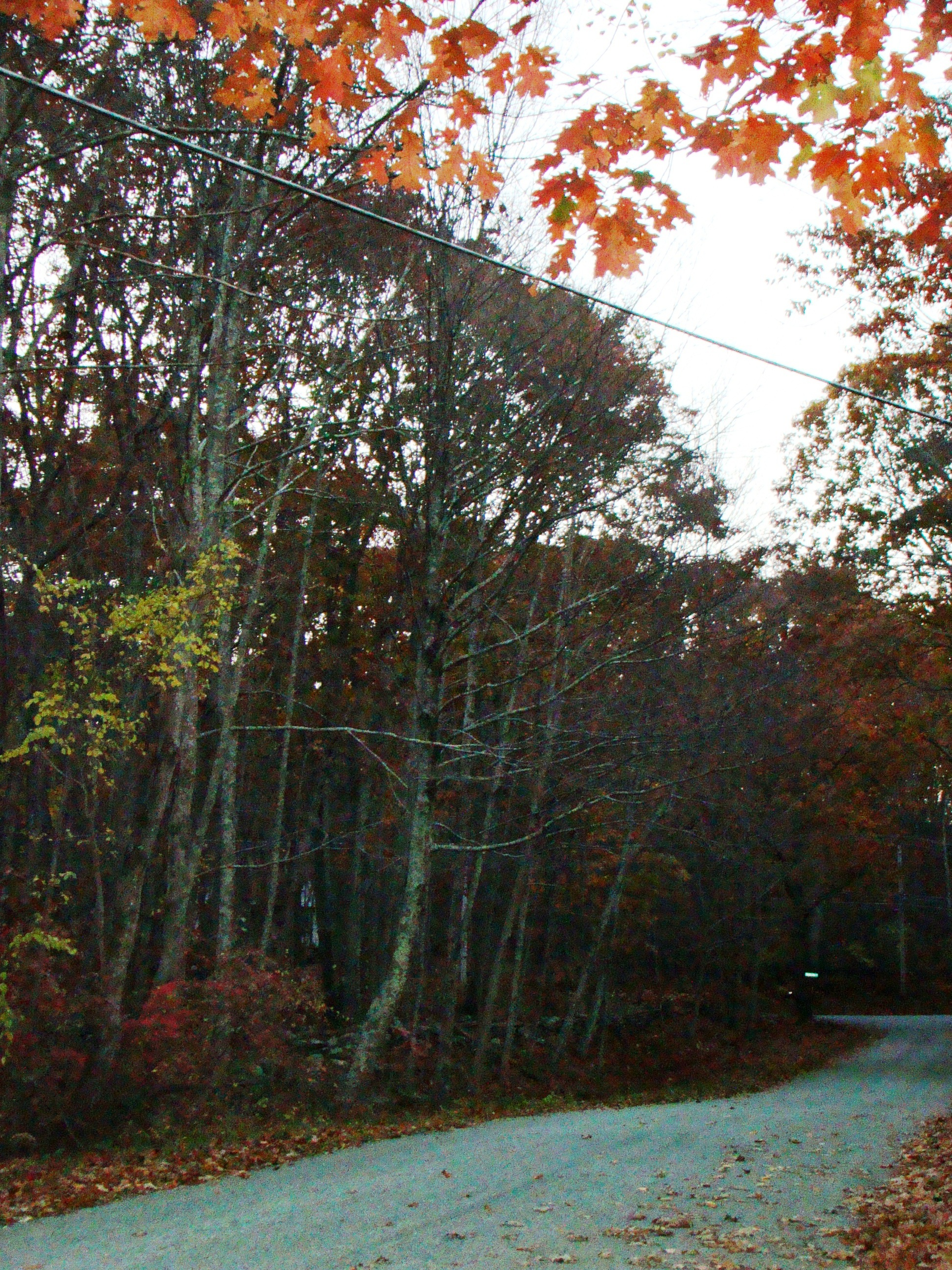
Barstow Road to Westminster Road

- March Route of Rochambeau's Army: Manship Road-Barstow Road (41°42′7″N 72°0′13″W) is part of the march route in Canterbury, Connecticut that was listed on the National Register of Historic Places in 2003. It is significant as a preserved section of the march route which is followed in this area by Connecticut Route 14. This section, however, is a bypassed loop of road, cut off by a road realignment in the 1930s, and therefore without traffic and not modernized. The section is approximately 1,400 feet of bypassed loop of road on the north side of the main road along Manship Road and Barstow Road, starting from a junction of the loop with Manship Road and running to Westminster Road. It is paved road about 20 feet wide, plus a margin to stone walls lining the road. The designated area is about 50 to 55 feet wide, extending to the walls. The National Register nomination of 2001 includes six photos of narrow roadway, stone walls, and the one house along this section. The house is also historical, dating from about the 1840s, and adds to rather than detracting from the historical feel. Rochambeau's troops marched through here in June 1781 and found the road along this general area to be the most difficult along their whole journey. The road has been paved but the visual appearance is still evocative of the historical period.
- March Route of Rochambeau's Army: Palmer Road (41°41′57″N 72°3′47″W) is the section of Palmer Road from the intersection with Miller Road east to a point 800 feet from the junction with Pudding Hill Road in Scotland, Connecticut. It was listed on the National Register of Historic Places in 2003. It was a narrow, steep, stony road then, but now it has expansive views of farmland. The French troops with artillery and wagons reportedly found the marching difficult in this segment, though easier after the hill. It was reportedly viewed by the French as "a narrow, steep, and stony road" in this segment (per Rice and Brown, 1972, p. 23, cited in NRHP document). The modern road is paved, but its hilly, winding nature and remnants of stone walls and other elements evoke the experience of the French troops in this section.
- March Route of Rochambeau's Army: Scotland Road (41°42′3″N 72°8′43″W) is along Scotland Road from the intersection with Back Road to 80 Scotland Road in Windham, Connecticut, approximately 1,700 feet long and a portion of Connecticut Route 14. It was listed on the National Register of Historic Places in 2003. The roadway is modern, but the stone walls and views of countryside are much as they would have been in 1781-82.
- Fourth Camp of Rochambeau's Army, Windham, Connecticut
- Forty-Seventh Camp of Rochambeau's Army (41°42′9″N 72°9′0″W), Windham, Connecticut, used on return in 1782 instead of site of 4th camp, also in Windham.
- William Williams House (41°38′9.8″N 72°12′46″W) in Lebanon, Connecticut, National Historic Landmark home of a signer of the Declaration of Independence
- Governor Jonathan Trumbull's War Office (41°38′13″N 72°12′55″W) in Lebanon, Connecticut, also known as the Joseph Trumble Office and Store, which was the most important Revolutionary War-associated building in Connecticut
- John Trumbull Birthplace (41°38′10″N 72°12′56″W), Lebanon, Connecticut
- White's Tavern (41°45′12″N 72°23′51″W), Andover, Connecticut

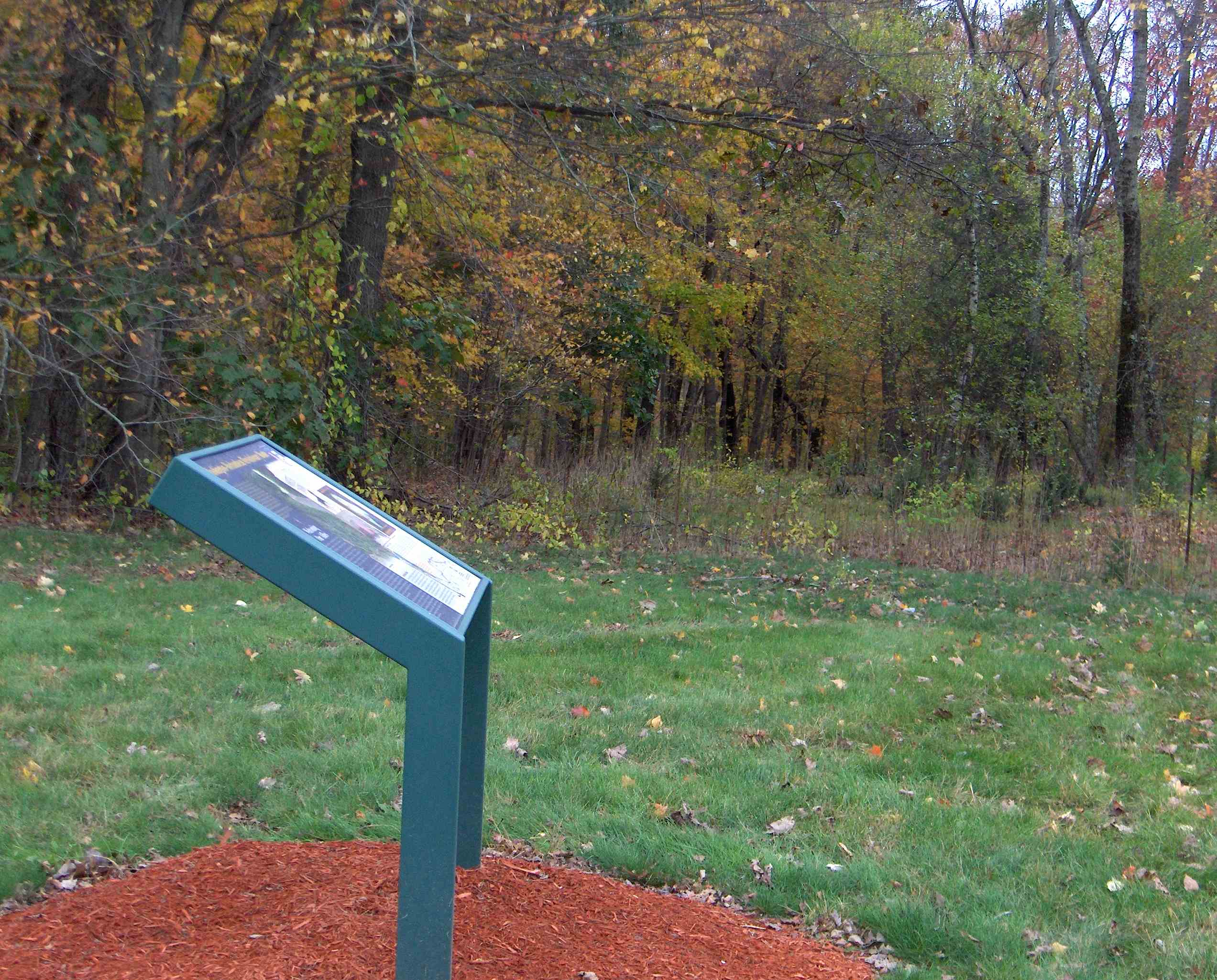
Bailey Road marker

- March Route of Rochambeau's Army: Hutchinson Road (41°45′26.2″N 72°23′58.9″W) is a 2-acre (0.81 ha) historic site in Andover, Connecticut along the 1781-82 march route of Rochambeau's army. It was listed on the National Register of Historic Places in 2002. It is primarily a section of roadway and includes White's Tavern.
- March Route of Rochambeau's Army: Bailey Road (41°45′44″N 72°24′49″W) is a section of abandoned old roadway that is a historic site in Bolton, Connecticut. It was listed on the National Register of Historic Places in 2003. It is "the most intact and evocative section of Rochambeau's route." Bailey Road originally connected Route 6 with Brandy Street in Bolton but the portion west of the Andover-Bolton town line has since been overgrown and is no longer passable by motor vehicles. A remnant of Bailey Road in Bolton still exists as an unpaved footpath and still retains the characteristic stone walls, as well as two original stone culverts.
- Fifth Camp of Rochambeau's Infantry (41°46′13.6″N 72°25′39.8″W), also known as Site 12-25, is an archeological site in Bolton, Connecticut that is related to the 1781 campsite of Rochambeau's army. It is a 13-acre (5.3 ha) site that was listed on the National Register of Historic Places in 2001, listed for its information potential. According to a study completed in 2001, it "is an open field that retains its visual qualities, with stone walls marking the same field lines as shown on the map prepared by the French engineers. The camp was occupied for four nights in a row, one night by each regiment, in June, 1781. A large number of artifacts have been recovered to date, including numbered regimental buttons, .66 caliber musket balls, period coins, and a lead bar."
- Joseph Webb House (41°42′41.6″N 72°39′13.4″W), Wethersfield, Connecticut where George Washington and Rochambeau met in 1781 to plan the campaign
- Levi B. Frost House (41°34′5″N 72°55′29″W) also known as Asa Barnes Tavern in the 1780s, in Southington, Connecticut
- Marion Historic District (41°33′50″N 72°55′29″W), eighth camp in 1781, and also a camp on return in 1782, Southington, Connecticut
- Josiah Bronson House (41°32′51″N 73°7′29″W), Middlebury, Connecticut
- Daniel Basset House (41°20′58″N 73°11′53″W), Monroe, Connecticut, built in 1775, site of a ball held for the French officers of Lauzun's mounted section of Rochambeau's army on June 30, 1781, which camped nearby.
- Monroe Center Historic District (41°19′57″N 73°12′26″W), whose Monroe Center Green was site of a dance for 600 of Rochambeau's troops on June 30, 1781
- Camps Nos. 10 and 41 of Rochambeau's Army (41.414568°N 73.302366°W), also known as Site No. 97-87D, is an archeological site that was listed on the National Register of Historic Places in 2002. The listed site is 5-acre (2.0 ha) in area.
- Caleb Baldwin Tavern (41°24′46″N 73°18′31″W), Newtown, Connecticut
- Newtown Borough Historic District (41°24′43″N 73°18′32″W), Newtown, Connecticut
- March Route of Rochambeau's Army: Reservoir Road (41°24′48″N 73°19′23″W) is a historic site in Newtown, Connecticut. It was listed on the National Register of Historic Places in 2003. The listed site is less than 1 acre (0.40 ha) in area and comprises a section of Reservoir Road running between stone walls, which is believed to be the roadway taken by Rochambeau's army. It is an undeveloped property.
- March Route of Rochambeau's Army: Ridgebury Road (41°20′36″N 73°31′47″W) is a historic site in Ridgefield, Connecticut. It was listed on the National Register of Historic Places in 2003. It is a 1,600-foot section of the Ridgebury Road, and the defined property is about 50 feet wide, running from stone walls on either side. It is known with certainty to have been traversed by Rochambeau's army in 1781, and the current appearance in this section is much the same now as it was then.
- Odell House (41°1′10″N 73°49′4″W), Greenburgh, New York
- John Fell House (41.032790°N 74.127156°W), 475 Franklin Turnpike, Allendale, New Jersey. Home of John Fell (1721–1798), judge and member of the Continental Congress.
- Henry Doremus House (40°55′6″N 74°21′15″W) Historic Dutch stone house in Montville, New Jersey.
- Ford Mansion (40°47′47″N 74°28′00″W) Washington's Headquarters in Morristown, New Jersey, 1779–1780.
- Peter Kemble House (40°45′30″N 74°31′27″W) Home of Peter Kemble near Morristown, New Jersey.
- Old Oak Tree at Presbyterian Church in Basking Ridge (40°42′26″N 74°32′39″W) 600 year-old oak tree in church yard overlooked Rochambeau's troops marching past. The church building standing then has been replaced by an 1839-built Greek Revival church, also historical, but the church yard and tree of 1781 survive. In Basking Ridge, New Jersey.

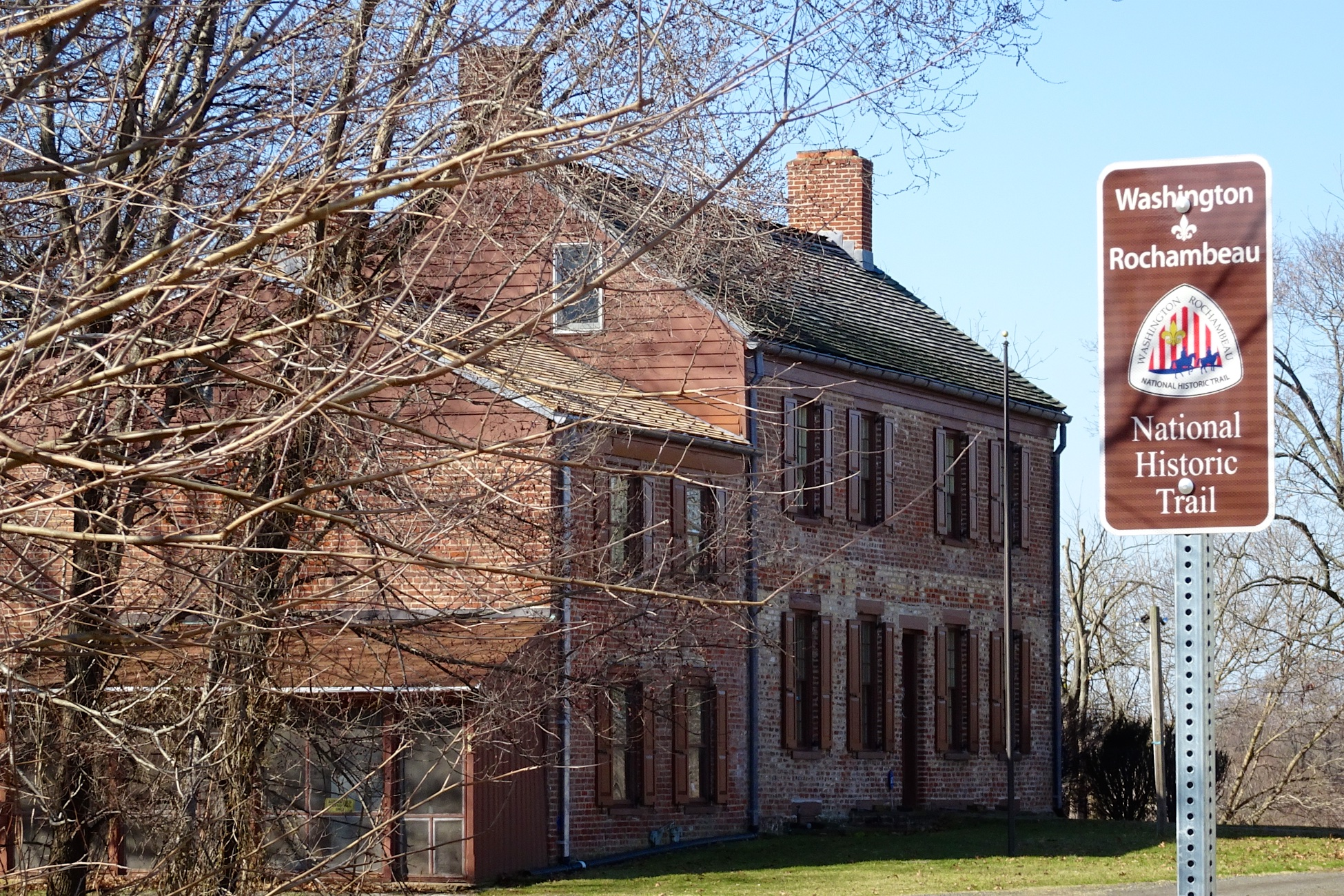
Van Veghten House, Finderne, New Jersey, 2018

- Van Veghten House (40°33′25″N 74°35′18″W) The Van Veghten House in Finderne, New Jersey was also the headquarters of Quartermaster General Nathanael Greene during the second Middlebrook encampment (winter of 1778–79).
- Alexandria camp: The camp of the wagon train of Rochambeau's army in Alexandria, Virginia is commemorated by a historic plaque at 609 Oronoco Street (38.80965°N 77.04575°W). Wagons were ferried across and down the Potomac River from Georgetown in Maryland (in what is now Washington, D.C.) to Alexandria during September 24 and 25, 1781, and the wagon train departed on September 26.
- Peyton's Ordinary: A commemorative marker at 2664 Jefferson Davis Highway, Stafford, Virginia (38.45191°N 77.40439°W) identifies where Rochambeau's army camped one night in 1782 when marching north from Williamsburg.
- Yorktown Battlefield / Colonial National Historical Park

== Gallery ==
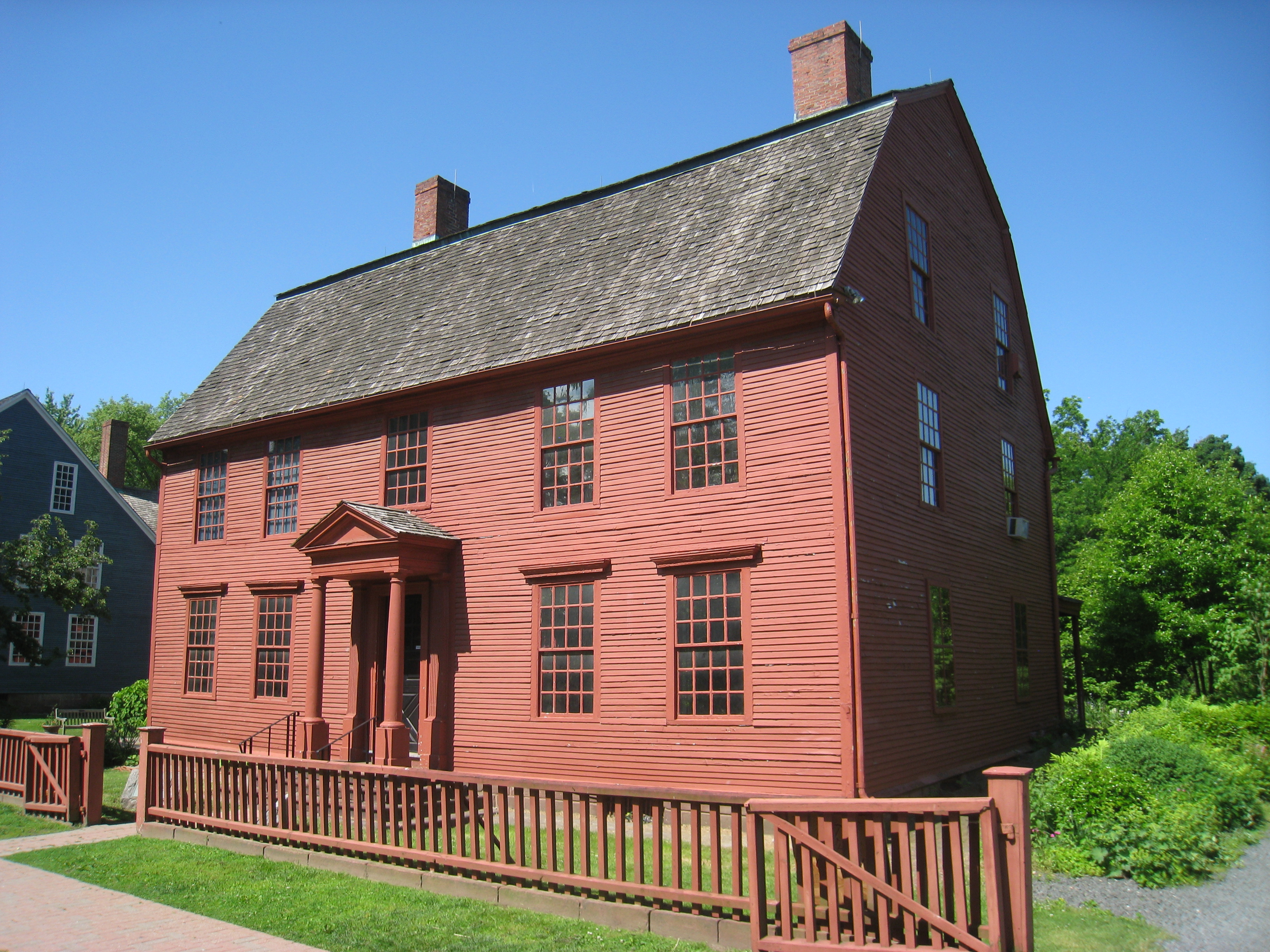
Joseph Webb House in Wethersfield, Connecticut, in 2009

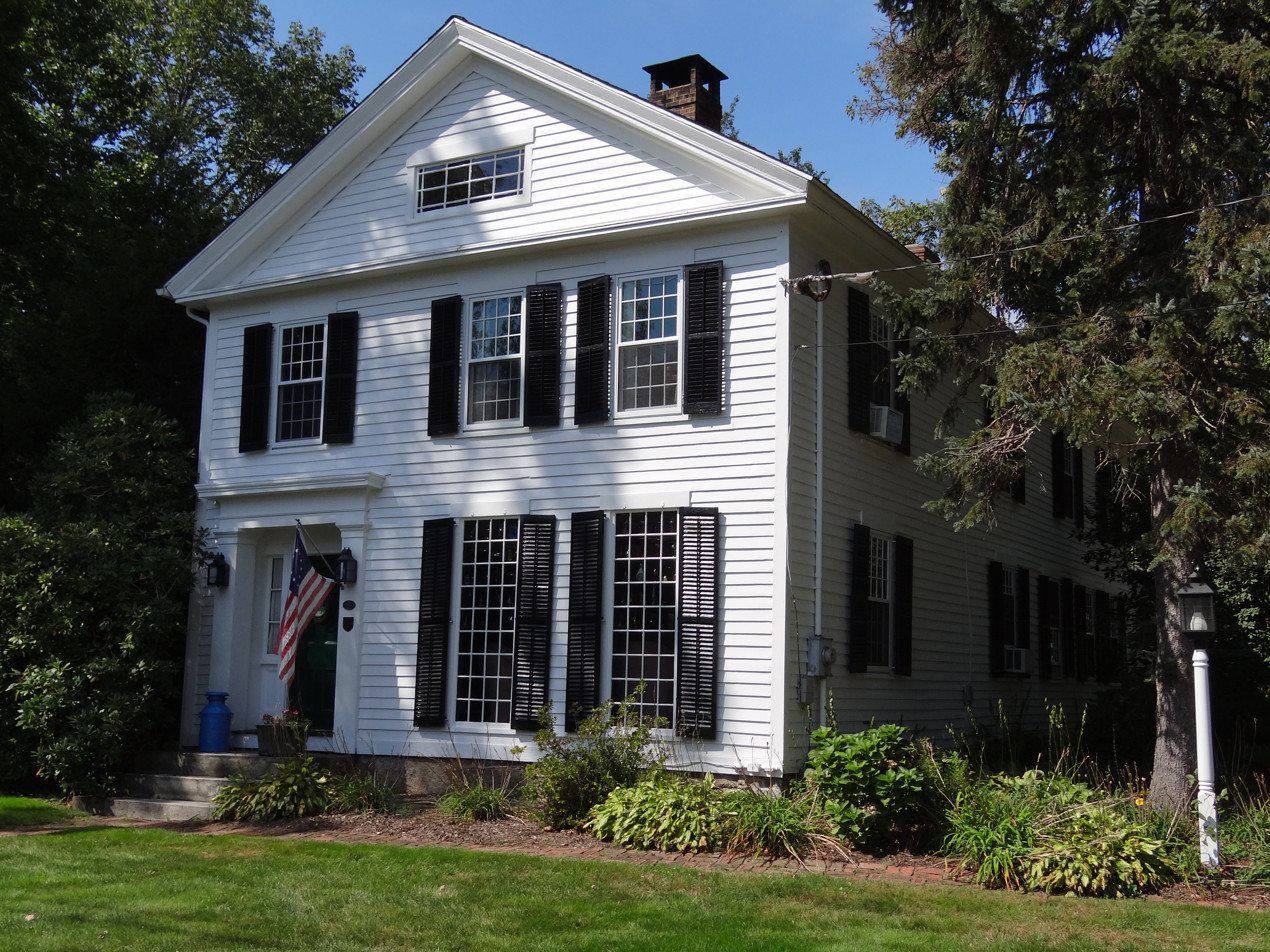
Asa Barnes Tavern/Levi B. Frost House in Southington, Connecticut, in 2011

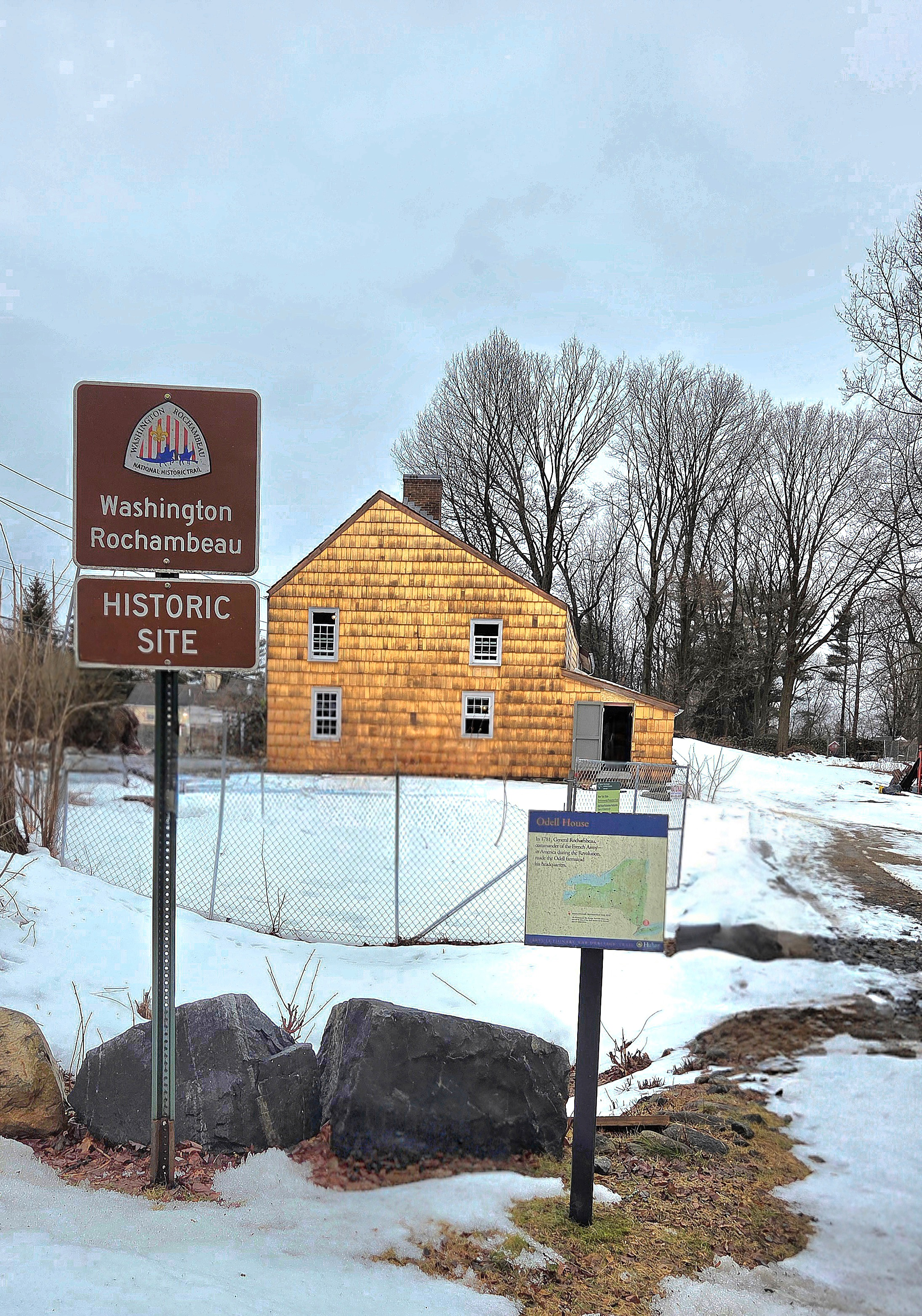
Odell House in Hartsdale, New York, in 2026
