= March Route of Rochambeau's Army: Ridgebury Road =

- U.S. National Register of Historic Places
- U.S. Historic district
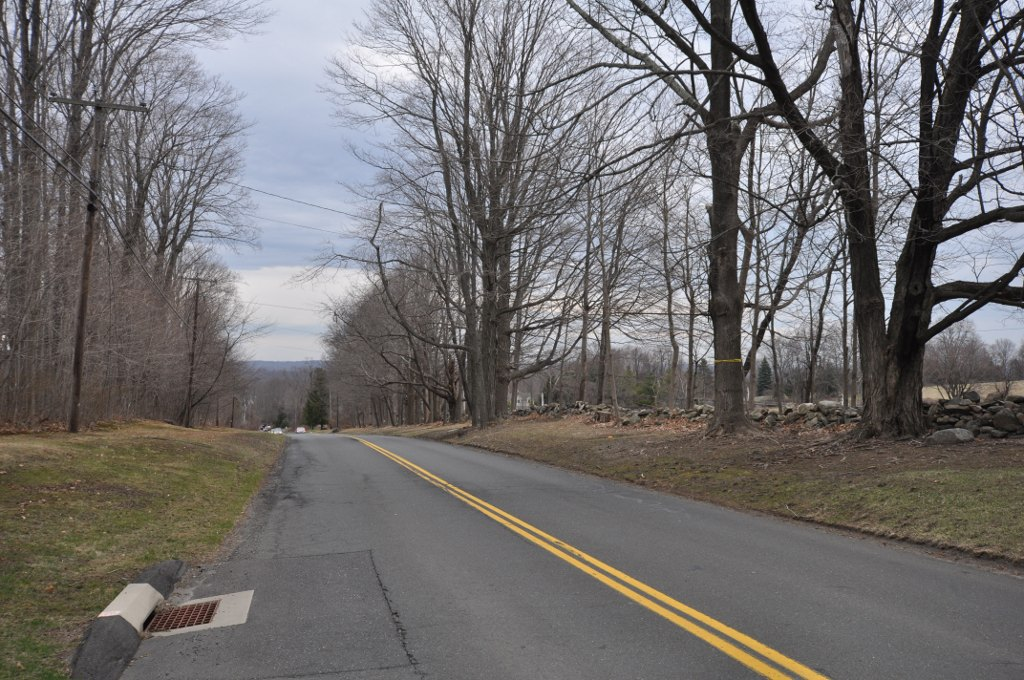
- Ridgebury Road in 2016

- Location within Connecticut Location within the United States
- Location: Ridgebury Road, from Intersection with Old Stagecoach South, Ridgefield, Connecticut
- Coordinates: 41°20′36″N 73°31′47″W
- Area: 2 acres (0.81 ha)
- Built: 1781
- MPS: Rochambeau's Army in Connecticut, 1780-1782 MPS
- NRHP reference No.: 03000313
- Added to NRHP: June 6, 2003

March Route of Rochambeau's Army: Ridgebury Road is a historic site in Ridgefield, Connecticut. It was listed on the National Register of Historic Places in 2003. It is along the march route taken by French Army troops under General Rochambeau in 1781. It is a 1,600-foot section of the Ridgebury Road; the defined property is about 50 feet wide with stone walls on either side. It was travelled by Rochambeau's army in 1781, and the current appearance in this section is much the same now as it was then.

== See also ==
- March Route of Rochambeau's army
- List of historic sites preserved along Rochambeau's route
