= Odell House =

Historic house in New York, United States

- Odell House Rochambeau Headquarters
- U.S. National Register of Historic Places
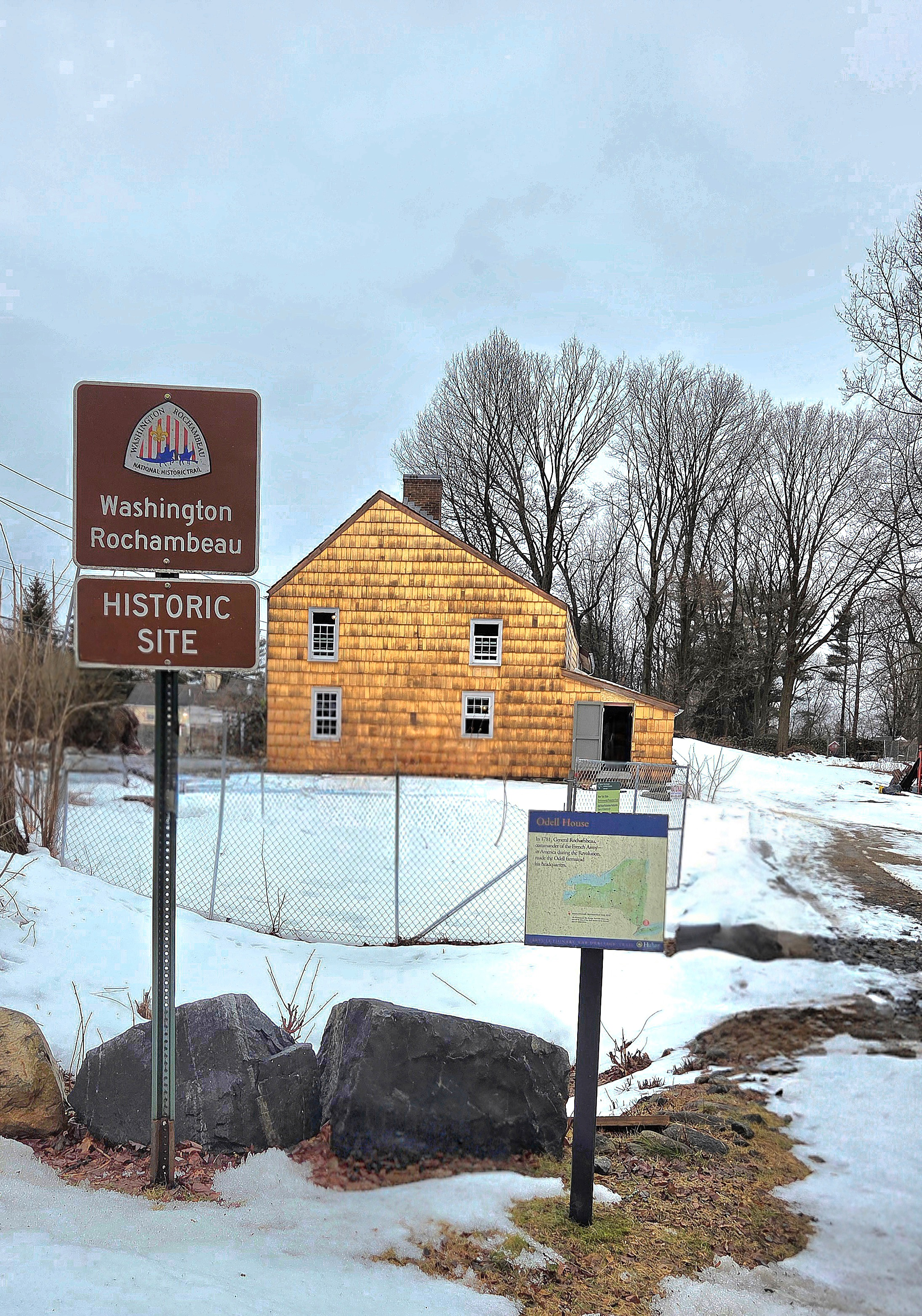

- Location within New York
- Location: 425 Ridge Road, Greenburgh, New York, United States
- Coordinates: 41°1′10″N 73°49′4″W
- Area: 1 acre (0.40 hectares)
- Built: 1732
- Website: https://www.odellrochambeau.org/
- NRHP reference No.: 73001286
- Added to NRHP: March 28, 1973 (53 years ago)

The Odell House is a historic house museum located at 425 Ridge Road in Hartsdale, Westchester County, New York. The house and surrounding farmland (at the time known as the Bates farm) served as the headquarters of Comte de Rochambeau and campsite for the French expeditionary forces, Expédition Particulière, under his command during the American Revolutionary War, from July 6 to August 18, 1781.

While Rochambeau and his forces were camped at the Bates farm, General George Washington and the Continental Army camped nearby at the Appleby Farm (in present-day Ardsley). The combined campsite became known as the Philipsburg Encampment as it was situated on the land of the massive colonial landholding, Philipsburg Manor. The encampment stretched for miles from North Castle/Mount Kisco (east) to the Hudson River, and from the Croton River (north) toward White Plains and Dobbs Ferry. It was here that the French forces under Rochambeau and the American forces under Washington united for the first time during the war before launching the victorious Yorktown campaign.

The Odell House was added to the National Register of Historic Places in 1973. In 2026, it became a public museum, Odell House Rochambeau Headquarters, preserving the legacy of the Franco-American alliance in the Revolutionary War.

== Description and history ==
The house consists of a 1 1/2-story central section erected in 1732, with flanking wings. The east wing was built in 1765 as a 1 1/2-story structure and raised to a full two stories in 1785. The central section and east wing are of wood-frame construction, covered with cedar shingles, and rest on a fieldstone foundation. The two-story stone west wing was built between 1853 and 1855. The house features three divided Dutch doors.

The earliest part of the house, consisting of two rooms, was built by John Tompkins, one of the tenant farmers of Frederick Philipse III, the last lord of Philipsburg Manor. By 1760, he sold the house to another tenant farmer family, Gilbert and Sarah Bates, who added two more rooms. Gilbert became a soldier early in the Revolutionary War, was imprisoned by the British, and died in captivity. When the French troops marched into the area, the widow Bates offered her four-room house to Rochambeau to serve as his headquarters.

Among the first residents of Westchester to volunteer for the Westchester County Militia in 1776, John Odell became one of the elite Westchester guides and served as a scout for General Washington during the Philipsburg Encampment. He was later commissioned a Colonel in the New York State Militia by Governor John Jay. After the war, Colonel Odell purchased the house from the widow Bates.

In 2020, the house was deeded to the town of Greenburgh. The nonprofit group, Friends of Odell House Rochambeau Headquarters, worked with the town to restore the property and create a museum. Construction began in March 2021 and was completed in 2026. For her leadership in saving and restoring the house, Susan Seal, president of the Friends of Odell House, was named a Knight (Chevalier) in France's Ordre national du Mérite (National Order of Merit), which is the second-highest award given to civilians by the French government.

== See also ==
- List of historic houses
- List of historic sites preserved along Rochambeau's route
- National Register of Historic Places listings in southern Westchester County, New York
- Neutral Ground of Westchester County in the Revolutionary War
- Washington–Rochambeau Revolutionary Route
