= Samuel Huntington Birthplace =

Historic house in Connecticut, United States

- U.S. National Register of Historic Places
- U.S. National Historic Landmark
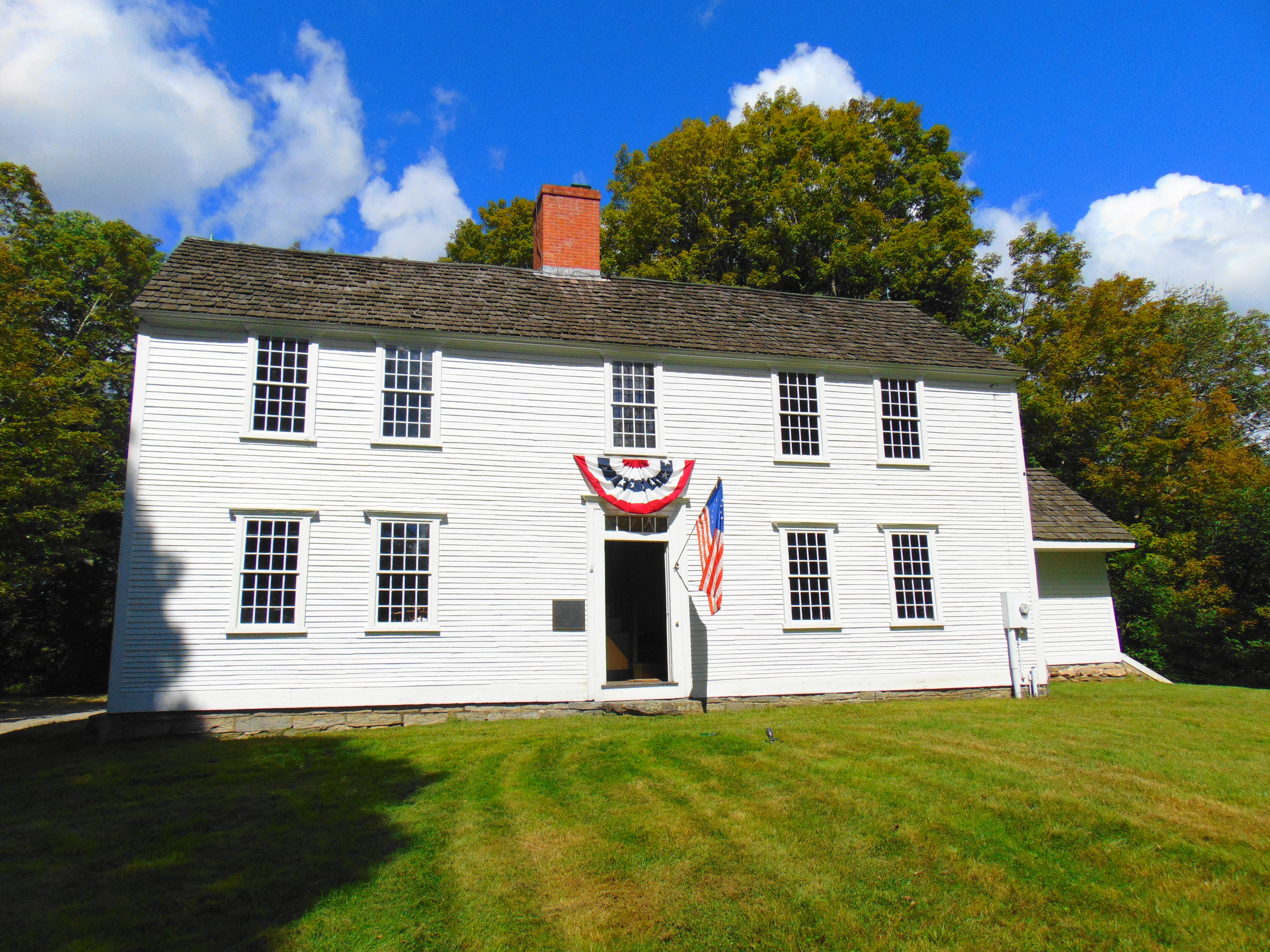
- Samuel Huntington Birthplace c. 2018

- Location within Connecticut Location within the United States
- Location: Scotland, Connecticut
- Coordinates: 41°41′55″N 72°5′8″W
- Area: 32 acres (13 ha)
- Built: 1700–1722
- Architectural style: Saltbox colonial
- NRHP reference No.: 71001009

Significant dates
- Added to NRHP: November 11, 1971
- Designated NHL: November 11, 1971

The Huntington Homestead, also known as the Samuel Huntington Birthplace, is a historic house museum and National Historic Landmark at 36 Huntington Road (Connecticut Route 14) in Scotland, Connecticut. Built in the early 18th century, it was the birthplace and boyhood home of Samuel Huntington (1731–1796), an American statesman and Founding Father. He served as a delegate to the Continental Congress, where he signed the Declaration of Independence. He also served as Governor of Connecticut and was the first presiding officer of the Congress of the Confederation, the first central government of the United States of America.

== Description and history ==
The Huntington house is a 2½ story wood-frame structure, five bays wide, with a side gable roof and large central chimney. The roof at the rear of the house slopes down to the first floor, giving the house a classic New England saltbox appearance. A small kitchen wing was added to the east side of the house in the 19th century. The interior has a typical Georgian central-chimney plan, with a vestibule and narrow winding stair in front of the chimney, public rooms to either side, and a large kitchen and small bedroom behind. Upstairs there are three bedrooms. The interior features, including woodwork and plaster, are almost entirely original. The house was built sometime in the first quarter of the 18th century.

The house was declared a National Historic Landmark and listed on the National Register of Historic Places in 1971. In 1994 The Governor Samuel Huntington Trust was formed by local citizens to preserve the property. Since 1998 the trust has worked to restore and rehabilitate the property, and has sponsored archaeological work to understand its use. The trust operates it as a historic house museum, open for tours from May through October on the first and third Saturday of the month.

== Significance ==
Samuel Huntington was born in this house in 1731, when the area was still part of Windham. He was self-educated in the law, and was admitted to the bar in 1758. Prior to the American Revolution, Huntington practiced law and served in a variety of legal positions in the Connecticut Colony, including King's attorney, judge, and justice of the peace. He sat in the Connecticut State Legislature from 1775 to 1784, and also sat in the Continental Congress during those same years, serving as the body's president between 1779 and 1781. As a member of the Congress in 1776 he signed the United States Declaration of Independence. He was Governor of Connecticut from 1786 to 1796, the year of his death.

== See also ==
- List of the oldest buildings in Connecticut
- List of National Historic Landmarks in Connecticut
- National Register of Historic Places listings in Windham County, Connecticut
