= Henry Doremus House =

- U.S. National Register of Historic Places
- New Jersey Register of Historic Places
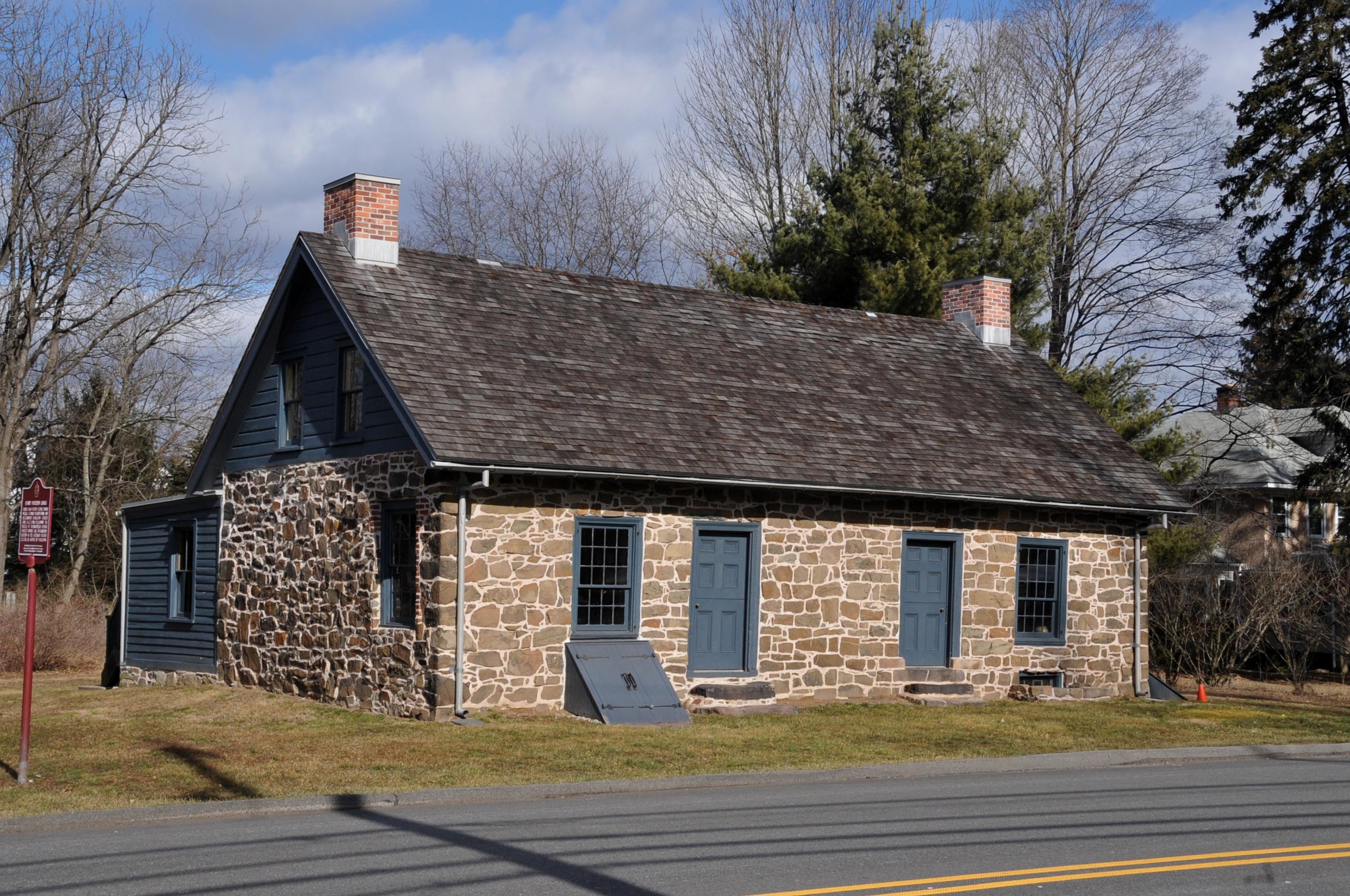

- Location within Morris County, New Jersey Location within New Jersey Location within the United States
- Location: 490 Main Road; Towaco, New Jersey
- Coordinates: 40°55′6″N 74°21′15″W
- Area: 12.4 acres (5.0 ha)
- Built: c. 1760
- Architectural style: Colonial, Dutch Colonial
- MPS: Dutch Stone Houses in Montville MPS
- NRHP reference No.: 72000805
- NJRHP No.: 2155

Significant dates
- Added to NRHP: October 31, 1972
- Designated NJRHP: November 25, 1991

The Henry Doremus House, also known as the Captain Thomas Doremus House, is a historic stone house located at 490 Main Road (U.S. Route 202) in the Towaco section of the township of Montville, New Jersey. The oldest section was built around 1760. It was added to the National Register of Historic Places on October 31, 1972, as the Doremus House for its significance in architecture. It was listed as the Henry Doremus House as part of the Dutch Stone Houses in Montville, New Jersey Multiple Property Submission (MPS) on January 17, 1992.

== History and description ==
The one and one-half story stone house was built c. 1760 by Henry Doremus, who later sold it to his brother Thomas Doremus. June 25–27, 1780, during the American Revolutionary War, the house was used as headquarters for General George Washington after the Battle of Springfield. August 26–28, 1781, the First Brigade of the French Army, the Expédition Particulière, under command of the French general Comte de Rochambeau, marched past this house, along the route to Yorktown, Virginia.

== See also ==
- National Register of Historic Places listings in Morris County, New Jersey
- List of Washington's Headquarters during the Revolutionary War
- List of historic sites preserved along Rochambeau's route
- List of the oldest buildings in New Jersey
