= Fourth Camp of Rochambeau's Army =

- U.S. National Register of Historic Places
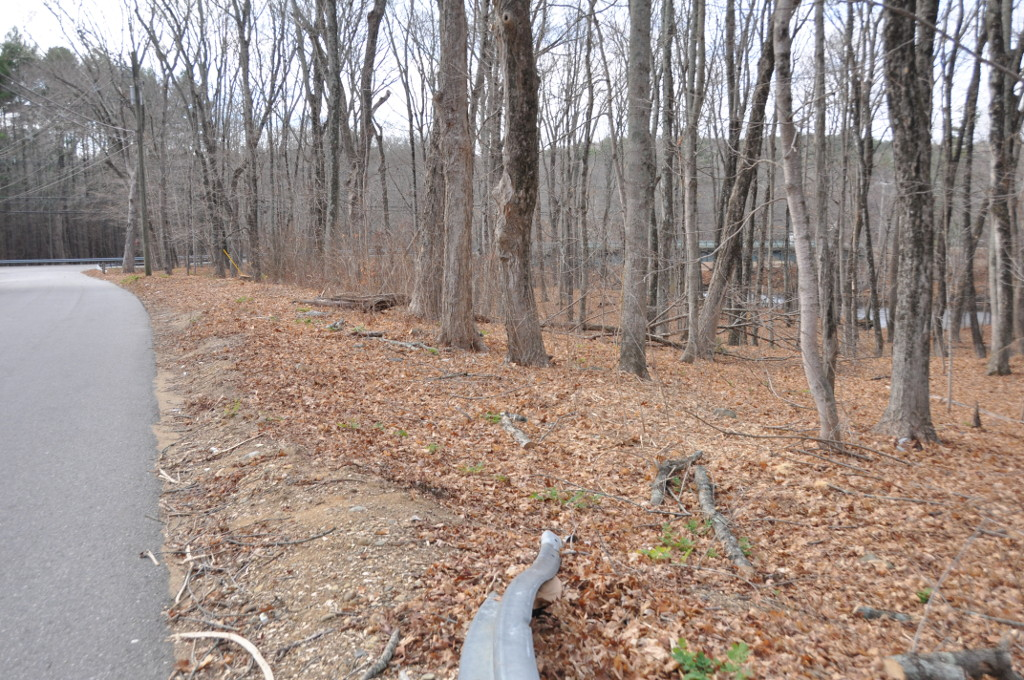

- Location within Connecticut Location within the United States
- Location: Plains Road near Lovers Lane, Windham, Connecticut
- Coordinates: 41°42′0″N 72°10′52″W
- Area: 16 acres (6.5 ha)
- Built: 1781
- MPS: Rochambeau's Army in Connecticut, 1780-1782 MPS
- NRHP reference No.: 02001680
- Added to NRHP: January 8, 2003

The Fourth Camp of Rochambeau's Army is a historic military camp site near Plains Road and Lovers Lane on the banks of the Shetucket River in Windham, Connecticut. It was here that the French Army encamped in the summer of 1781 under the command of Rochambeau on their march from Providence, Rhode Island to rendezvous with the Continental Army under General George Washington. Four divisions passed through, each one day apart. One of Rochambeau's aides described Windham at the time as "a charming market town, where, incidentally, there were many pretty women at whose homes we passed the afternoon very agreeably." Of the camp site, he wrote, "A mile away is a beautiful river (the Shetucket) with a fine wooden bridge. We camped on its banks very comfortably, though hardly militarily."

The camp site was listed on the National Register of Historic Places in 2003. The next campsite to the west is also NRHP-listed as Fifth Camp of Rochambeau's Infantry. On the army's return trip in 1782, its 47th camp site (also NRHP-listed) was at a different location in Windham. The site is one of multiple properties whose possible listing on the National Register was covered in a 2001 study.

== See also ==
- Washington–Rochambeau Revolutionary Route
- List of historic sites preserved along Rochambeau's route
- National Register of Historic Places listings in Windham County, Connecticut
