= Scotland, Connecticut =

- Town
- Town of Scotland
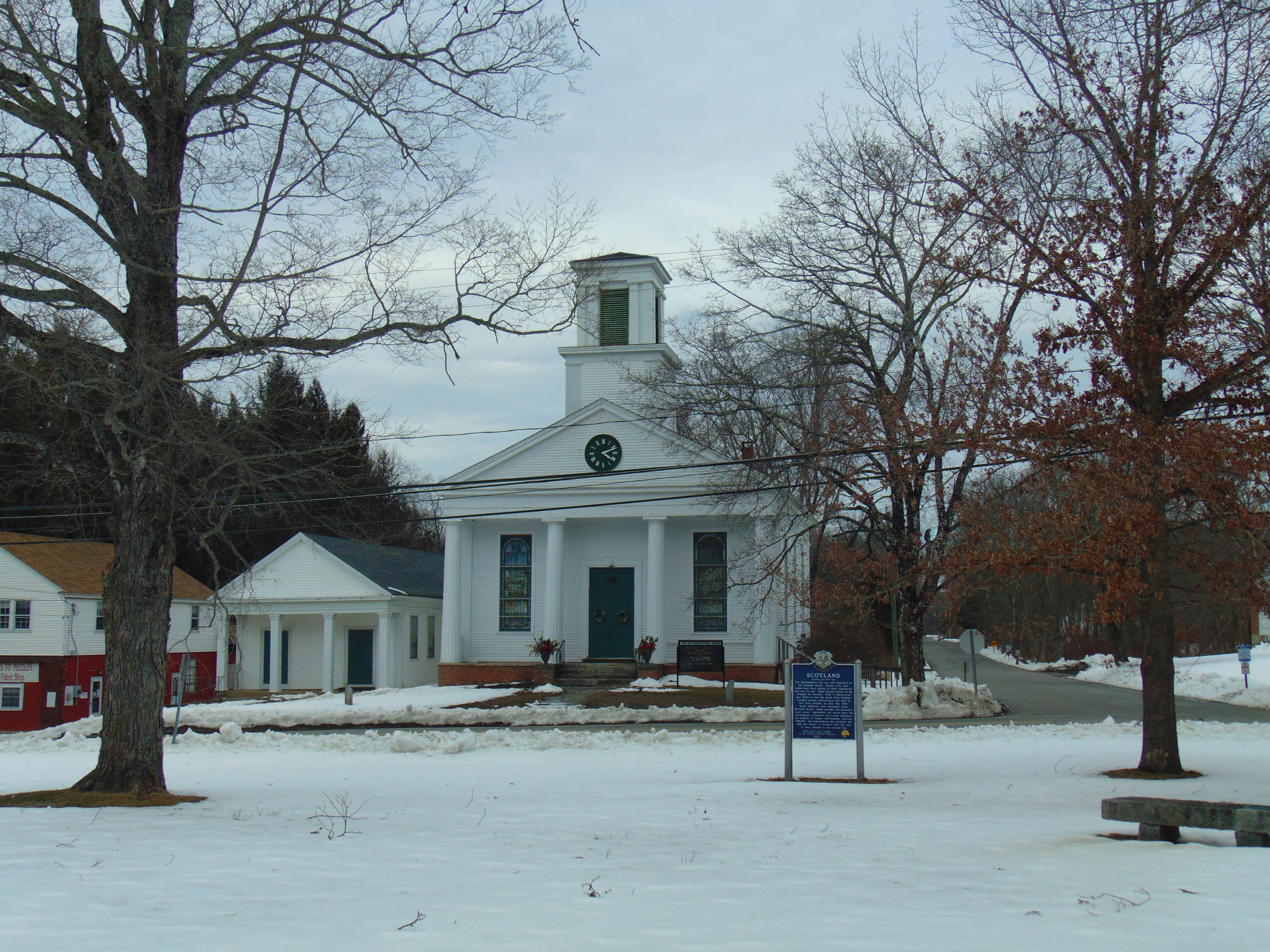
- The center of Scotland

- Seal

- Coordinates: 41°42′01″N 72°04′59″W
- Country: United States
- U.S. state: Connecticut
- County: Windham
- Region: Northeastern CT
- Incorporated: 1857

Government
  - Type: Selectman-town meeting
  - First selectman: Dana Barrow (R)
  - Selectman: Michael Gurnack (R)
  - Selectman: M. Barton Laws (D)

Area
  - Total: 18.7 sq mi (48.4 km^{2})
  - Land: 18.6 sq mi (48.2 km^{2})
  - Water: 0.039 sq mi (0.1 km^{2})
- Elevation: 272 ft (83 m)

Population (2020)
  - Total: 1,576
  - Density: 84.7/sq mi (32.7/km^{2})
- Time zone: UTC-5 (Eastern)
  - Summer (DST): UTC-4 (Eastern)
- ZIP code: 06264
- Area codes: 860/959
- FIPS code: 09-67400
- GNIS feature ID: 0213501
- Website: www.scotlandct.org

Scotland is a town in Windham County, Connecticut, United States. The town is part of the Northeastern Connecticut Planning Region. As of the 2020 census, the town population was 1,576. Scotland is a predominantly rural town, with agriculture being the principal industry. Scotland is the least populous town in Windham County.

== Geography ==
According to the U.S. Census Bureau, the town has a total area of 18.7 square miles (48.3 km^{2}), of which 18.6 square miles (48.2 km^{2}) is land and 0.1 square mile (0.1 km^{2}) (0.27%) is water.

== History ==
In 1700, Isaac Magoon purchased 1,950 acres (7.9 km^{2}) of land from then Windham and thus began Scotland's History. He named the town Scotland as a way of commemorating his ancestral home. Scotland was incorporated in May 1857.

== Government ==
The town still maintains the town meeting as its form of government with a board of selectmen. The town also has eight boards & commissions, including Inlands & Wetlands, Planning & Zoning and Board of Education.

=== Education ===
Scotland Elementary School, located on Brook Road, serves grades Pre-K–6 for the town, which is part of Regional School District 11.

== Attractions ==
Scotland is home to the D'Elia Antique Tool Museum, a museum established in 2005 in the Scotland Public Library building. It holds more than 1,200 antique woodworking planes dating to the mid-18th century.

The Samuel Huntington Birthplace, birthplace of Samuel Huntington, a Founding Father, is on Huntington Road (CT Route 14).

== Transportation ==
CT Route 14 passes east–west through the town. Route 97 goes north–south through the town. The Providence and Worcester Railroad runs through the southwestern part of the town, but doesn't stop.

== On the National Register of Historic Places ==
- March Route of Rochambeau's Army: Palmer Road: Palmer Road, from intersection with Miller Road to east of junction with Pudding Hill Road (added July 6, 2003)
- Samuel Huntington Birthplace: Route 14, 2 miles (3.2 km) west of Route 97 (added December 11, 1971)
- Edward Waldo House: Waldo Road, intersects with Route 97 (added 1978)

== Demographics ==
Historical population
Census	Pop.	Note	%±
1860	720		—
1870	643		−10.7%
1880	590		−8.2%
1890	506		−14.2%
1900	471		−6.9%
1910	476		1.1%
1920	391		−17.9%
1930	402		2.8%
1940	478		18.9%
1950	513		7.3%
1960	684		33.3%
1970	1,022		49.4%
1980	1,072		4.9%
1990	1,215		13.3%
2000	1,556		28.1%
2010	1,726		10.9%
2020	1,576		−8.7%
U.S. Decennial Census

At the 2020 census there were 1,576 people, 553 households, and 425 families living in the town. The population density was 83.6 inhabitants per square mile (32.3/km^{2}). There were 577 housing units at an average density of 31.0 per square mile (12.0/km^{2}). The racial makeup of the town was 97.69% White, 0.45% African American, 0.06% Native American, 0.51% Asian, 0.19% Pacific Islander, 0.51% from other races, and 0.58% from two or more races. Hispanic or Latino of any race were 2.31%.

Of the 553 households 37.4% had children under the age of 18 living with them, 67.5% were married couples living together, 6.9% had a female householder with no husband present, and 23.0% were non-families. 15.7% of households were one person and 4.9% were one person aged 65 or older. The average household size was 2.81 and the average family size was 3.16.

The age distribution was 28.2% under the age of 18, 5.9% from 18 to 24, 31.7% from 25 to 44, 25.3% from 45 to 64, and 8.9% 65 or older. The median age was 37 years. For every 100 females, there were 100.8 males. For every 100 females age 18 and over, there were 98.0 males.

The median household income was $56,848 and the median family income was $60,147. Males had a median income of $40,871 versus $29,830 for females. The per capita income for the town was $22,573. About 4.0% of families and 4.7% of the population were below the poverty line, including 4.7% of those under age 18 and 10.9% of those age 65 or over.

== Notable person ==
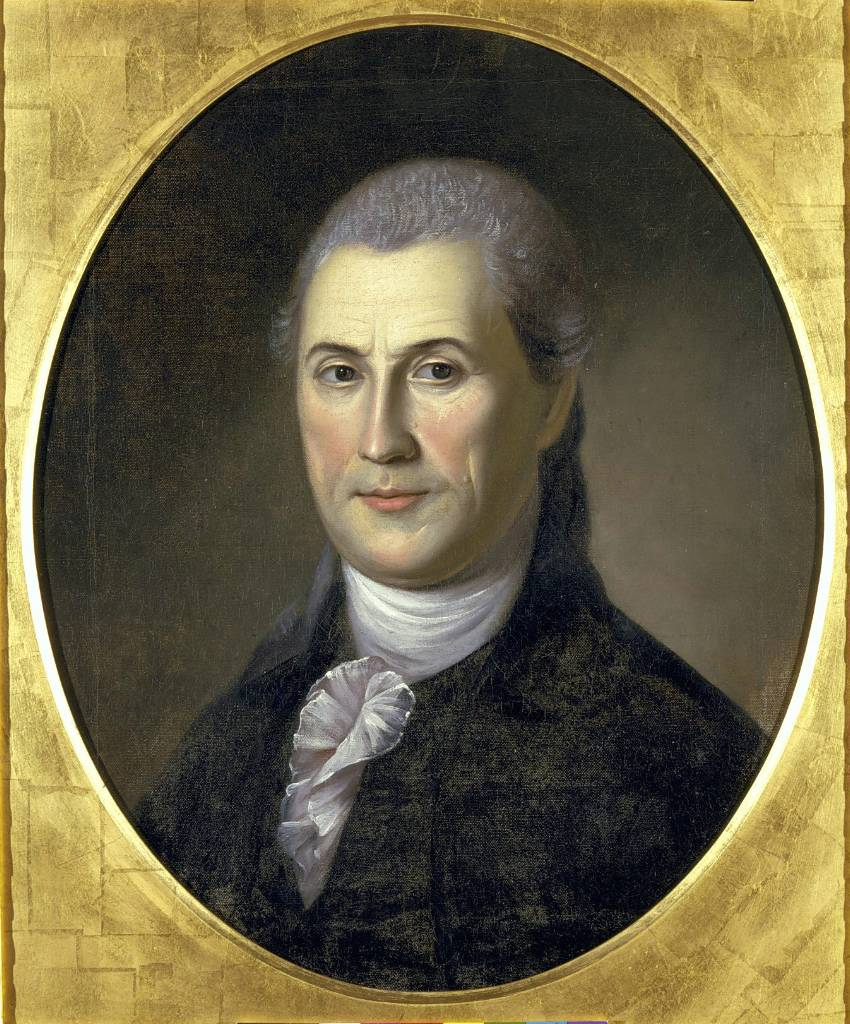
Samuel Huntington depicted in a 1783 portrait by Charles Willson Peale

- Samuel Huntington (1731–1796) a leading American Patriot during the American Revolution and a Founding Father and delegate to the Second Continental Congress in Philadelphia, where he signed the Declaration of Independence
