= Washington–Rochambeau Revolutionary Route =

National Historic Trail of the United States

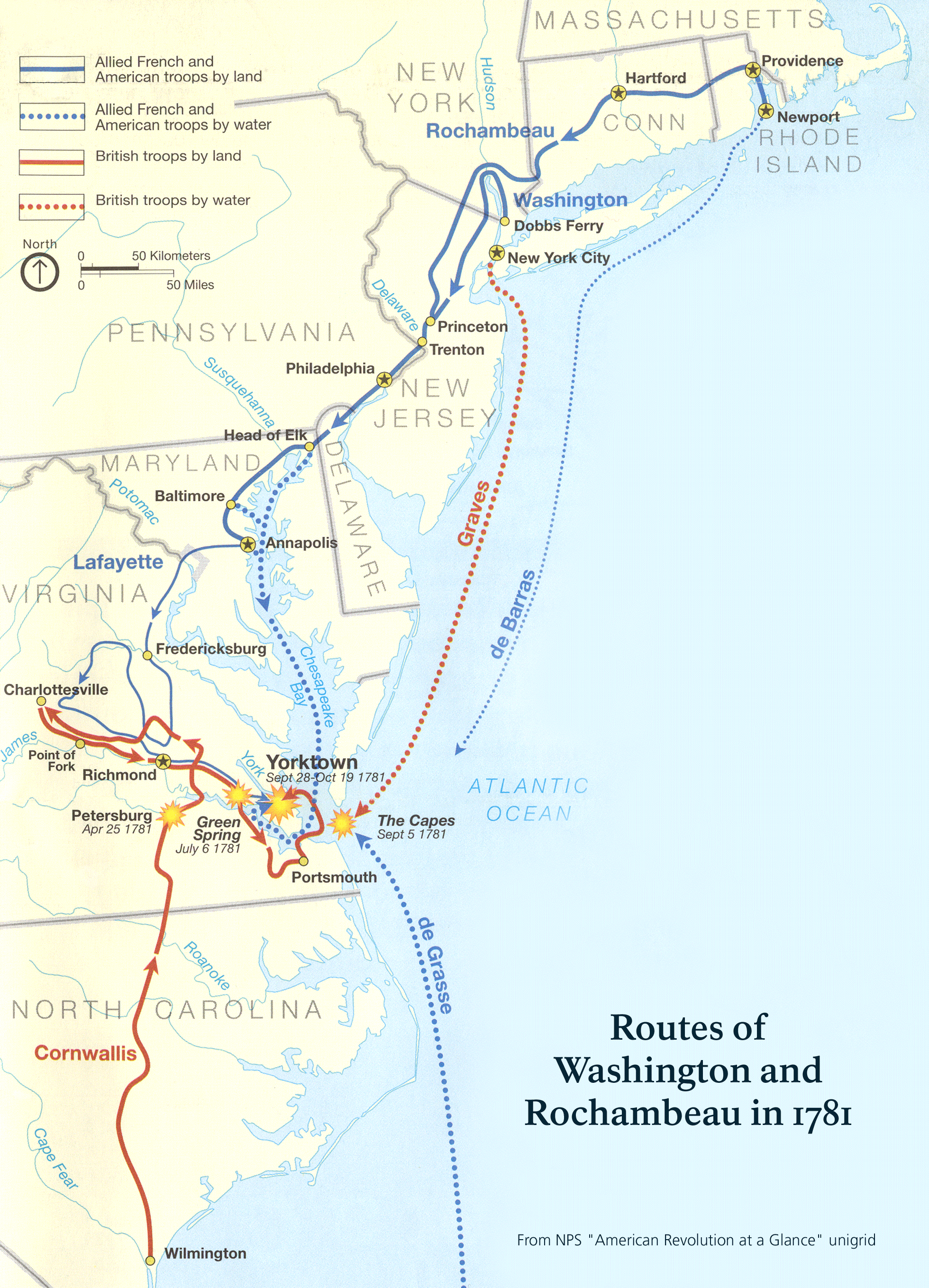
NPS map of the W3R Route

The Washington–Rochambeau Revolutionary Route is a 680-mile (1,090 km) series of roads used in 1781 by the Continental Army under the command of George Washington and the Expédition Particulière under the command of Jean-Baptiste de Rochambeau during their 14-week march from Newport, Rhode Island, to Yorktown, Virginia.

French forces left Rhode Island in June 1781 and joined Washington's force on the Hudson River the following month. The combined American and French armies headed south in August, marching through New Jersey, Pennsylvania, Delaware, and Maryland, a route that allowed them to evade British troops. They reached Williamsburg, Virginia, in late September, several weeks after the French royal fleet had won the Battle of the Chesapeake, preventing the British from reinforcing or evacuating General Charles Cornwallis's army. On September 22, they combined with troops commanded by the Marquis de Lafayette. A three-week siege of Yorktown led to Cornwallis's surrender on October 19, 1781. The route is a designated National Historic Trail with interpretive literature, signs, and exhibits that describe the key role of French diplomatic, military, and economic aid to the United States during the American Revolutionary War.

== Background ==
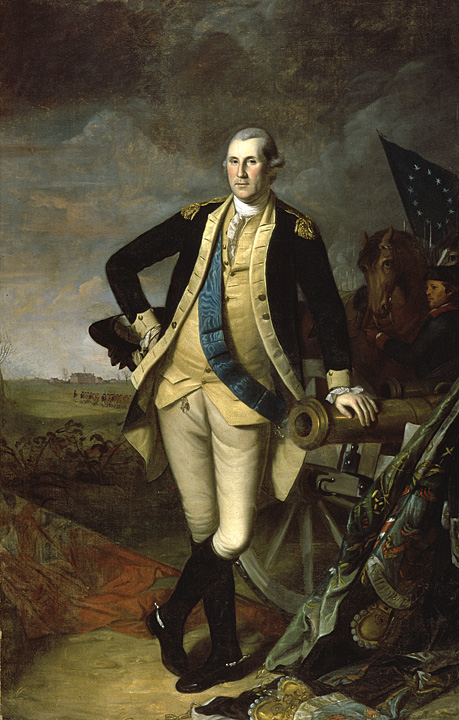
Washington at Princeton by Charles Willson Peale (1779)

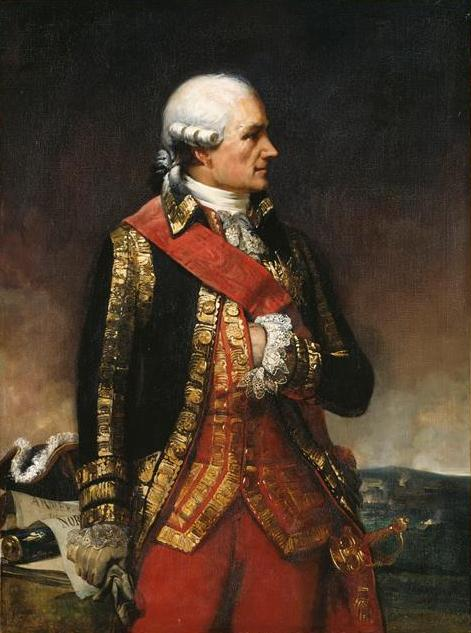
Jean-Baptiste Donatien de Vimeur, comte de Rochambeau

In 1780, French King Louis XVI dispatched Rochambeau, 450 officers, and 5,300 men to help Washington and the American forces. They arrived in Narragansett Bay off Newport, Rhode Island, on July 10, 1780.

In June 1781, Rochambeau prepared to march from Rhode Island to join the Continental Army under George Washington on the Hudson River at Dobbs Ferry, New York. Rochambeau divided his force into four regiments: "Royal DeuxPonts" under the Baron de Vioménil; "Soissonnais" under the Baron's brother Count de Vioménil; "Saintonge" under the Marquis de Custine; and a fourth regiment. This final unit remained in Providence where it guarded the baggage and munitions stored in the Old Market House and supported the surgeons and attendants at the hospital in University Hall. The advance party was led by Armand Louis de Gontaut or Duc de Lauzun. His Lauzun's Legion would march ahead of the main army and stay 10 to 15 miles (16 to 24 km) to the south, protecting the exposed flank from the British.

== Rhode Island to New York ==
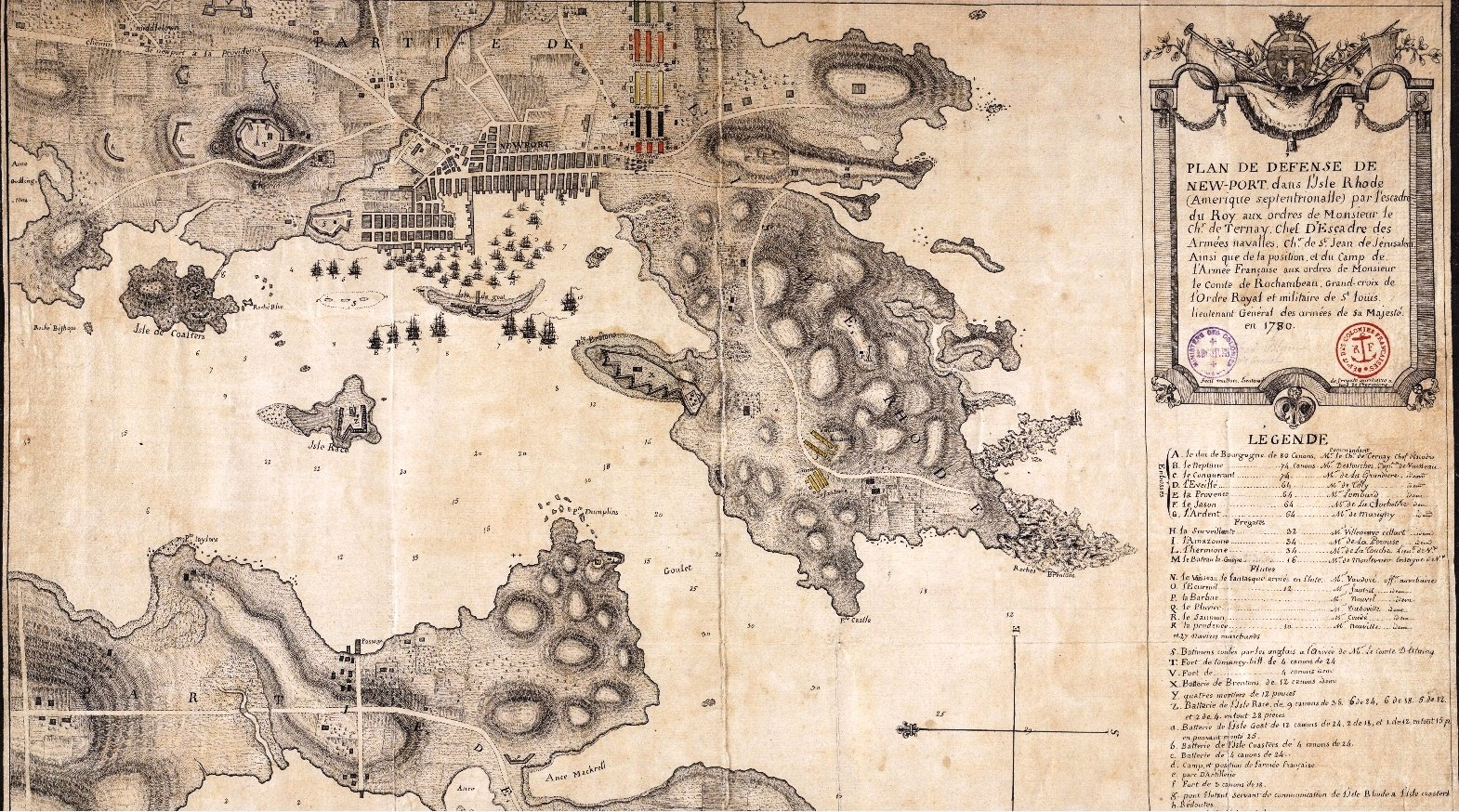
Map of Newport with the camp of Rochambeau's troops and the position of Knight Ternay's squadron in 1780

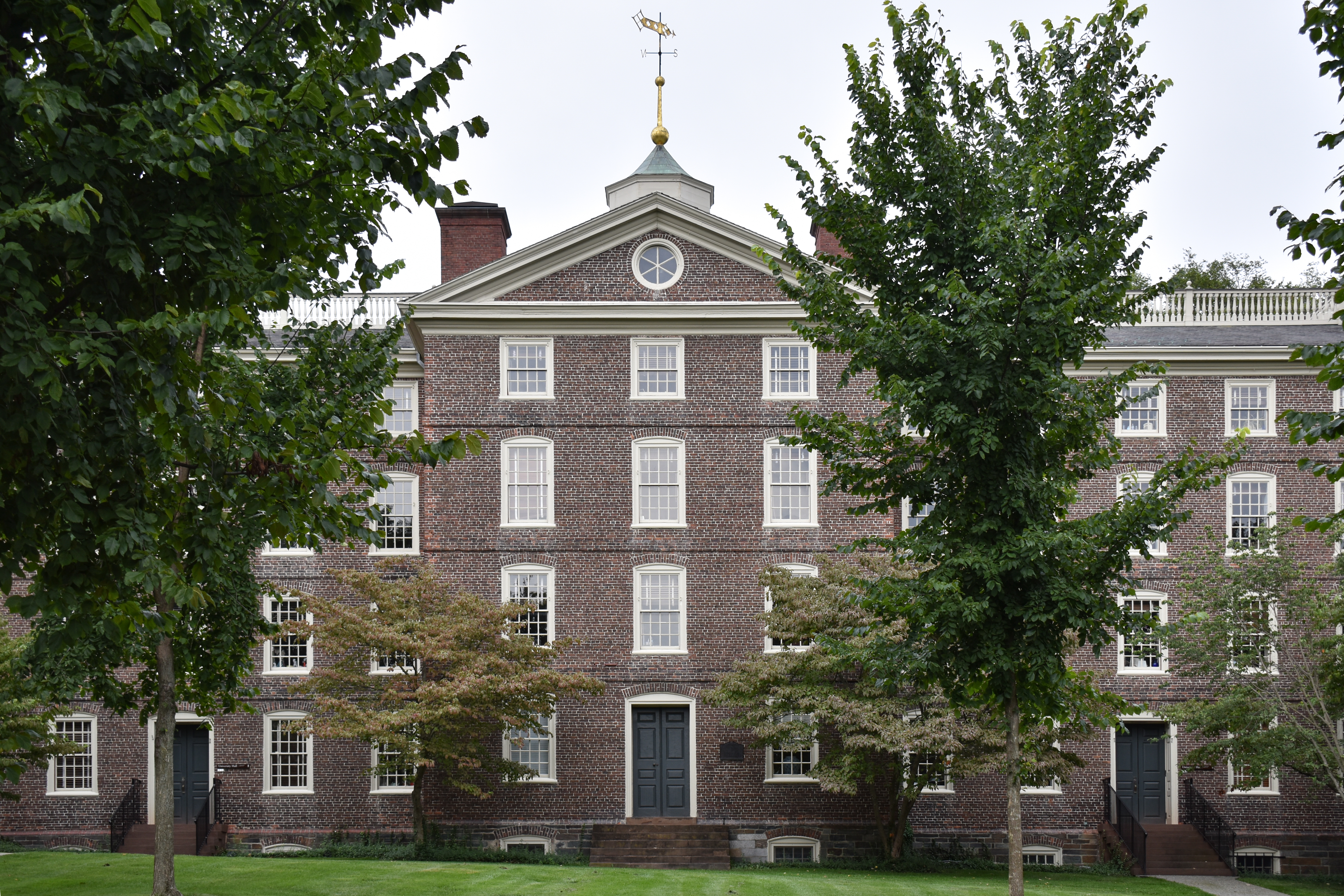
Brown University's University Hall was used as a hospital for injured troops.

=== Providence to Coventry ===
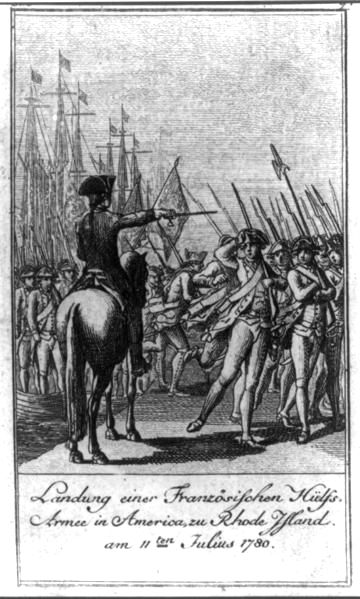
Landing of a French auxiliary army in Newport, Rhode Island, on July 11, 1780, under the command of the Comte de Rochambeau

Rochambeau and his general staff left Newport on June 10, 1781, arriving at Providence the following day. The remainder of his force at Newport was transferred by boat and camped in Providence. The French Army performed a grand review in Providence on June 16, then set out for Coventry in four divisions. One division departed each day from June 18 to 21.

Each division had roughly the same amount of artillery and supplies, as well as a field hospital. Rochambeau left with the first division (the Bourbonnais Regiment) and arrived at Waterman Tavern in the evening of June 18. The remainder of the army started leaving camp between Broad and Plain Streets on June 19. The route generally followed the alignment of Broad Street to Olneyville. They passed through Stewart Street to High Street, and west along this to the "junction" (Hoyle Tavern), where they took Cranston Street (then called the Monkey Town road) that went to Knightsville (then Monkeytown), then took Route 14 to the eastern side of the Scituate Reservoir. The original road is submerged in the reservoir but picks up again as Old Plainfield Pike in Scituate. The march route resumes west of Route 102 in Foster, following Route 14 into Coventry.

The march continued the next day through Sterling, Connecticut, via Route 14A (Plainfield Pike) to Plainfield opposite Plainfield Cemetery. A 3.6-mile portion of the march route is listed on the National Register of Historic Places (NRHP). Its 2002 NRHP nomination document records "the road retains its narrow, hilly, winding character, and for most of its length, the characteristic borders of stone walls remain in place." The French found this particular segment to be difficult for marching, resulting in the late arrival of some artillery and supply wagons at the Plainfield camp.

=== Windham ===
On June 20, they continued along Route 14A to Canterbury then along Route 14 to Scotland. They arrived in the evening of June 20 in Windham by the Shetucket River, just west of Windham Center.

Most of Routes 14A and 14 have lost their 18th-century visual character, but several short road segments remain preserved. Some of these road segments have been listed on the NRHP. One such segment is Old Canterbury Road in western Plainfield which was bypassed by state highway construction in the 1930s; it preserves some of the features of the original roadway, including the low stone walls lining the road. The designated portion of the route also includes a 1,200-foot section of modern Route 14A east of the eastern end of Old Canterbury Road that maintains visual continuity of Old Canterbury Road.

Manship Road and a portion of Barstow Road (between Manship Road and Route 14) in Canterbury were also bypassed during highway construction, located midway between Canterbury Center and the village of Westminster. A segment of Route 14 east of Scotland Center has also been recognized as a preserved section of the march route. The designated segment runs from Miller Road to the top of a hill, about 800 feet east of Route 97, known locally as Palmer Road. The low stone walls remain in place on both sides of this road segment, described by the French as "a narrow, steep, and stony road".

Scotland Road in Windham also remains between the third and fourth encampments, from Back Road to a point about 300 feet east of Ballahamack Road. This portion is also listed on the NRHP, and it was one of the less difficult roads, according to the French. The road is now mostly modern in appearance, but the expansive views of the surrounding landscape contribute to the visual historical significance of the site, in addition to the preserved stone walls.

=== Bolton ===
The army continued its march through Connecticut on June 21, past Willimantic, roughly following modern Route 14 and Route 66. They proceeded through Columbia and Andover towards the fifth camp site in Bolton. In Andover, the original march route used what is now Hutchinson Road and Bailey Road. A segment of Hutchinson Road between Route 6 and Henderson Road retains the stone walls and mature trees along the side of the road, as well as the expansive views of open fields towards the Hop River. This road segment is listed on the NRHP. The Daniel White Tavern was built in 1773 and used by French officers, and it still stands along this road segment. North of Henderson Road, Hutchinson Road has modern development and no longer has the visual continuity of the southern part of the road.

The march route proceeded along Route 66 then Route 6 until roughly the northwest corner of Andover. The camp was located in Bolton Center, but the original road leading there has been unused since the late 19th century and has been overgrown by forest. A remnant of Bailey Road in Bolton (also on the NRHP) exists as an unpaved footpath and still retains the characteristic stone walls, as well as two original stone culverts.

=== East Hartford ===
The march continued on June 22 along Bolton Center Road (partly Route 85), continuing along Middle Turnpike East in Manchester until Route 6. From there, they followed Route 6 through Manchester Center to Silver Lane in East Hartford. The four divisions had been traveling a day apart. They rested for three nights in East Hartford, necessitating additional camp sites. Route 6 is a state highway trunk line route, and the surrounding area is heavily urbanized and has lost most of its historic character. However, two sections of the road have been bypassed in Andover and Bolton and remain relatively preserved in their 18th-century appearance.

=== Hartford to Ridgebury ===
The first division crossed the Connecticut River by ferry on June 25 into Hartford, with the other divisions following in one-day intervals as before. From there, they traveled along Farmington Avenue through West Hartford until Farmington, the site of the seventh camp. The camp site was located toward the south end of the town center village. Rochambeau and his officers are said to have stayed at the Elm Tree Inn. The army followed Route 10 on June 26 through the town center of Southington until the Milldale section of town, then headed west along Route 322 until they reached the eighth camp site in the Marion section of Southington. Rochambeau and his officers stayed at the Asa Barnes Tavern.

The following day, they continued westward along Route 322, then Meriden Road into Waterbury. In Waterbury, the route followed East Main Street and West Main Street, crossing the Naugatuck River along the way. The road west of Waterbury was difficult and characterized by the French as being "détestables" for being very stony and mountainous. The route continued into Middlebury, specifically the area around Breakneck Hill. The march route followed Park Road to Watertown Road, then turned south on Watertown Road until Breakneck Hill Road. The ninth camp was located at the foot of Breakneck Hill, where the first division stayed the night of June 27. Rochambeau and his officers were entertained at the Israel Bronson Tavern.

On June 28, the first division resumed its march heading south on Artillery Road and Middlebury Road (Route 64) through the town center of Middlebury, continuing along Route 188 and Waterbury Road into the center of Southbury. The army continued west along Main Street South and River Road through Southbury, crossing the Housatonic River into Newtown using a bridge built by the Colonial troops in 1778 at Glen Road. They continued along Church Hill Road through the center of Newtown, where they set up their tenth camp west of the town center. The officers stayed in Caleb Baldwin's Tavern.

Rochambeau reorganized his troops into two brigades in Newtown. The first division resumed its march on June 30, heading west on West Street and Castle Hill Road, then turning north along Reservoir Road and west again on Route 6. The Reservoir Road portion is well preserved and is listed on the NRHP. The army marched along Route 6 and Newtown Road into Danbury. In Danbury, they used West Wooster Street, Park Avenue, and Backus Avenue to reach the Ridgebury section of the town of Ridgefield. The eleventh camp was set up on July 1 in Ridgebury near the Congregational Church.

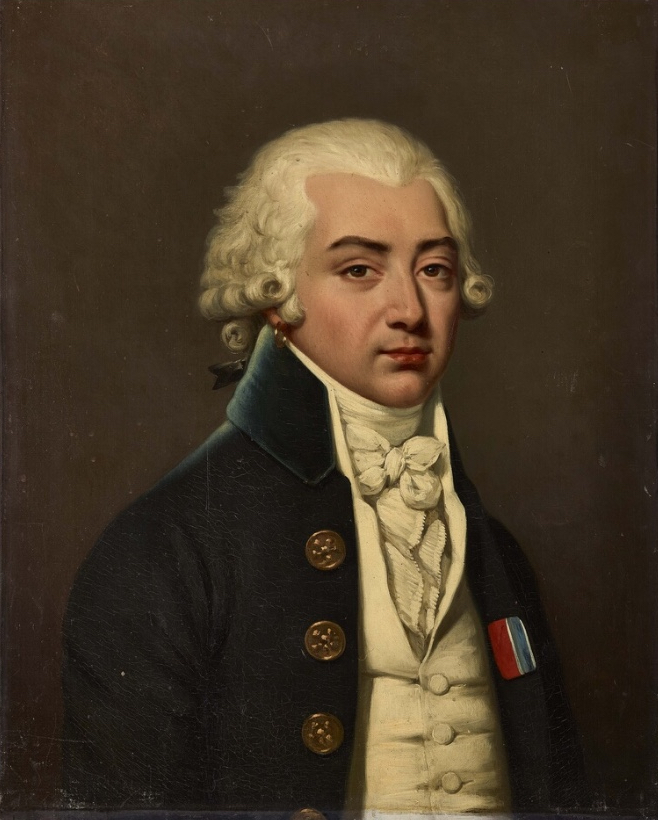
Armand Louis de Gontaut

=== Crossing into New York ===
The march was resumed the morning of July 2, heading south on Ridgebury Road, then turning west on Mopus Bridge Road. After crossing the New York state line, they continued southwest and south following Route 121 past the hamlets of North Salem and Cross River to the hamlet of Bedford Village. The first brigade set up camp in Bedford Village (12th camp) and resumed the following day, while the second brigade skipped the Bedford camp. The march continued west along Route 172 to the village of Mount Kisco, about five miles west of the Bedford camp. The French stayed in Mount Kisco until the morning of July 6. They marched west and south for 16 miles along Route 133 and Route 100 to the present-day Hartsdale area of Greenburgh. They camped in the Greenburgh area (14th camp) for the next six weeks. This location became known as Philipsburg Encampment as the land belonged to the massive colonial landholding, Philipsburg Manor. It was here that the French forces under Rochambeau and the American forces under Washington united for the first time.

== New Jersey ==
Rochambeau's force left Philipsburg Camp in late August, crossing the Hudson River at King's Ferry and headed south into New Jersey following several paths southward. Washington's route starts at the New York border in Mahwah and winds through Bergen, Passiac, Essex, Union, Middlesex and Mercer counties. Rochambeau's route is similar but goes further west, passing through Morris and Somerset counties before ending up, like Washington's, in Trenton for the crossing of the Delaware River into Pennsylvania.

In Union County the trail along which the American troops marched runs along numerous county roads, including: Raritan Road (CR509) and Lamberts Mill Road (CR606) in Scotch Plains, West Broad Street in Westfield (CR509), Mountain Avenue in Westfield, Mountainside and Springfield (CR613), Morris Avenue in Springfield (SR 82), and Morris Turnpike in Summit (SR 24). The forces camped at Morven August 29-31. A monument at Trinity Church, Princeton, commemorates the occasion. The troops crossed the Millstone River twice, at Griggstown Causeway and at Route 518 near Rocky Hill. They left Princeton on August 31 and headed south on the King's Highway towards Trenton. They camped at the William Trent House in Trenton on September 2, also known as Bloomsbury and owned by an assistant quartermaster general of the Continental Army.

== Pennsylvania to Virginia ==
After crossing the Delaware, they roughly followed U.S. Route 13 south, crossing the Pennypack Creek Bridge along the way. In Philadelphia they camped on the east bank of the Schuylkill River, near the site of the Market Street Bridge and Philadelphia City Hall. By September 5, the French army marched through the city and was reviewed by the Congress of the Confederation. The Freeman's Journal reported "the appearance of these troops far exceeds any thing of the kind seen on this continent, and presages the happiest success to the cause of America."

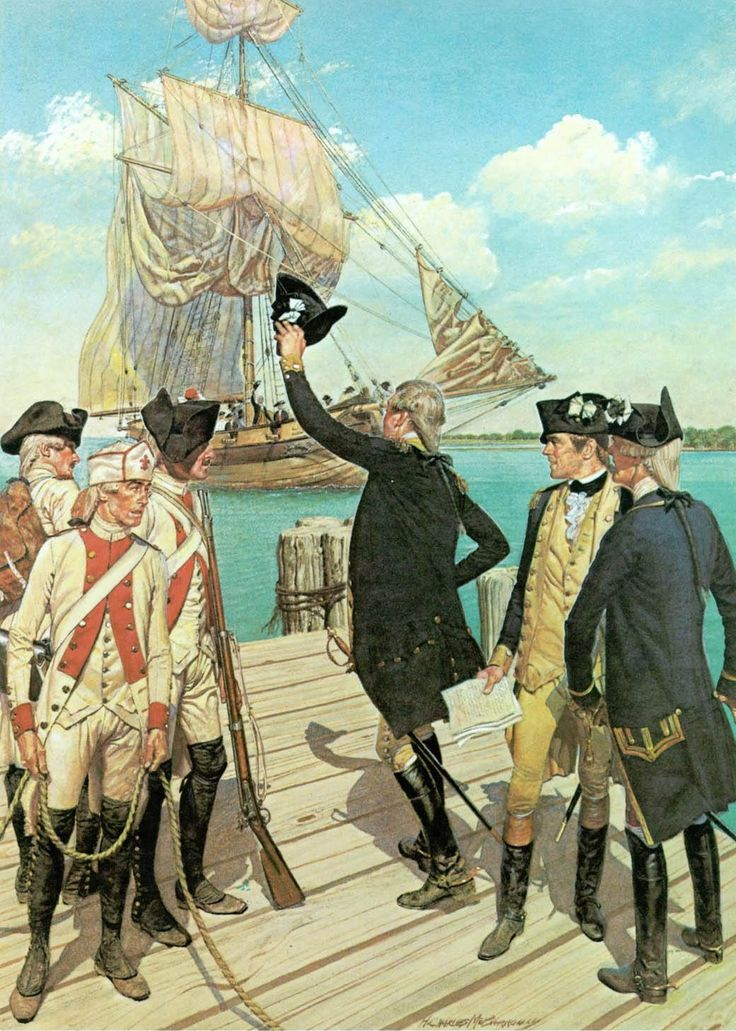
George Washington waves to Rochambeau arriving at Chester by the Delaware River.

Washington and Rochambeau left Philadelphia by September 5. Washington traveled overland, roughly continuing on modern U.S. Route 13, while Rochambeau embarked on the Delaware River. They met at Chester, Pennsylvania, where Washington shared the news of the French fleet's arrival in the Chesapeake Bay. Washington pressed ahead to Head of Elk, the beginning of navigable Chesapeake waters, to procure transport. About 1,000 American and French troops embarked for Jamestown, Virginia, while the remainder continued their march through Baltimore and Annapolis, Maryland. In Baltimore, one French regiment was encamped at Camden Station at the modern intersection of South Howard and West Camden Streets. Across the harbor to the east, a German regiment under French leadership camped along Harford Run (Central Avenue) in Jonestown. Others were situated along the Jones Falls on modern North Charles Street. The French cavalry, artillery, and baggage train camped just to the north of Market (now Baltimore Street) between Paca and Howard Streets. A brigade of American troops rested at Fells Point. The allied forces left Baltimore on September 15.

Washington and a small group of aides rode ahead and reached his estate at Mount Vernon on September 9, after a six-year absence; Rochambeau and his staff arrived the following day. On September 12, the two commanders continued their journey and arrived in Williamsburg, Virginia, on September 14, gathering the troops and supplies to begin the siege at Yorktown. The allied supply wagon train arrived in Alexandria, Virginia, after a two-day march from Georgetown in late September, including crossing the Potomac River. It occupied a length of about half a mile, north of Oronoco Street and bisected by Washington Street (subsequently the Robert E. Lee Boyhood Home). The wagon train left Alexandria on September 26, heading west, then south.

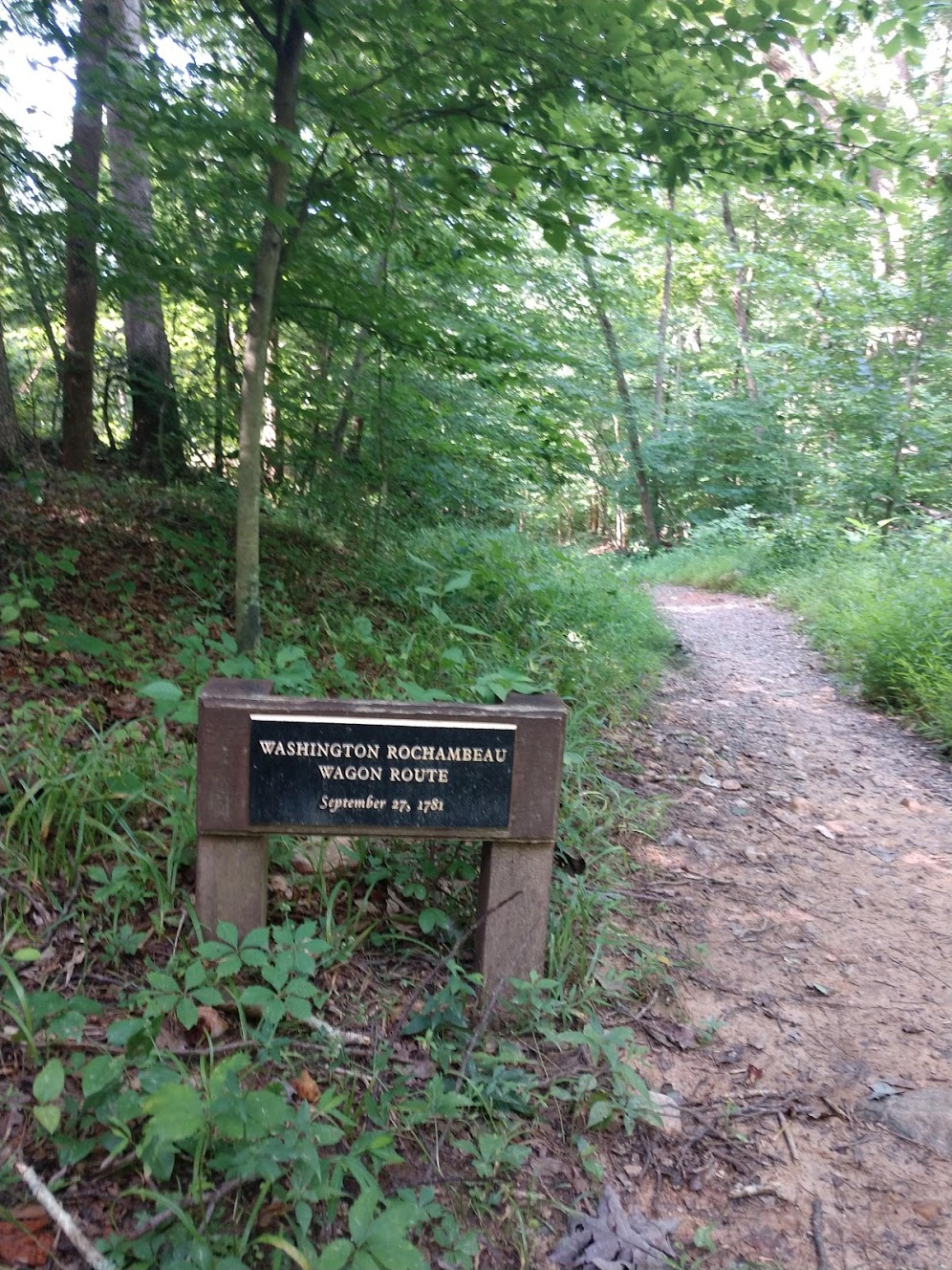
Washington Rochambeau Wagon Road trail above Wolf Run Shoals near Clifton, Virginia, 2019

Washington ordered construction of a wagon road to Wolf Run Shoals on the Occoquan River near Woodbridge, Virginia. The combined American-French force followed this road and crossed the Occoquan to the south on September 27. The wagon train followed modern Route 234 to Dumfries, then followed the King's Highway south near Triangle. By the end of September, the wagon train was at Trebell's Landing on the James River and was then conveyed overland about six miles (now Route 238) to the siege lines at Yorktown. The accompanying troops disembarked at landings near Williamsburg.

== See also ==
- List of George Washington articles
- List of historic sites preserved along Rochambeau's route
- Neutral Ground of Westchester County in the Revolutionary War
- Colonial American military history
- Colonial history of the United States
- James Manning – president of Brown University during Rochambeau's year-long stay there.
- Joseph Webb House – Location of the five-day military conference between Washington and Rochambeau during the march
- King's Highway (Charleston to Boston)
