= National Register of Historic Places listings in Tolland County, Connecticut =

Location of Tolland County in Connecticut

This is a list of the National Register of Historic Places listings in Tolland County, Connecticut.

This is intended to be a complete list of the properties and districts on the National Register of Historic Places in Tolland County, Connecticut, United States. The locations of National Register properties and districts for which the latitude and longitude coordinates are included below, may be seen in an online map.

There are 52 properties and districts listed on the National Register in the county.

Contents: Counties and municipalities in Connecticut

Fairfield (city of Bridgeport | town of Greenwich | city of Stamford) | Hartford (city of Hartford | town of Southington | town of West Hartford | town of Windsor) | Litchfield | Middlesex (city of Middletown) | New Haven (city of New Haven) | New London | Tolland | Windham

This National Park Service list is complete through NPS recent listings posted September 11, 2026.

== Current listings ==
	Name on the Register	Image	Date listed	Location	City or town	Description
1	Andover Center Historic District	Andover Center Historic District	April 18, 2003 (#03000236)	Roughly along Hebron Road, Boston Hill Road, and US 6; 41°44′03″N 72°22′30″W	Andover	
2	Bolton Green Historic District	Bolton Green Historic District	April 12, 2001 (#01000357)	Roughly the Green, 219, 220, 222, 228, 233, 266 Bolton Center Road and 3 Hebron Road; 41°46′20″N 72°25′42″W	Bolton	
3	Brigham's Tavern	Brigham's Tavern	March 25, 1982 (#82004383)	12 Boston Turnpike; 41°47′58″N 72°18′53″W	Coventry	
4	John Cady House	John Cady House	April 12, 1982 (#82004390)	484 Mile Hill Road; 41°49′51″N 72°24′00″W	Tolland	
5	Capron-Phillips House	Capron-Phillips House	April 27, 1982 (#82004384)	1129 Main Street; 41°46′00″N 72°17′54″W	Coventry	
6	Captain Nathan Hale Monument	Captain Nathan Hale Monument	January 28, 2002 (#01001531)	120 Lake Street; 41°46′04″N 72°18′24″W	Coventry	
7	Columbia Green Historic District	Columbia Green Historic District	December 6, 1990 (#90001759)	Along CT 87 at its Junction with CT 66; 41°42′05″N 72°18′10″W	Columbia	
8	Jared Cone House	Jared Cone House	February 21, 1990 (#90000155)	25 Hebron Road; 41°45′58″N 72°26′02″W	Bolton	
9	Coventry Glass Factory Historic District	Coventry Glass Factory Historic District	August 27, 1987 (#87000806)	U.S. Route 44 and North River Road; 41°47′56″N 72°21′02″W	Coventry	
10	Eldredge Mills Archeological District	Eldredge Mills Archeological District	October 20, 2000 (#00000938)	Address Restricted	Willington	
11	Ellington Center Historic District	Ellington Center Historic District	November 15, 1990 (#90001754)	Roughly Maple Street from Berr Avenue to just West of the High School and Main Street from Jobs Hill Road to East Green; 41°54′15″N 72°28′17″W	Ellington	
12	Farwell Barn	Farwell Barn	January 26, 2001 (#00001649)	Horsebarn Hill Road; 41°49′08″N 72°14′57″W	Mansfield	Also known as the Jacobson Barn; on the UConn campus
13	Fifth Camp of Rochambeau's Infantry	Fifth Camp of Rochambeau's Infantry	April 30, 2001 (#01000446)	Bolton Heritage Farm; 41°46′14″N 72°25′36″W	Bolton	
14	Florence Mill	Florence Mill	July 18, 1978 (#78002858)	121 West Main Street; 41°51′52″N 72°27′15″W	Vernon	
15	Gurleyville Historic District	Gurleyville Historic District	December 30, 1975 (#75001933)	North of Mansfield Center off CT 195 at the Junction of Gurleyville and Chaffeeville Roads; 41°48′47″N 72°13′21″W	Mansfield	
16	Nathan Hale Homestead	Nathan Hale Homestead	October 22, 1970 (#70000698)	South Street; 41°45′50″N 72°20′47″W	Coventry	
17	Hebron Center Historic District	Hebron Center Historic District	July 30, 1993 (#93000649)	Church, Gilead, Main, Wall, and West Streets and Marjorie Circle; 41°39′26″N 72°22′08″W	Hebron	
18	Knesseth Israel Synagogue	Knesseth Israel Synagogue	July 21, 1995 (#95000862)	236 Pinney Street; 41°53′50″N 72°28′48″W	Ellington	
19	Loomis-Pomeroy House	Loomis-Pomeroy House	April 26, 1994 (#94000370)	1747 Boston Turnpike; 41°47′52″N 72°22′35″W	Coventry	
20	Mansfield Center Cemetery	Mansfield Center Cemetery	July 24, 1992 (#92000905)	Junction of Storrs and Cemetery Roads; 41°45′43″N 72°11′46″W	Mansfield	
21	Mansfield Center Historic District	Mansfield Center Historic District	February 23, 1972 (#72001337)	Storrs Road; 41°46′37″N 72°11′55″W	Mansfield	
22	Mansfield Hollow Dam	Mansfield Hollow Dam	April 12, 2009 (#03000194)	141 Mansfield Hollow Road; 41°45′20″N 72°10′54″W	Mansfield and Windham	Extends into Windham County
23	Mansfield Hollow Historic District	Mansfield Hollow Historic District	May 21, 1979 (#79002667)	86-127 Mansfield Hollow Road; 41°45′25″N 72°11′09″W	Mansfield	
24	Mansfield Training School and Hospital	Mansfield Training School and Hospital	December 22, 1987 (#87001513)	Junction of CT 32 and US 44; 41°48′22″N 72°18′16″W	Mansfield	
25	March Route of Rochambeau's Army: Bailey Road	March Route of Rochambeau's Army: Bailey Road	January 8, 2003 (#02001677)	Bailey Road; 41°45′44″N 72°24′49″W	Bolton	
26	March Route of Rochambeau's Army: Hutchinson Road	March Route of Rochambeau's Army: Hutchinson Road	May 6, 2002 (#02000425)	Hutchinson Road from its Junction with Hendee Road Southward to its end 41°45′26″N 72°23′59″W	Andover	
27	Minterburn Mill	Minterburn Mill	February 16, 1984 (#84001171)	215 East Main Street; 41°52′04″N 72°25′59″W	Vernon	
28	Old Rockville High School and East School	Old Rockville High School and East School	April 27, 1981 (#81000614)	School and Park Streets; 41°52′07″N 72°26′53″W	Vernon	Now the Board of Education building
29	Oliver White Tavern	Oliver White Tavern	May 6, 2002 (#02000422)	2 Brandy Street; 41°46′11″N 72°25′29″W	Bolton	
30	Parker-Hutchinson Farm	Parker-Hutchinson Farm	April 29, 1982 (#82004386)	Parker Bridge Road; 41°44′27″N 72°19′23″W	Coventry	
31	Augustus Post House	Augustus Post House	June 28, 1982 (#82004387)	4 Main Street; 41°39′28″N 72°21′59″W	Hebron	
32	Rockville Historic District	Rockville Historic District	September 13, 1984 (#84001173)	Roughly bounded by Snipsic Street, Davis Avenue, and West and South Streets; 41°51′51″N 72°27′04″W	Vernon	
33	Saxony Mill	Saxony Mill	November 10, 1983 (#83003592)	66 West Street; 41°51′58″N 72°27′56″W	Vernon	Destroyed by fire in 1994.
34	Sharpe's Trout Hatchery Site	Sharpe's Trout Hatchery Site	March 31, 1997 (#97000274)	Valley Falls Park; 41°49′16″N 72°26′38″W	Vernon	
35	Somers Historic District	Somers Historic District	September 23, 1982 (#82004389)	Main and Battle Streets, Bugbee Lane, and Springfield Road; 41°59′07″N 72°26′48″W	Somers	
36	Somersville Historic District	Somersville Historic District	April 13, 1995 (#95000401)	Roughly along Main, Maple and School Streets, Pinney and Shaker Road and Quality Avenue; 41°58′52″N 72°29′24″W	Somers	
37	South Coventry Historic District	South Coventry Historic District	May 6, 1991 (#91000482)	Roughly Main Street and adjacent Streets from Armstrong Road to Lake Street and Lake from High Street to Main; 41°46′05″N 72°18′07″W	Coventry	
38	South Willington Historic District	South Willington Historic District	November 30, 2017 (#100001860)	River Rd. roughly Battye Road to Fisher Hill Road; Pinney Hill Road, Village & Center Streets; 41°51′07″N 72°18′06″W	Willington	
39	Elias Sprague House	Elias Sprague House	November 2, 1987 (#87001910)	2187 South Street; 41°45′56″N 72°20′29″W	Coventry	
40	Spring Hill Historic District	Spring Hill Historic District	October 10, 1979 (#08000500)	Roughly along Storrs Road; 41°47′23″N 72°13′39″W	Mansfield	
41	Stafford Hollow Historic District	Stafford Hollow Historic District	October 15, 1987 (#87002032)	Roughly parts of Leonard, Murphy, Old Monson, Orcuttville, and Patten Roads; 41°59′08″N 72°17′26″W	Stafford	
42	Stafford Springs Historic District	Stafford Springs Historic District	April 17, 2025 (#100011768)	East Main Street, Furnace Avenue, Main Street, Highland Terrace, River Road, Silver Street, Spring Street; 41°57′13″N 72°18′11″W	Stafford	
43	Strong House	Strong House	January 15, 1988 (#87001906)	2382 South Street; 41°45′58″N 72°20′55″W	Coventry	
44	Talcottville Historic District	Talcottville Historic District	January 5, 1989 (#88002959)	13-44 Elm Hill Road and 11-132 Main Street; 41°49′12″N 72°29′51″W	Vernon	
45	Tolland County Courthouse	Tolland County Courthouse	September 17, 1977 (#09000084)	53 Tolland Green; 41°52′18″N 72°22′11″W	Tolland	
46	Tolland Green Historic District	Tolland Green Historic District	August 1, 1997 (#97000832)	Roughly along Old Post, Tolland Stage, and Cider Mill Roads; 41°52′11″N 72°22′36″W	Tolland	
47	Union Green Historic District	Union Green Historic District	July 19, 1990 (#90001099)	Roughly the area north of the Junction of Buckley Highway and Cemetery Road to the Junction of Kinney Hollow and Town Hall Roads; 41°59′23″N 72°09′36″W	Union	
48	University of Connecticut Historic District-Connecticut Agricultural School	University of Connecticut Historic District-Connecticut Agricultural School	January 31, 1989 (#88003202)	Roughly CT 195/Storrs Road at Eagleville Road; 41°48′29″N 72°15′03″W	Mansfield	
49	Valley Falls Cotton Mill Site	Valley Falls Cotton Mill Site	March 28, 1997 (#97000276)	Valley Falls Park; 41°49′16″N 72°26′37″W	Vernon	
50	White's Tavern	White's Tavern	July 26, 1991 (#91000947)	131 U.S. Route 6; 41°45′12″N 72°23′51″W	Andover	
51	Eleazer Williams House	Eleazer Williams House	March 11, 1971 (#71000910)	Storrs Road (Route 195); 41°46′01″N 72°11′58″W	Mansfield	
52	Willington Common Historic District	Willington Common Historic District	December 18, 1990 (#90001911)	Properties around Willington Common and East on the Tolland Turnpike past Old Farms Road; 41°52′31″N 72°15′52″W	Willington	

== See also ==
- List of National Historic Landmarks in Connecticut
- National Register of Historic Places listings in Connecticut
