= Oliver White Tavern =

Historic tavern in Connecticut, United States

- U.S. National Register of Historic Places
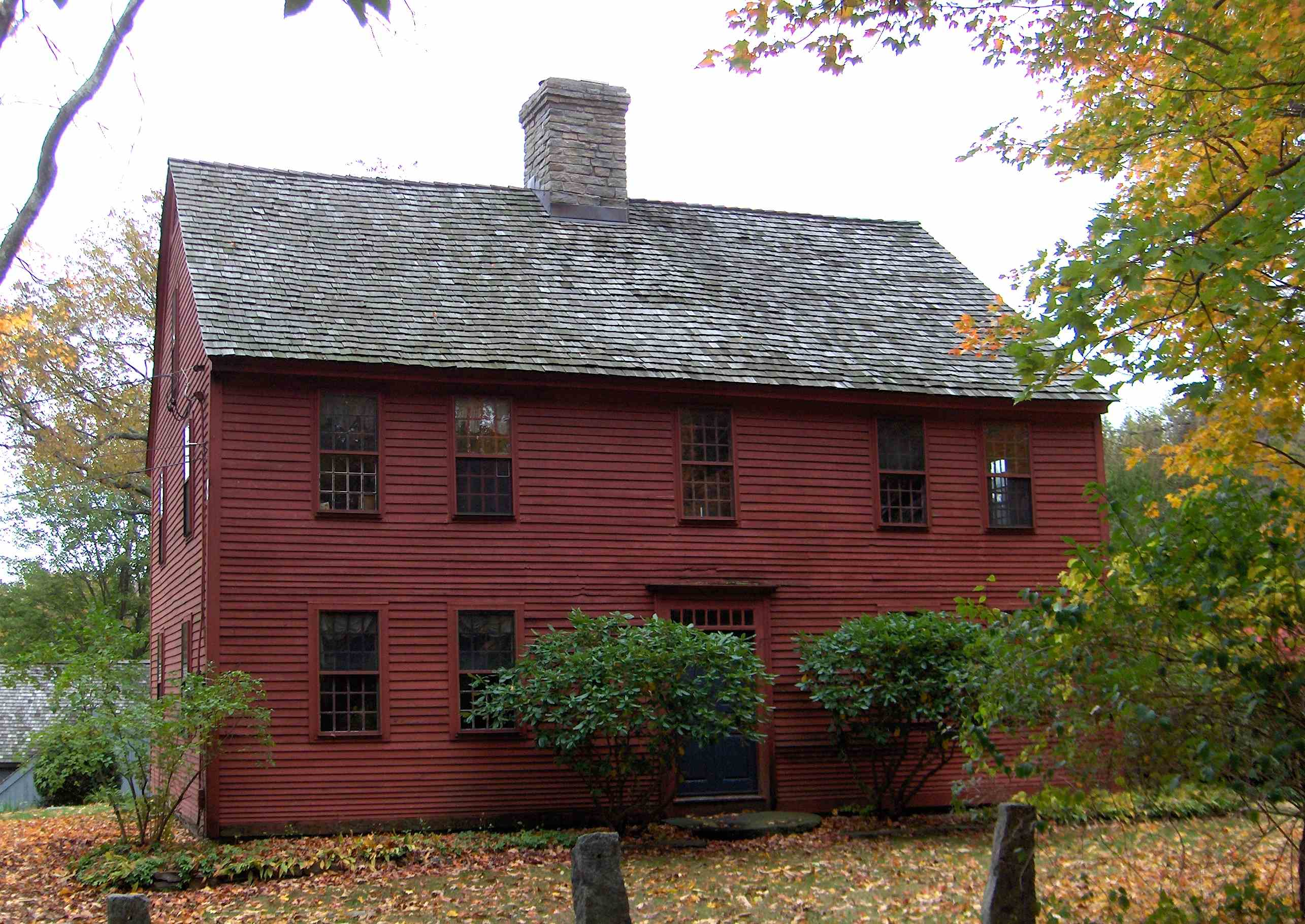

- Location within Connecticut Location within the United States
- Location: 2 Brandy Street, Bolton, Connecticut
- Coordinates: 41°46′11″N 72°25′29″W
- Area: 2.9 acres (1.2 ha)
- Built: 1750
- Architectural style: Postmedieval English
- MPS: Rochambeau's Army in Connecticut, 1780-1782 MPS
- NRHP reference No.: 02000422
- Added to NRHP: May 06, 2002

The Oliver White Tavern is a historic former tavern at 2 Brandy Street in Bolton, Connecticut. Built approximately 1750 as a residence, it is a good example of Georgian architecture. The tavern is historically significant because of its association with the march of Rochambeau's army during the American Revolutionary War, on their way to the Battle of Yorktown. The building, now a private residence, was listed on the National Register of Historic Places in 2002.

== Description and history ==
The former Oliver White Tavern is located a short way east of the village center of Bolton, at the southeast corner of Bolton Center Road and Brandy Street. The house is oriented facing west, toward the town center, and is directly across the street from a large field. It is a 2 1/2-story wood-frame structure, with a gabled roof, center chimney, and clapboarded exterior. Its main facade is five bays wide, with a center entrance topped by a seven-light transom window, and framed by simple stepped moulding.

The tavern was built about 1750, and is a well-preserved example of domestic Georgian architecture. The land where the house stands was purchased by Oliver White in 1741. He sold the land with a house in 1743. It was used as a dwelling until sometime between 1753 and 1764, when it was converted for use to a tavern. The building was no long owned by Oliver White when it became a tavern, but it was traditional at that time to keep the original owner's name even after sale, so it became known as the Oliver White Tavern.

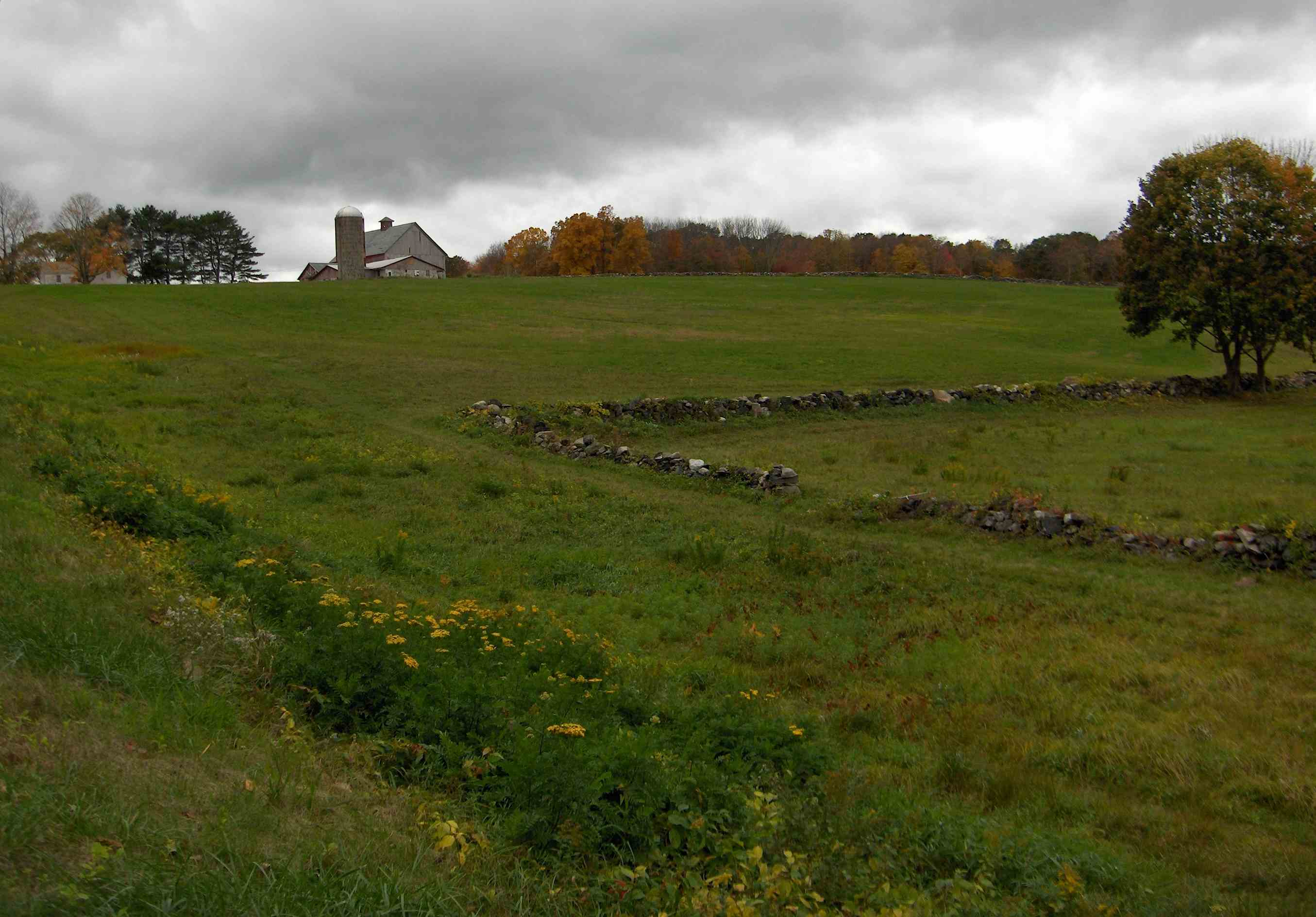
Encampment site of Rochambeau's army

The tavern is significant for its association with the historic march of the French Army from Providence, Rhode Island to Yorktown, Virginia in 1781. Records show that the army made its fifth camp in the field across Bolton Center Road. A map prepared by French engineers identifies a building at this site, marked as a tavern. It was typical of the period for soldiers to camp in the fields, with officers typically housed in local taverns or houses of prominent local residents.

== See also ==
- White's Tavern, also on the Rochambeau route in nearby Andover
- March Route of Rochambeau's army
- List of historic sites preserved along Rochambeau's route
- National Register of Historic Places listings in Tolland County, Connecticut
