= Fifth Camp of Rochambeau's Infantry =

- U.S. National Register of Historic Places
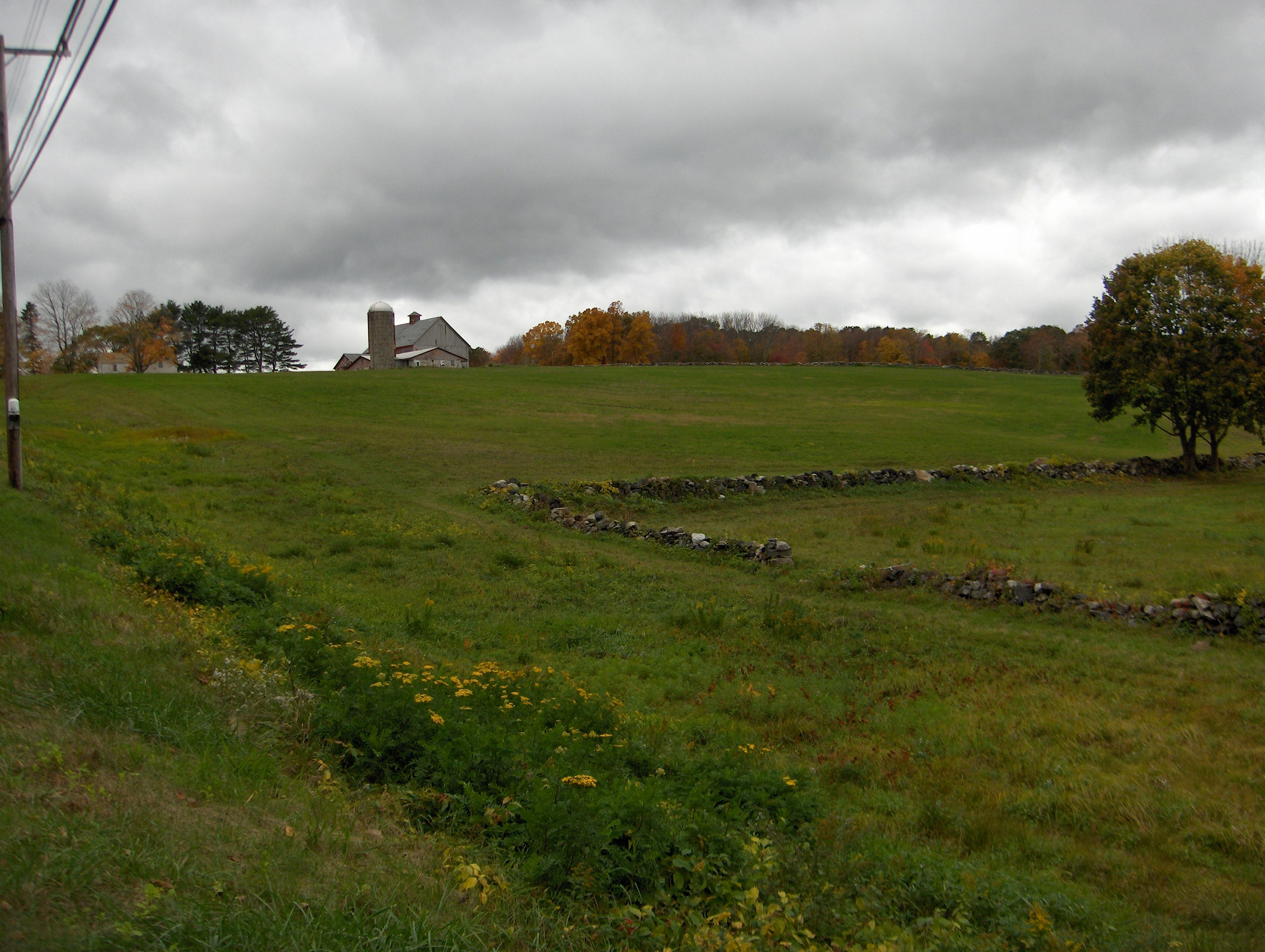

- Location within Connecticut Location within the United States
- Location: Bolton Heritage Farm, Bolton, Connecticut
- Coordinates: 41°46′13.6″N 72°25′39.8″W
- Area: 13 acres (5.3 ha)
- Built: 1781
- NRHP reference No.: 01000446
- Added to NRHP: April 30, 2001

The Fifth Camp of Rochambeau's Infantry, also known as Site 12-25, is a historic site and an archeological site in Bolton, Connecticut, on the march route of Rochambeau's army on its way to the Hudson River and ultimately to Yorktown, Virginia. It was used on four successive nights, the 22nd through the 25th of June, 1781, by the four divisions of Rochambeau's army (the Bourbonnais, the Royal Deux-Ponts, the Soissonnais, and the Saintonge). In the evenings, the French entertained locals by playing music and dancing with local women, on Bolton Green.

About 1 mile (1.6 km) before the Fifth Camp is March Route of Rochambeau's Army: Bailey Road, and about a mile before that is March Route of Rochambeau's Army: Hutchinson Road, both on the way from Andover, and both also NRHP-listed. The road to the Fifth Camp was described as "frightful". The Bourbonnais division had to bivouac without its tents, as its supply wagons were delayed on the poor roads.

It is a 13-acre (5.3 ha) site that was listed on the National Register of Historic Places in 2001.

The site is listed for its information potential. According to a study completed in 2001, the site "is an open field that retains its visual qualities, with stone walls marking the same field lines as shown on the map prepared by the French engineers. The camp was occupied for four nights in a row, one night by each regiment, in June, 1781. A large number of artifacts have been recovered to date, including numbered regimental buttons, .66 caliber musket balls, period coins, and a lead bar."

The camp site was not used on the return march in 1782; the 46th camp site was at a different location in what is now Andover which was then part of Bolton.

== See also ==
- Daniel White Tavern, adjacent
- March Route of Rochambeau's army
- List of historic sites preserved along Rochambeau's route
- National Register of Historic Places listings in Tolland County, Connecticut
