= Augustus Post House =

Historic house in Connecticut, United States

- U.S. National Register of Historic Places
- U.S. Historic district – Contributing property
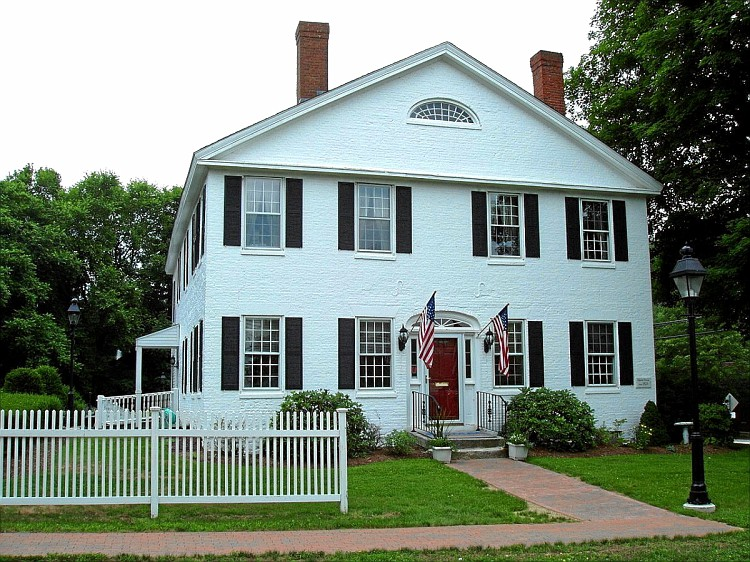

- Location within Connecticut Location within the United States
- Location: 4 Main Street, Hebron, Connecticut
- Coordinates: 41.6577°N 72.3656°W
- Area: 0.8 acres (0.32 ha)
- Built: c. 1820 and 1978
- Architectural style: Federal
- Part of: Hebron Center Historic District (ID93000649)
- NRHP reference No.: 82004387

Significant dates
- Added to NRHP: June 28, 1982; 44 years ago
- Designated CP: July 30, 1993; 33 years ago

The Augustus Post House, also known as Hewitt House, is a historic house in Hebron, Connecticut. Built about 1820, it is a prominent local example of Federal period architecture, whose occupants have included prominent local businessmen and one Governor of Connecticut. It was listed on the National Register of Historic Places in 1982.

== Description and history ==
The Augustus Post House is located in the village of Hebron, at the southeast corner of Main and Church Streets. It faces north toward a surviving segment of Hebron's village green. It is a 2 1/2-story brick house, four bays wide, with a front gable roof and four chimneys. The main facade has windows in each bay, with then main entrance sandwiched between the center two bays. It is flanked by sidelight windows and topped by a semi-elliptical fanlight window. A wood-frame ell extends to the building's rear. The interior has retained significant original handiwork despite its adaptation for use as professional offices.

Built c. 1820, it is locally significant as a fine example of vernacular Federal style architecture. The Augustus Post for whom it is named was Capt. Ezekiel Augustus Post (1775-1854) who fought as part of the Massachusetts Volunteer Militia in the war of 1812. Post, a craftsman, married three times and had a total of seventeen children, fourteen of whom survived into adulthood and three of whom bore the name Augustus. He was also grandfather to Augustus Post the aviation and automotive pioneer who founded the American Automobile Association.

Capt. Post may have overextended himself in the construction of the house. He sold it in 1824 to the mortgage holder, a local merchant. The house went through a significant number of owners in the 19th century, one of whom was John S. Peters, a businessman who served as Governor of Connecticut 1831–33. From the late 19th century to the 1970s it was owned by the Hewitt family, who operated a nearby general store.

== See also ==
- National Register of Historic Places listings in Tolland County, Connecticut
