= Abington Congregational Church =

Historic church in Connecticut

- U.S. National Register of Historic Places
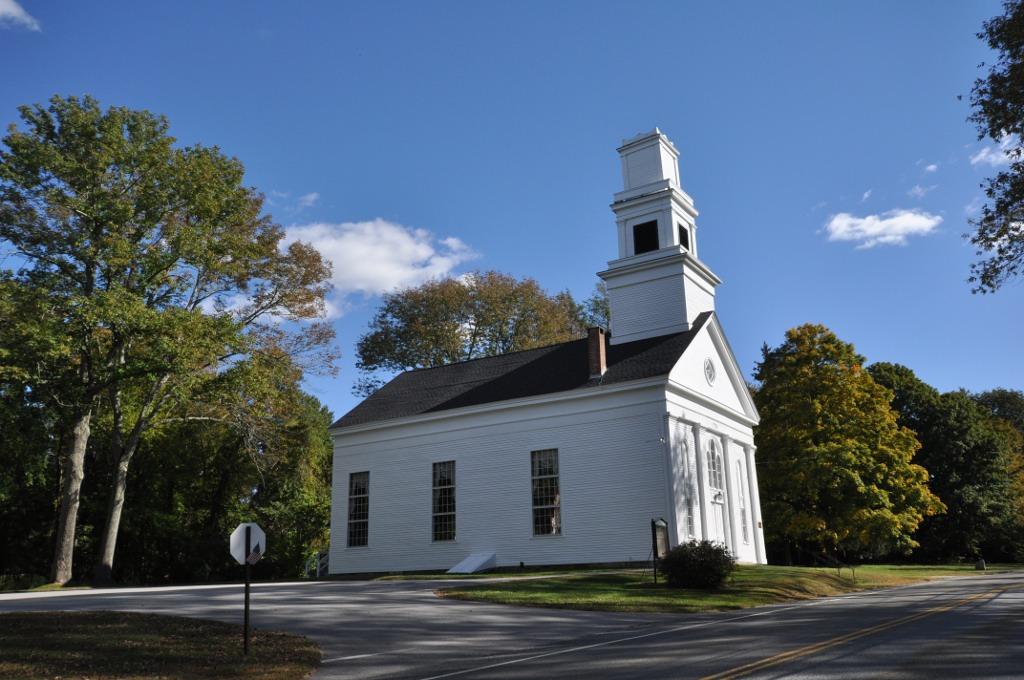

- Location within Connecticut Location within the United States
- Location: CT 97, Abington, Connecticut, in town of Pomfret, Connecticut
- Coordinates: 41°51′27″N 72°0′29″W
- Area: 1 acre (0.40 ha)
- Built: 1751
- Architect: Edwin Fitch
- Architectural style: Greek Revival, Greek Revival Vernacular
- NRHP reference No.: 77001413
- Added to NRHP: September 19, 1977

The Abington Congregational Church is a historic church on Connecticut Route 97 in the Abington village of Pomfret, Connecticut. It was built in 1751 and restyled in the 1830s, and it is the oldest ecclesiastical building in the State of Connecticut that has been continuously used for religious purposes. It was included on the National Register of Historic Places in 1977.

== Description ==
The Abington Congregational Church is located in the rural village of Abington, on the east side of Route 97, south of its junction with United States Route 44. It is a single-story wood-frame structure, with a gabled roof and clapboarded exterior. The main facade is three bays wide, the bays articulated by Doric pilasters, and topped by a pedimented gable that is flushboarded, with a round window at the center. A three-stage square tower rises above the entrance.

== History ==
The church was built in 1751 for a congregation established in 1749 after the main Pomfret congregation grew too large. It is one of the few surviving examples of the peg and beam construction typical of 18th century New England. The building was significantly enlarged and altered in the 1830s, giving it its present Greek Revival styling; this work was one by Edwin Fitch of Mansfield. A parsonage for the church was built in 1851, and an adjacent parish hall was built in 1951.

Today the church is the spiritual home to a small congregation, and is a member of the United Church of Christ. Its website includes records of interest to genealogists and historians. The Old Cemetery of the Abington Church was used from 1760 to 1900, and includes gravestones of 82 American Revolutionary War soldiers. The New Cemetery includes many Civil War gravemarkers, and is still in use today. Lists from both cemeteries are included on the church's website, as well as a record of all Civil War veterans and units from Pomfret, Connecticut.

The current pastor is the Reverend Bruce A. Hedman, Ph.D., who graduated from Princeton Theological Seminary and was ordained to the Presbyterian ministry in 1980. He served churches in Philadelphia, Pennsylvania, and in Union, Connecticut and Hampton, Connecticut, before coming to Abington in 1988.

== See also ==
- List of the oldest churches in the United States
- National Register of Historic Places listings in Windham County, Connecticut
