= Christopher Larkin (actor) =

American actor (born 1987/1988)

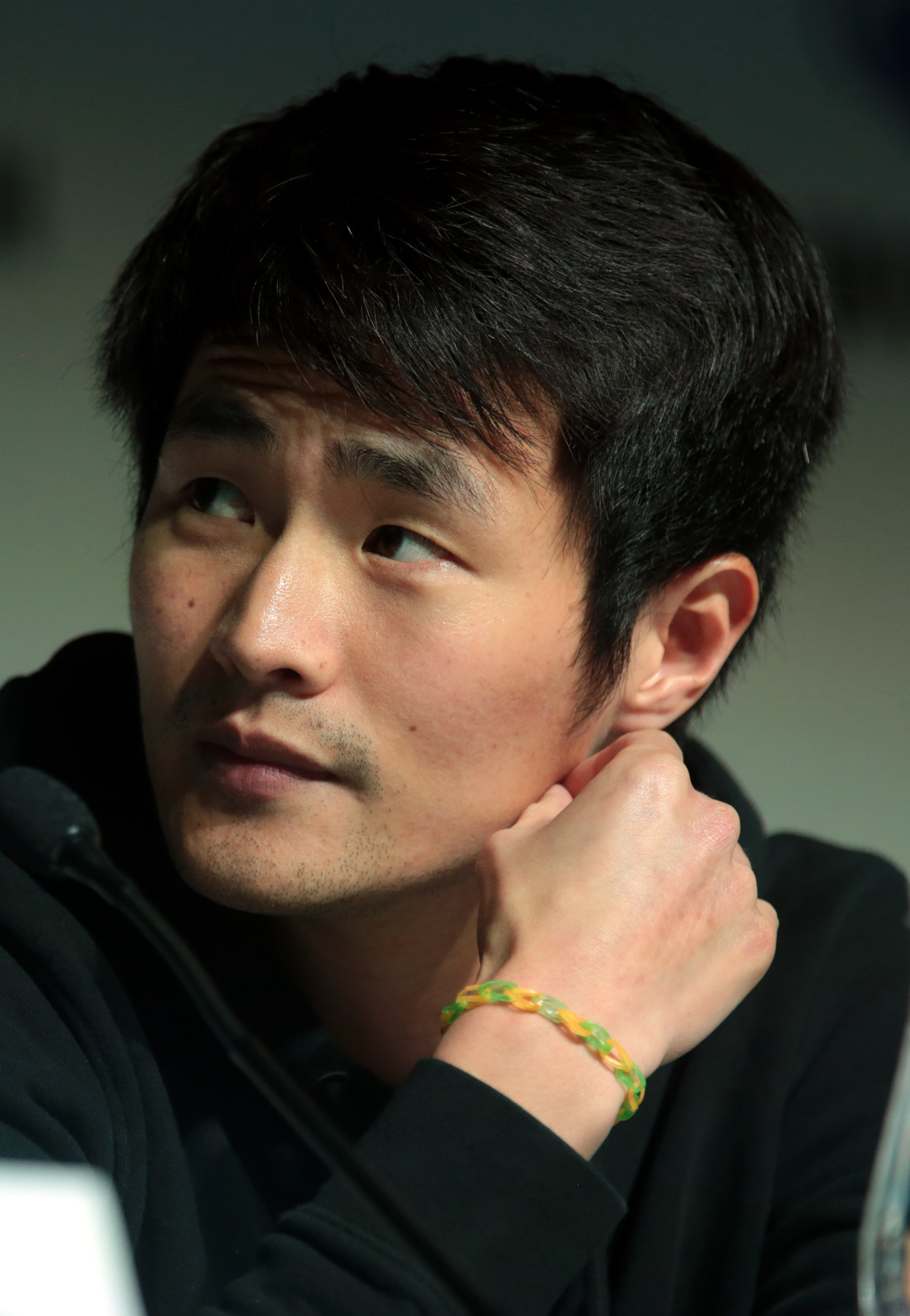
- Larkin at the 2018 WonderCon
- Born: Christopher John Larkin; 1987 or 1988 (age 38–39); Daegu, South Korea
- Education: Fordham University
- Occupations: Actor, musician
- Years active: 2001–present

Christopher Larkin (born 1987/1988) is an American actor. He is best known for playing the role of Monty Green on the CW series The 100.

== Early life ==
Christopher John Larkin was born in 1987 or 1988 in Daegu, South Korea, and is of Korean descent. He was adopted by an Irish father and a French-Canadian mother at four months old. He grew up in Hebron, Connecticut, US, and his upbringing was rich with his father's Irish culture. Christopher was a competitive Irish step-dancer throughout his youth – nationally ranked – and cites his first dream as wanting to be "the Asian American lead on Riverdance." He began acting in his middle school's drama program, and obtained his first professional role in 2000 as the lead in Hallmark Hall of Fame's Flamingo Rising. He also began playing guitar after being gifted one by his grandfather.

After graduating from both RHAM High School and the Greater Hartford Academy of the Arts in 2005, Larkin attended Fordham University's campus at Lincoln Center in New York City. He made his off-Broadway debut in his sophomore year of college and took off the fall semester of his senior year to play the title character in Steppenwolf Theatre Company's production of Kafka on the Shore in Chicago, Illinois. Larkin graduated with his theater degree in 2009 and moved to LA in 2012 in hopes of finding more acting opportunities.

== Music ==
In 2011, Christopher Larkin founded the band d'Artagnon with friend Wade Allain-Marcus. D'Artagnon has released one studio album entitled A-side. Off this album, their song "Confession" was featured in episode 2x06 of the 100 and was named winner of the 2012 Red Bull Soundstage Competition, as well as being on the soundtrack of the film We Made This Movie. Nowadays, Larkin releases music under the moniker Carry Hatchet. He self-released his debut album The News Today on September 29, 2015. His second album, The Happiest Album Ever Made, was released on November 13, 2017, with "Julien" and "Grey Blues" released early as singles. He also released a music video for "Grey Blues". His third album, "Jayne Schmayne", was released May 4, 2021. Off that album, the songs "Round and Round", "Theo", and "Only a Fool" were released early as singles with accompanying music videos. His fourth album, "Han", was released on October 10, 2023. "Coppelia" was released as a single with a music video on September 27, 2023. "Han" was also released as a single with a music video on October 3, 2023.

== Acting ==
=== Film ===
Year	Title	Role
2001	The Flamingo Rising	Abraham Jacob Lee
2005	Strangers With Candy	Kim (uncredited)
2006	The Big Bad Swim	Cashier

=== Theatre ===
Opening Date	Title	Role
May 3, 2007	Back From The Front	Robbi Walker
October 12, 2007	Always Family	Stanford
September 18, 2008	Kafka on the Shore	Kafka
August 18, 2010	When Last We Flew	Ian
October 28, 2010	Futura	Gash
November 15, 2011	The Sugar House at the End of the Wilderness	Han
March 17, 2014	Fast Company	Francis
March 2015	Oblivion	Bernard
March 19, 2019	Wolf Play	Wolf
May 22, 2019	Nomad Motel	Mason

=== Television ===
Year	Title	Role	Notes
2008	One Life to Live	Dan	Episode: "Gift Horse"
2012	Squad 85	Bobby	6 episodes
2013	90210	Kent	Episode: "#realness"
2013	Awkward	Neutral Party	Episode: "Karmic Relief"
2014–2019	The 100	Monty Green	Main (season 1–5), guest (season 6); 53 episodes
2016	Kingdom Geek	Himself	Episode: "Christopher Larkin"
2018	GeekRockTV	Himself	Episode: "WonderCon Anaheim 2018 – (Highlights)"
2019	Tales of the City	Jonathan "Raven" Winter	7 episodes
2022	The Orville	Timmis	Season 3; Episode 7: "From Unknown Graves"
