= Andover Center Historic District =

Historic district in Connecticut, United States

- U.S. National Register of Historic Places
- U.S. Historic district
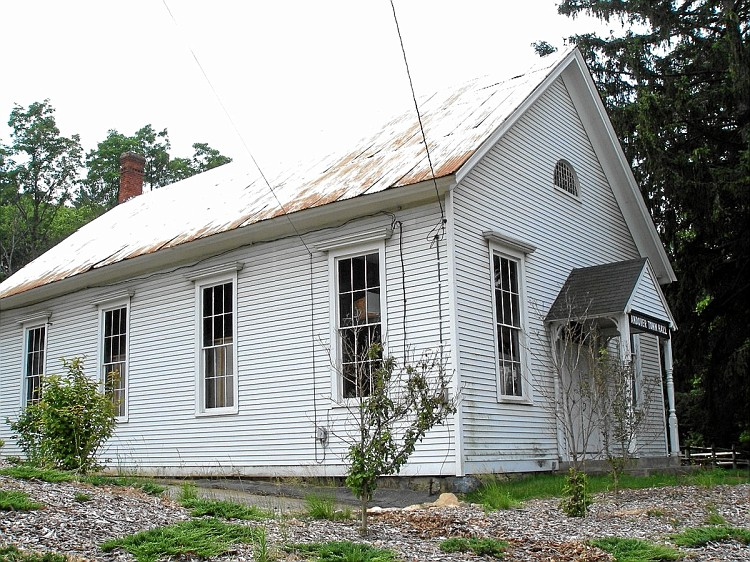
- The former town hall, now the historic society museum

- Location within Connecticut Location within the United States
- Location: Roughly along Herbron Road, Boston Hill Road, and US 6, Andover, Connecticut
- Coordinates: 41°44′3″N 72°22′30″W
- Area: 270 acres (110 ha)
- Architectural style: Colonial, Federal
- NRHP reference No.: 03000236
- Added to NRHP: April 18, 2003

The Andover Center Historic District encompasses the historic town center of Andover, Connecticut. Centered on the junction of Hebron Road with Center Street and Cider Mill Road, the district includes houses dating to the town's early history, civic buildings including a library and former town hall, and the town's first cemetery. The district was listed on the National Register of Historic Places in 2003.

== Description and history ==
The central Connecticut town of Andover was established as a separate Congregational parish, mainly out of portions of Hebron and Coventry, in 1748, but was not incorporated until a century later. The location where its first meeting house was built was near its geographic center, on Hebron Road between Center Street and Boston Hill Road. The village benefited economically in the early 19th century from the early establishment of a small flaxseed oil mill, and by the establishment of the Hartford-Norwich Turnpike, which ran along portions of Center Street and Hebron Road, and the later routing of a railroad line just north of the village. Many of the town's commercial and civic functions were relocated to the US 6 corridor in the mid-20th century.

The historic district is 270 acres (110 ha) in size, and includes buildings on Hebron Road, Center Street, Boston Hill Road, Cider Mill Road, and US 6. The district includes 60 contributing buildings, 2 contributing sites, and 4 contributing structures. It includes the town's first cemetery (established 1750), and five 18th-century houses, including the Georgian Phelps-Bingham House, built in 1740. Later buildings include the Greek Revival John Bingham House (1840), and the 1833 Greek Revival First Congregational Church.

== See also ==
- North Andover Center Historic District, North Andover, Massachusetts
- National Register of Historic Places listings in Tolland County, Connecticut
