= Peters House (Hebron, Connecticut) =

Historic building in Connecticut, U.S.

Coordinates: 41°40′53″N 72°23′25″W

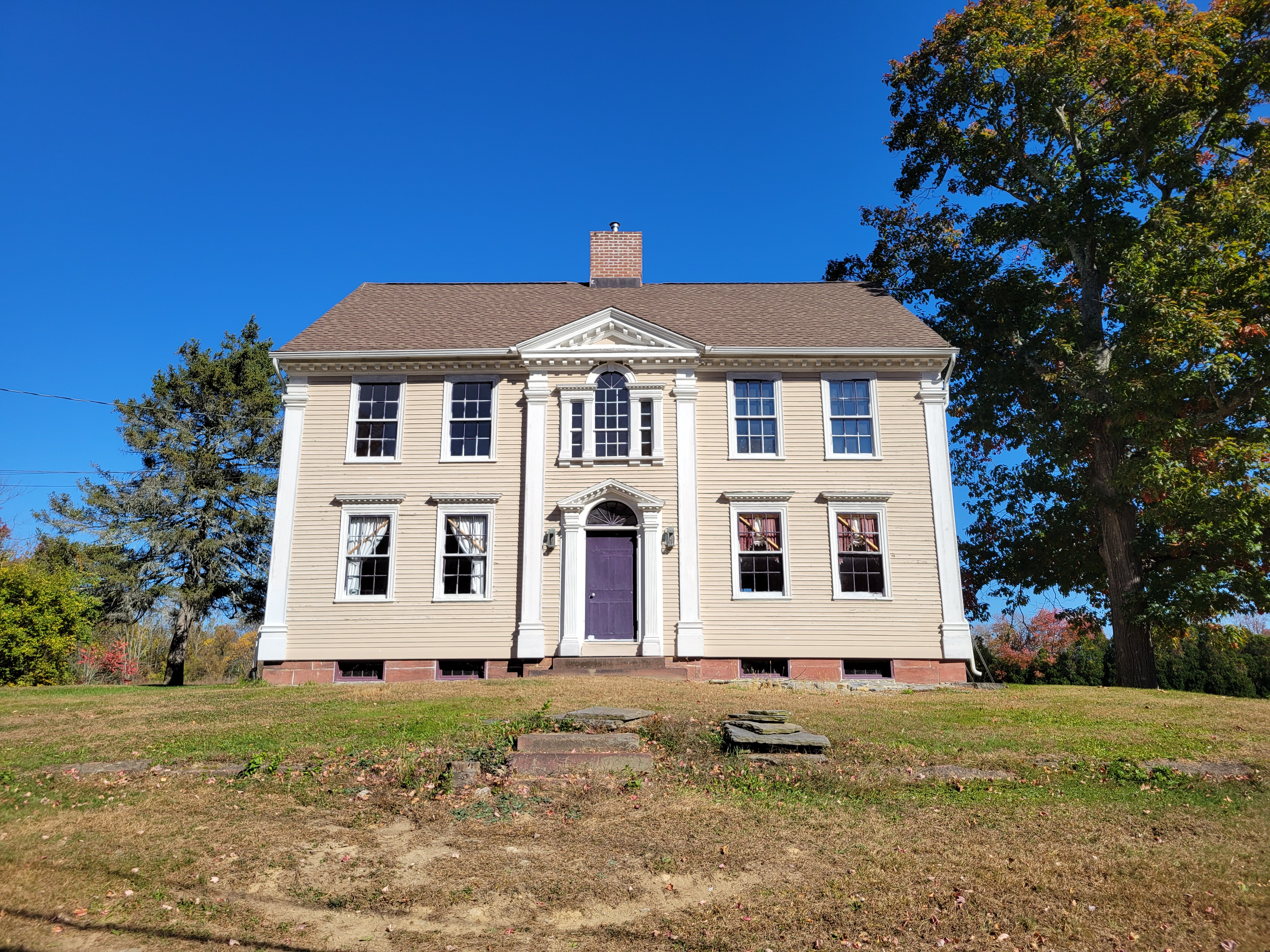
Peters House

The Peters House is a historic house located at 150 East Street in Hebron, Connecticut. The house, built in the mid-eighteenth century, stands at the entrance of Burnt Hill Park, the largest municipal park in Hebron. The house was recently added to The Connecticut Freedom Trail, which documents and designates sites that embody the struggle toward freedom and human dignity as well as celebrate the accomplishments of the state's African American community

== Historical significance ==
The Peters House was home to enslaved African-American residents Cesar and Lowis Peters, with the house being owned by Rev. Samuel Peters.

In September 1774, the aforementioned Samuel Peters fled Hebron for London, England. His Anglicanism in a majority Congregationalist Connecticut, in combination with his loyalty to the British crown, alienated him from the community as well as jeopardized his security. The property was left to Cesar Peters to tend to, although it was shortly thereafter seized by the newly created state's attorney of Connecticut. After the Revolutionary War, Rev. Samuel Peters, still living in England, sold off his American assets, which included Cesar and his wife and children. They were sold to David Prior of South Carolina, who sent six heavily armed men to retrieve the family. The men forcibly entered the house and grabbed the family, intent on selling them to cover some pressing debts

The townspeople did not take kindly to this action, however, and hatched a clever plan to rescue the family. Elijah Graves, a local tailor, filed a complaint claiming that Cesar and his family left town without paying for some articles of clothing. After issuing a warrant for the family's arrest, authorities quickly set out for Norwich, Connecticut in an attempt to overtake the family's abductors. Catching up with them not long before they intended to load the family onto a ship bound for South Carolina, the constable presented the warrant for arrest, took Cesar and his family into custody, and promptly returned them to Hebron. In January 1789, after the state's General Assembly reviewed a series of petitions and depositions filed to free Cesar and his family from slavery, the state finally emancipated them

The house was acquired by the Town of Hebron in 2004, with the surrounding land being transformed into Burnt Hill Park, the largest municipal park in Hebron

== Architecture and features ==
The Peters House is a blend of traditional and high-style, although it also incorporates aspects of Late Georgian or Federal style. The Peters House consists of two sections. The rear ell was built in the mid-eighteenth century, with the front part of the house most likely being built by Jonathan Peters, brother to Rev. Samuel Peters, around 1795. The front of the house sports an elegant entrance pavilion with monumental Doric pillars. A ballroom is located on the second floor with grand, high ceilings and original window seats along one wall, where guests would likely have stowed their outer garments

=== Unique features ===
An upstairs room reveals at least five different layers of wallpaper when peeled back. Each layer harkens back to a different era in the House's more than 200-year history.

Revealed beneath old linoleum in the home's front parlor is a newspaper from 1941, laid between the original wide-pine floors and an underlayer of plywood. The newspaper contains an advertisement, indicative of the time period, for a new General Electric refrigerator, which could be purchased for a mere $124.95.

Located above the front entrance, between two Doric pillars is a three-part Palladian Window.
