= South Willington Historic District =

Historic district in Connecticut, United States

- U.S. National Register of Historic Places
- U.S. Historic district
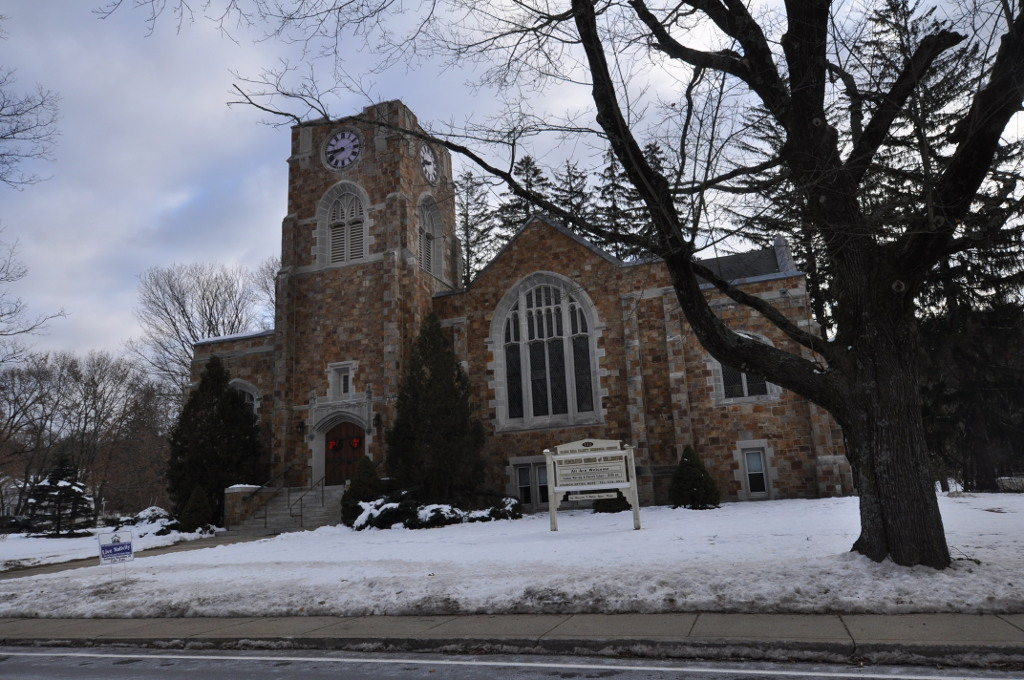

- Location within Connecticut Location within the United States
- Location: River Road roughly Battye Road to Fisher Hill Road; Pinney Hill Road, Village & Center Streets, Willington, Connecticut
- Coordinates: 41.85307°N 72.30126°W
- Area: 88 acres (36 ha)
- Architectural style: Colonial Revival, Late Victorian, Craftsman/Bungalow
- NRHP reference No.: 100001860
- Added to NRHP: November 30, 2017

The South Willington Historic District is a historic district encompassing the historic village of South Willington in the town of Willington, Connecticut. The village, mostly stretched along Connecticut Route 32, developed as a 19th-century industrial mill village associated with the Gardiner Hall Jr. Company. The district was listed on the National Register of Historic Places in 2017.

== Description and history ==
South Willington's industrial history began in 1840, when Origen Hall and two partners founded the Willington Thread Company. Hall and his brother Gardner founded a second company in 1848 for the production of cotton wadding and batting. After several failed business ventures, Gardiner Hall founded the Hall Thread Company in 1860, building what is now the oldest surviving industrial building in the village. This venture also failed due to a lack of cotton occasioned by the American Civil War, but Hall restarted the business in 1867. This business flourished, operating at the site until 1954. The Halls practiced a paternalistic form of management and care of the mill workers, building a school and church, as well as housing for their workers. The company's success was instrumental in the village's growth during the late 19th and early 20th centuries.

The historic district is roughly linear, extending along River Road (Connecticut Route 32), from Fisher Hill Road in the north to the southern junction with Battye Road in the south. It widens to include Village Street, which runs parallel to River Road and is mostly lined with worker housing. The visual centerpieces of the district are the mill complex and Hall's Pond, the Colonial Revival Hall Memorial School, and the Gothic Revival Clara Hall Elliott Memorial Church (1911). Several high-quality homes, built mainly by the mill owners in the mid-to-late 19th century, line a portion of River Road. At the corner with Depot Street is a large bank barn with cupola, built by the company about 1885.

== See also ==
- National Register of Historic Places listings in Tolland County, Connecticut
