= The Flamingo Rising =

2001 film by Martha Coolidge

- Movie cover
- Based on: The Flamingo Rising by Larry Baker
- Written by: Richard Russo
- Directed by: Martha Coolidge
- Starring: William Hurt; Elizabeth McGovern; Brian Benben; Christopher Larkin
- Music by: David Newman
- Original language: English

Production
- Producers: Brent Shields; Robert Bennett Steinhauer; Richard Welsh
- Cinematography: Johnny E. Jensen
- Editor: David Finfer
- Running time: 94 minutes

Original release
- Network: CBS
- Release: February 4, 2001

The Flamingo Rising is a 2001 dramatic film in the Hallmark Hall of Fame released on CBS in February 2001, and based on the novel The Flamingo Rising written by Larry Baker in 1997. The movie stars Christopher Larkin, William Hurt, Elizabeth McGovern, and Brian Benben. The movie focuses on the feud between a funeral parlor owner and a man who wants to set up a large drive-in theatre across the street from the parlor. Former In the Heat of the Night star Randall Franks returned to CBS, which aired the film, in the cameo role of "Officer Randy Kraft."

== Cast ==
- William Hurt as Turner Knight
- Elizabeth McGovern as Edna Lee
- Brian Benben as Hubert Lee
- Angela Bettis as Alice King
- Joe Torry as Pete Moss
- Erin Broderick as Grace Knight
- Olivia Oguma as Louise Janine Lee
- Christopher Larkin as Abraham Jacob Lee
