= Eldredge Mills Archeological District =

Historic district in Connecticut, United States

- U.S. National Register of Historic Places
- U.S. Historic district
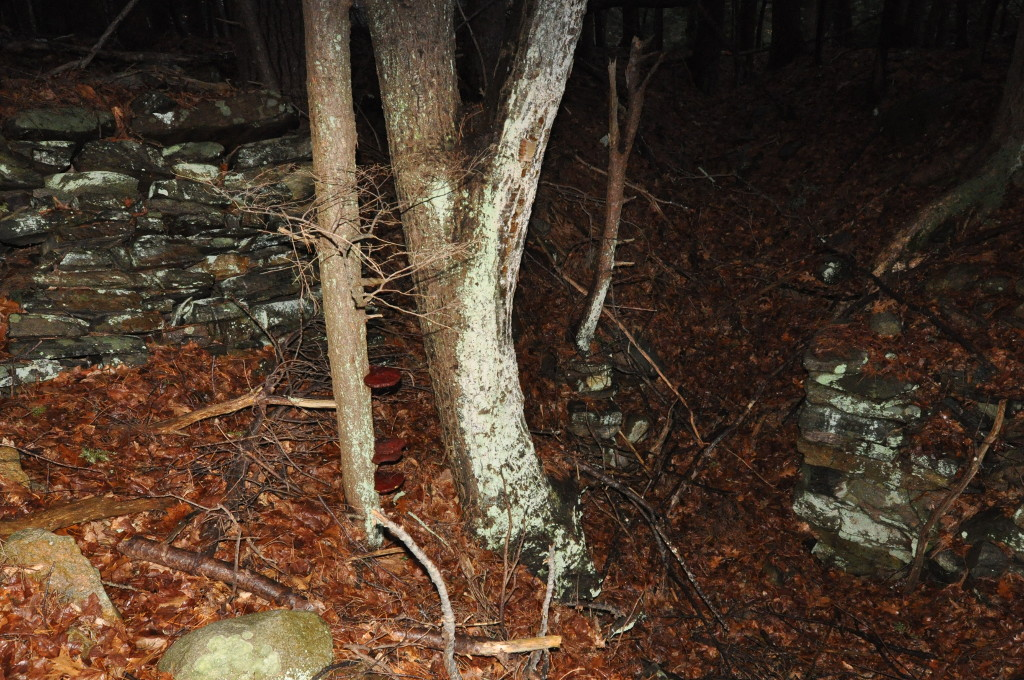
- Portions of the mill foundation
- Location: Address Restricted, Willington, Connecticut
- Area: 2.3 acres (0.93 ha)
- NRHP reference No.: 00000938
- Added to NRHP: October 20, 2000

Eldredge Mills Archeological District is a 2.3-acre (0.93 ha) historic district in Willington, Connecticut that was listed on the National Register of Historic Places in 2000. The property is also denoted Site No. 160-15.

Nehemiah Parker operated a grist mill at the location after acquiring it in 1750. Multiple mills were constructed during 1800–07. There were multiple millers and owners, but it became known as Eldredge Mills for Elijah Eldredge who bought three mills at the location in c.1812-13. Elijah and his family were the principal owners and operators on the site from 1813 to 1845, significantly expanding its operations. Most of the water-powered operations had ended by the turn of the 20th century, and the last mill to operate, a grist mill, shut down about 1925.

There were grist, saw, fulling, and shingle mills at the site. The site has been subjected to repeated flooding, resulting in the loss of many features. Foundational remnants of seven buildings survive, and the site of the former mill pond is also discernible, although the site is now completely wooded.

== See also ==
- National Register of Historic Places listings in Tolland County, Connecticut
