= Eleazer Williams House =

Historic house in Connecticut, United States

- U.S. National Register of Historic Places
- U.S. Historic district – Contributing property
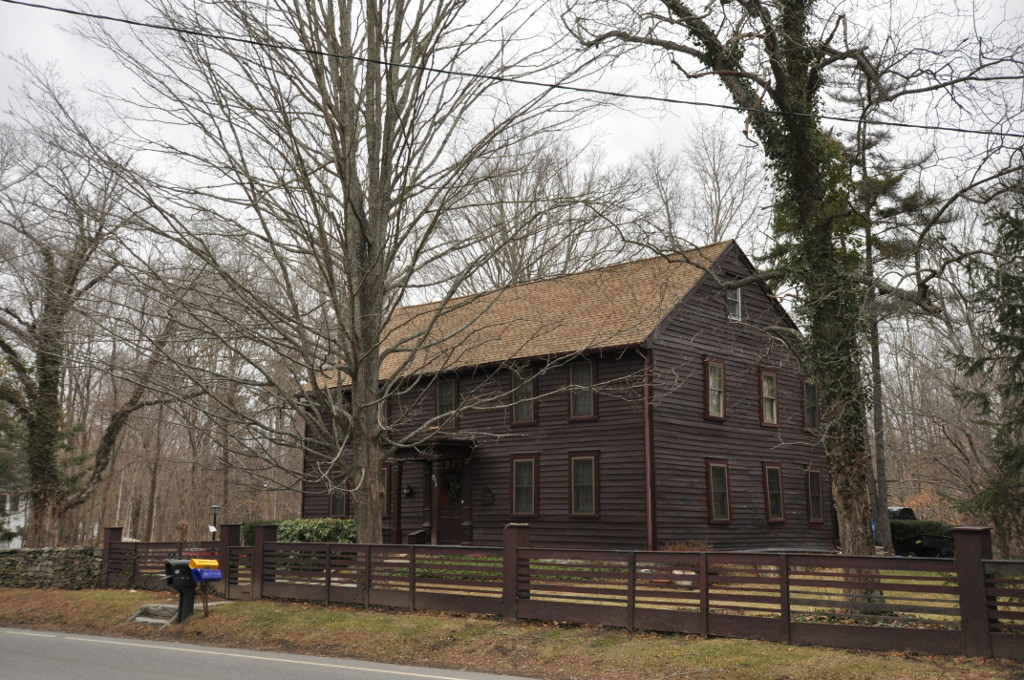

- Location within Connecticut Location within the United States
- Location: Storrs Road (Route 195), Mansfield Center, Connecticut
- Coordinates: 41°46′1″N 72°11′58″W
- Area: 1 acre (0.40 ha)
- Built: 1710, 1750–1775
- Architect: Georgian
- Part of: Mansfield Center Historic District (ID72001337)
- NRHP reference No.: 71000910

Significant dates
- Added to NRHP: March 11, 1971
- Designated CP: February 23, 1972

The Eleazer Williams House is a historic house in Mansfield Center, Connecticut, United States. It is located on Storrs Road (Connecticut Route 195) near the southeast corner of the junction with Dodd Road. Completed in 1710, it was the home of the town's first minister and has a well-preserved chronology of alteration, illustrating changing building practices over the 18th century. The house was listed on the National Register of Historic Places in 1971 and is included within the Mansfield Center Historic District.

== Description and history ==
The Eleazer Williams House is located in the village of Mansfield Center, on the east side of Storrs Road, south of its junction with Dodd Road. It is a 2 1/2-story wood-frame structure with a side-gable roof and clapboarded exterior. The clapboards probably date to the late 18th century and are fastened to the framing with hand-cut nails. Its main facade is five bays wide, with a center entrance sheltered by a multi-columned Colonial revival portico.

Construction on the house began in 1709 by Samuel Fuller but was completed in 1710 by the town, which purchased the unfinished structure from Fuller in 1710. It was built for the Reverend Eleazer Williams, son of the Deerfield, Massachusetts minister John Williams, and served as the town parsonage for 75 years. The house underwent significant remodeling between 1750 and 1775, giving it a more Georgian appearance with a saltbox shape. Around 1800, the house was again altered, raising the roof in the rear to a full two stories, and in 1853, the c. 1760 chimneys were removed. The house is considered an excellent showpiece of the evolutionary alteration of a colonial-era house over time.

== See also ==
- National Register of Historic Places listings in Tolland County, Connecticut
