= John Cady House =

Historic house in Connecticut, United States

- U.S. National Register of Historic Places
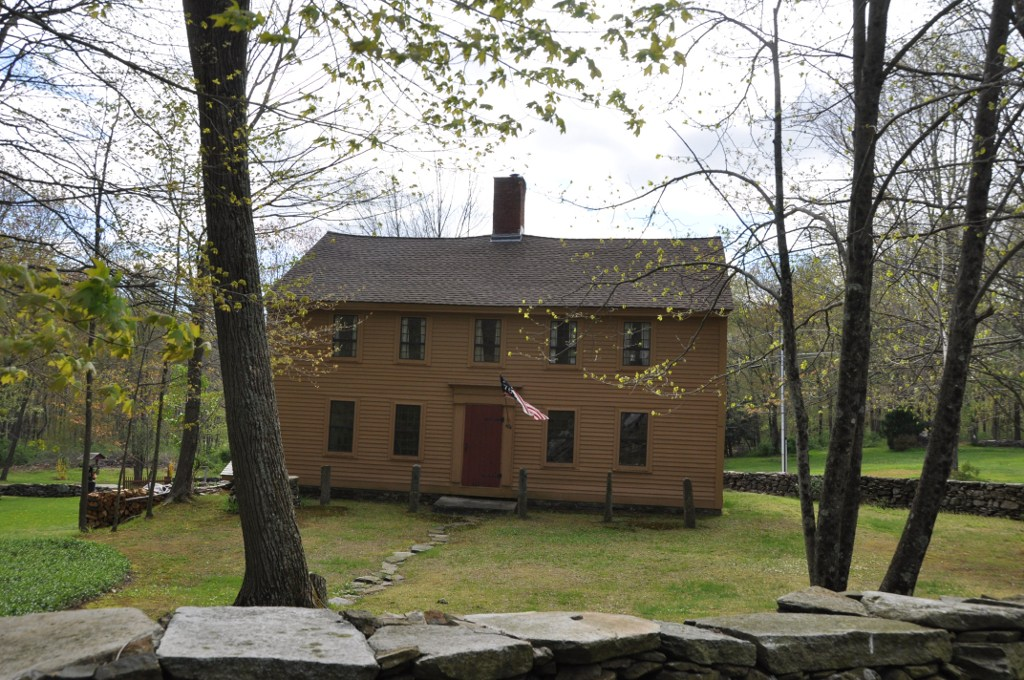

- Location within Connecticut Location within the United States
- Location: 484 Mile Hill Road, Tolland, Connecticut
- Coordinates: 41°49′51″N 72°24′0″W
- Area: 1 acre (0.40 ha)
- Built: c. 1753
- NRHP reference No.: 82004390
- Added to NRHP: April 12, 1982

The John Cady House, also known historically as the Babcock Tavern, is a historic house at 484 Mile Hill Road in Tolland, Connecticut. With a distinctive construction history dating to 1753, it serves as an important window into the construction methods and techniques of the 18th and 19th centuries. It was listed on the National Register of Historic Places in 1982.

== Description and history ==
The John Cady House stands in a rural residential area of southwestern Tolland, at the southwest corner of Mile Hill Road (Connecticut Route 31) and Cedar Swamp Road. It is a 2 1/2-story wood-frame structure, five bays wide, with a large central chimney. Its main entrance is centered on the front facade, framed by Greek Revival pilasters with a corniced entablature. Although its exterior is uniform, the building is structurally composed of two separate buildings which were butted together, leading to an interior layout that is unusual. The central chimney appears to have been modified at the time the two sections were joined, in order to accommodate a larger kitchen fireplace. The roof frame shows evidence that the house was once covered by a gambrel roof, instead of the present gable.

In 1729/30 about thirteen years after John Cady purchased the land for "twenty-eight pounds current money". He sold it for one hundred twenty-five pounds to Ebenezer Searls of Coventry on March 30, 1743. The land now has a better description and is in the amount of "forty-five acres more or less" Ebenezer then sells his land "with the buildings fences and improvements thereon" to Jonathan Weston of Norwich Oct 8, 1746. Elijah Weston was documented to operate a tavern here between 1794 and 1800. It is unknown where the name "Babcock Tavern", a historic 19th-century name, originates, since no Babcocks are documented as having lived in this area.

In August 2020 William A. Flynt of Dummerston Vt. performed a dendrochronology survey of the oldest part of the dwelling. The ten core samples yielded a very accurate felling date of the oak timbers of fall/winter 1752–3. The earliest the frame could have been erected was spring/summer of 1753. Seeing as Jonathan Weston was the landowner in 1753 and his name appears at this location on a hand drawn map of Tolland from 1753, it seems most likely he was the builder.

== See also ==
- National Register of Historic Places listings in Tolland County, Connecticut
