= Willington Common Historic District =

Historic district in Connecticut, United States

- U.S. National Register of Historic Places
- U.S. Historic district
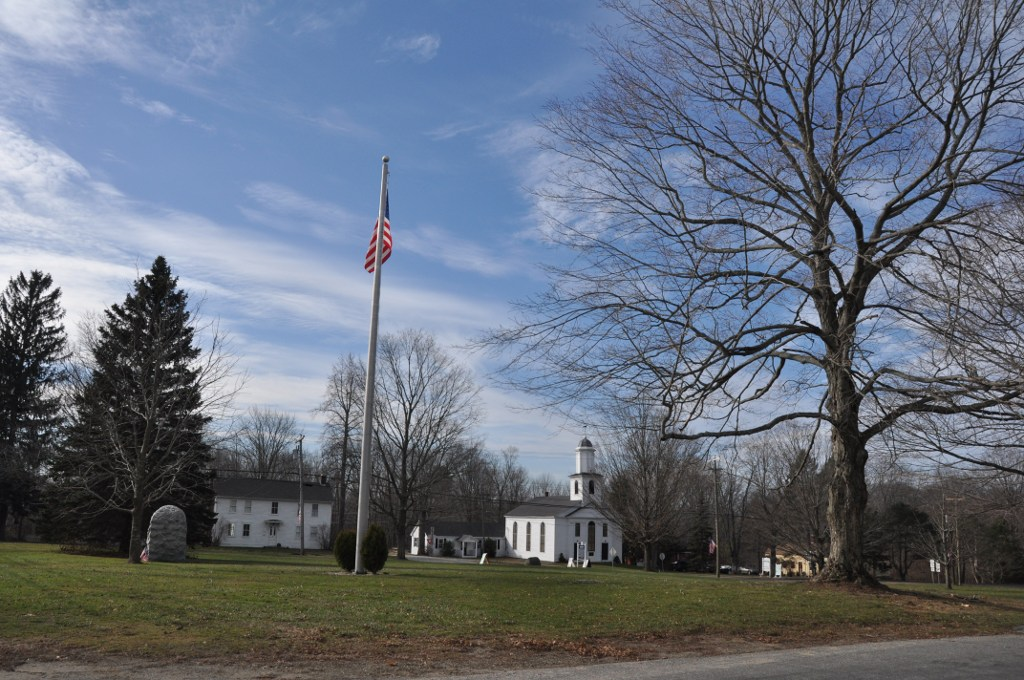
- View roughly Northwest from the Southeast Corner of the Common

- Location within Connecticut Location within the United States
- Location: Properties around Willington Common and East on Tolland Turnpike past Old Farms Road, Willington, Connecticut
- Coordinates: 41°52′31″N 72°15′52″W
- Area: 19 acres (7.7 ha)
- Architect: Sharp, Albert
- Architectural style: Mid 19th Century Revival, Colonial, Federal
- NRHP reference No.: 90001911
- Added to NRHP: December 18, 1990

Willington Common Historic District is a historic district that includes the town green, Willington Common, of the town of Willington, Connecticut. The common and the surrounding buildings were listed on the National Register of Historic Places in 1990.

The district is located at the Junction of Route 74 and Route 320, on the location now known as Willington Hill, which is the original settlement and town center of Willington. The Green is rectangular and is bounded by Route 74 on the south, Jared Sparks Road on the east and Common Road on the north and west.

The buildings around the common were built in the 18th and 19th centuries. They include two churches, the Old Town Hall, a parsonage and other residences (some of which served as stores and taverns). The two churches are the most dominant structures on the Green. The historic district covers an area of 19 acres (7.7 ha) and comprises 32 buildings, sites, and objects. It is noted primarily for its architecture, including designs by Albert Sharp.

== See also ==
- Parker–Hutchinson Farm
- National Register of Historic Places listings in Tolland County, Connecticut
