= Mansfield Center Historic District =

Historic district in Connecticut, United States

- U.S. National Register of Historic Places
- U.S. Historic district
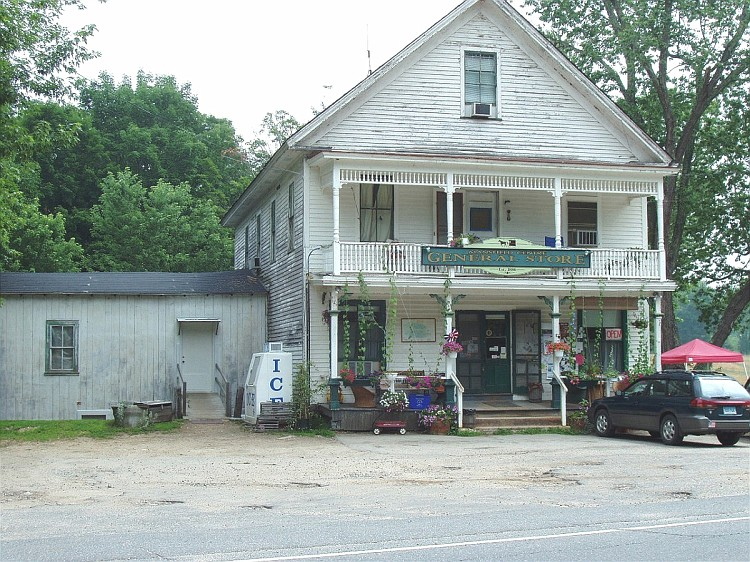
- The Mansfield General Store

- Location within Connecticut Location within the United States
- Location: Storrs Road, Mansfield, Connecticut
- Coordinates: 41°46′37″N 72°11′55″W
- Area: 200 acres (81 ha)
- Built: c. 1694, 1740 and 1836
- Architect: Fitch, Edwin; Multiple
- Architectural style: Colonial; Greek Revival; Federal
- NRHP reference No.: 72001337
- Added to NRHP: February 23, 1972

The Mansfield Center Historic District encompasses the historic early village center of Mansfield, Connecticut. First settled about 1692, it is one of the oldest settlements in Tolland County, and retains a strong sense of 18th century colonial layout. It extends along Storrs Street (Route 195) extending from Chaffeeville Road in the north to Centre Street in the south, and was listed on the National Register of Historic Places in 1972.

== Description and history ==
The area that became the town of Mansfield was first settled about 1692, when Storrs Street was laid out and 21 large house lots were allocated. Two buildings survive from the early period of settlement: the Old Uncle Hall Place, set well on the west side of the street, is a significantly altered house built about 1694, and the Eleazer Williams House, built 1710, is a well-preserved Georgian parsonage house. The village was largely bypassed by industrial development in the town, which resulted in the creation of a number of small mill villages, and to some extent by the establishment of the University of Connecticut at Storrs to the north. The result is a cluster of mainly residential 18th and 19th-century buildings, along with the town hall, library, general store, and church. Also surviving is an early 19th-century animal pound, a rectangular stone enclosure now located on private property.

The district is basically linear, extending along Storrs Street between Chafeeville Road and Centre Street. The most architecturally sophisticated house, and its largest 19th-century residence, is the 1836 Fitch Mansion, a fine example of Greek Revival architecture designed by Colonel Edwin Fitch. The First Church of Christ, (Congregational) United Church of Christ is the third to stand on the site; the current structure was built in 1866 after the second burned. The town library is a single-story Georgian Revival brick building, built in 1923 on a site that formerly housed a district school. The 1886 general store stands at the corner of Storrs and Centre Streets; it is one of a small number of surviving 19th-century general stores in the state.

== See also ==
- National Register of Historic Places listings in Tolland County, Connecticut
