= Parker–Hutchinson Farm =

Historic house in Connecticut, United States

- U.S. National Register of Historic Places
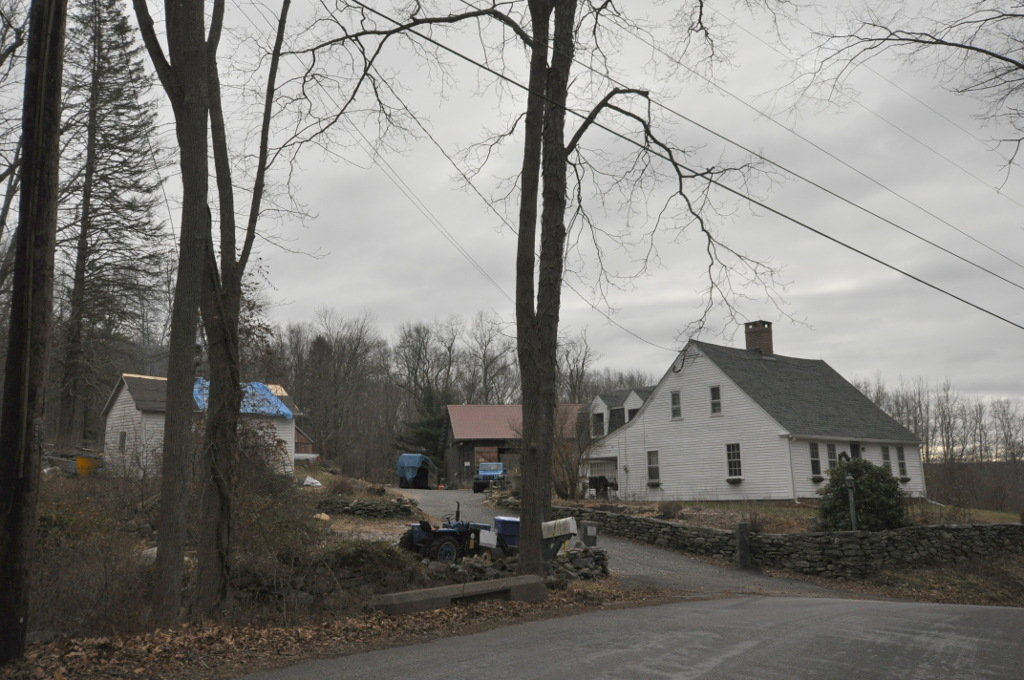

- Location within Connecticut Location within the United States
- Location: Parker Bridge Road, Coventry, Connecticut
- Coordinates: 41°44′27″N 72°19′23″W
- Area: 8 acres (3.2 ha)
- Built: 1850
- Architectural style: "Cape" farmhouse
- NRHP reference No.: 82004386
- Added to NRHP: April 29, 1982

The Parker–Hutchinson Farm is a historic farm property on Parker Bridge Road in Coventry, Connecticut. It includes the Samuel Parker House which dates from 1850. The significance of the property is not for the architecture of its farmhouse, but rather as a remarkably intact site where a number of small-scale industrial enterprises were conducted. The property was listed on the National Register of Historic Places in 1982.

== Description and history ==
The Parker–Hutchinson Farm is located in a rural setting of southern Coventry, on the east side of Parker Bridge Road, east of its crossing of Rufus Brook. The farm is now 8 acres (3.2 ha) in size, with a cluster of buildings set near the road. The complex includes a farmhouse, horse barn, sheep barn, and shed, as well as the foundations of former buildings. The house is a 1 1/2-story Cape style house, with a gabled roof, central chimney, and clapboarded exterior. Its main facade is five bays wide, with a slightly asymmetrical arrangement around a center entrance. A leanto section extends to the rear of the structure. The three outbuildings are, like the house, probably of 19th-century construction; the house's construction methods are also consistent with late 18th century practices.

The farm property provides evidence of early activity leading to two major cottage industries that flourished in 19th-century Coventry: the production and processing of flax, and the raising of sheep and processing of wool. The processing of flax, probably as early as the late 18th century, was documented by a mid-19th century neighbor. Asa Parker Jr. was by 1820 also raising sheep on the property, a practice continued by his daughter and son-in-law, the Hutchinsons. The Hutchinsons are documented to have engaged in a significant number of other small businesses in the 19th century, operating a cider mill and operating a small cooperage and probably also a small woolen hat-making enterprise, in addition to flax and wool processing.

== See also ==
- Willington Common Historic District
- National Register of Historic Places listings in Tolland County, Connecticut
