= Farwell Barn =

Archaeological site in Connecticut, United States

- U.S. National Register of Historic Places
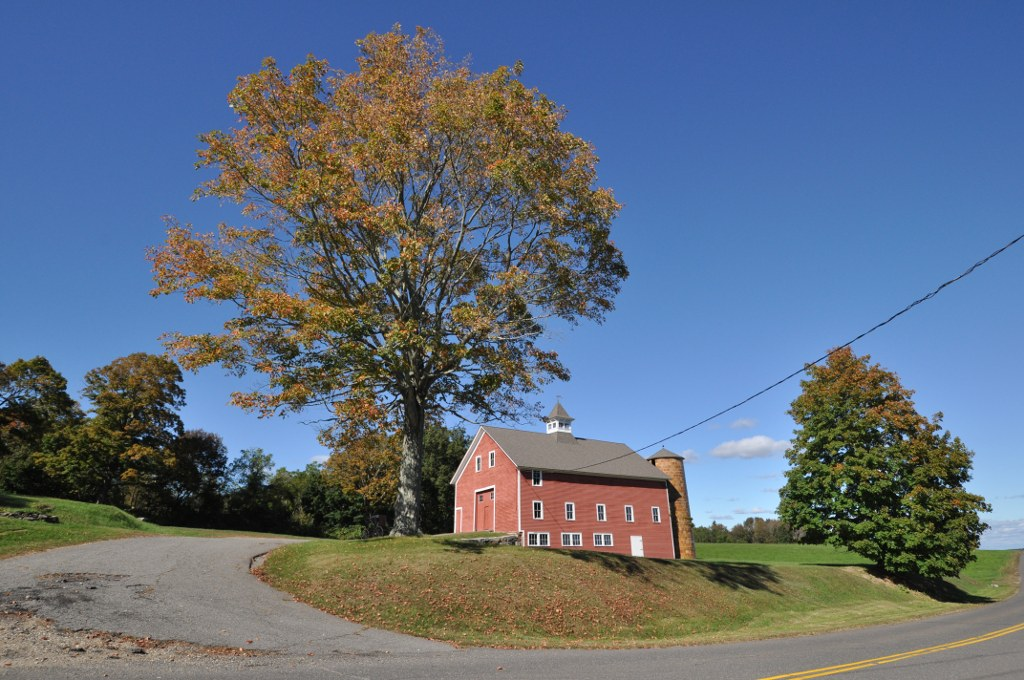

- Location within Connecticut Location within the United States
- Location: Horsebarn Hill Road, Mansfield, Connecticut
- Coordinates: 41°49′5″N 72°15′15″W
- Area: 25 acres (10 ha)
- Built: c. 1870, 1913–1915
- NRHP reference No.: 00001649
- Added to NRHP: January 26, 2001

The Farwell Barn, also known as Jacobson Barn or Jacobson's Barn, is a historic property on Horsebarn Hill Road in Storrs, Connecticut, on the campus of the University of Connecticut. The property is also the site of the archaeological remains of the Farwell House. The barn "is a 19th-century post-and-beam framed clapboarded barn that was built as part of a family farm and then in 1911 was acquired by the Connecticut Agricultural College, the institution that became the University of Connecticut at Storrs." The corresponding house was burned in 1976. The barn was listed on the National Register of Historic Places in 2001.

== Description and history ==
The Jacobson Barn occupies a prominent position at the northern end of the University of Connecticut campus, at the northeast corner of Horsebarn Hill Road and Connecticut Route 195. It measures 62 by 42 feet (19 m × 13 m), and is covered by a gabled roof with the long axis in an east-west orientation and a ventilating cupola at its center. The exterior is finished in wooden clapboards, which appear to be nailed to original vertical board siding. The barn's main entrance is at the western end, with a paved drive leading from Horsebarn Hill Road to a stone ramp and large sliding door. The door is fashioned out of vertically oriented tongue-and-groove boards, and has a normal pedestrian door built into it. The stone ramp is composed of large granite slabs, which also serve as cover for an underground storage space.

The barn was built about 1870, during the ownership of the farm by Isaac Farwell. The Farwell family had been farming in this area since the 18th century, and Isaac was primarily a dairy farmer. After his death, Isaac Jr. and Fidelia Farwell operated the farm, selling it to George Jacobson in 1908. Jacoboson sold the property to the Connecticut Agricultural College in 1911. The school added a sheep barn to the southeast of the structure in 1913–1915. The Farwell house burned down to its foundations in 1976, and today remain as an archaeological site. Archaeologists at the University of Connecticut have excavated this site through the Kids Are Scientists Too (KAST) program and have found various artifacts, including combs and coins.

== See also ==
- National Register of Historic Places listings in Tolland County, Connecticut
