= March Route of Rochambeau's Army: Bailey Road =

- U.S. National Register of Historic Places
- U.S. Historic district
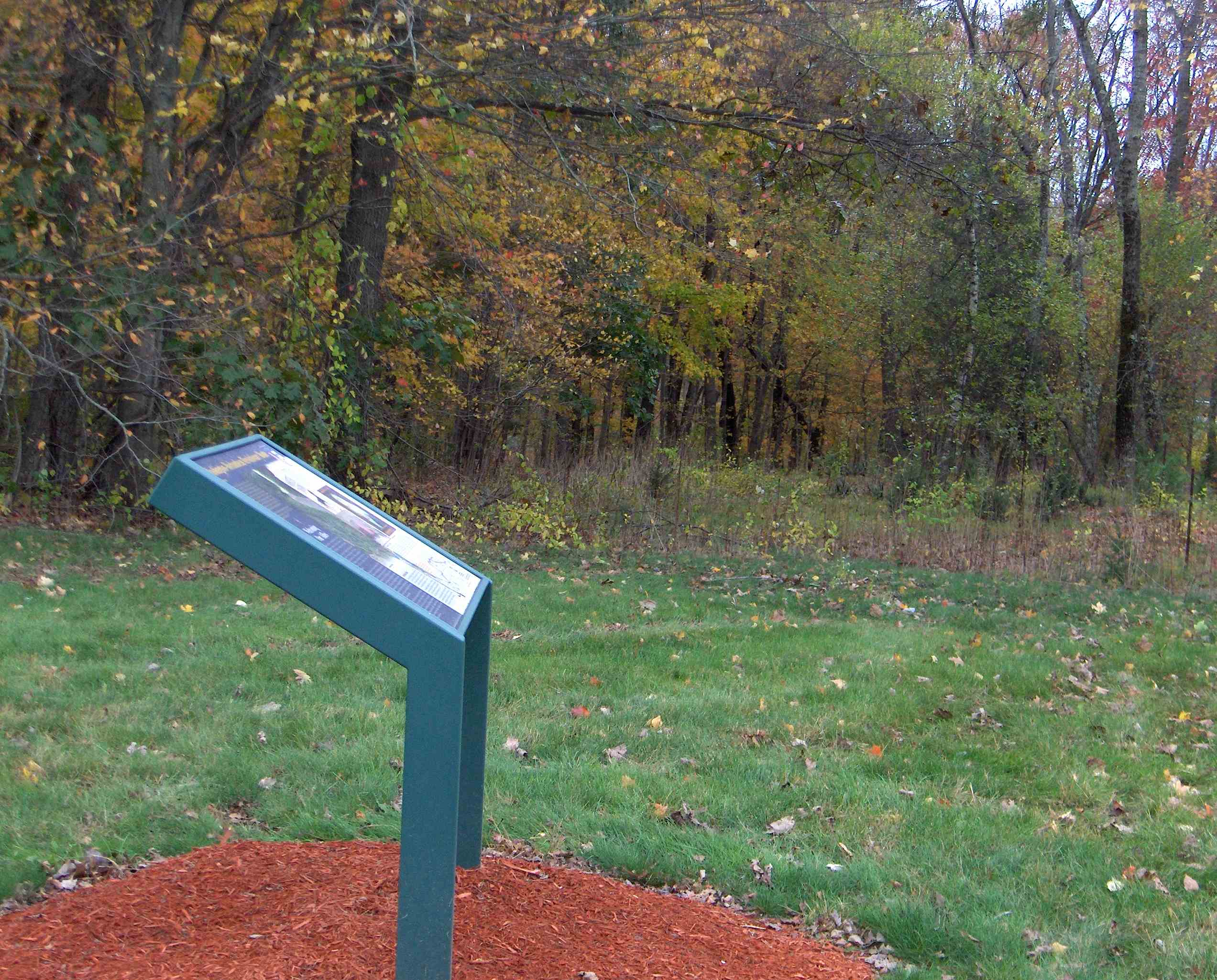

- Location within Connecticut Location within the United States
- Location: Bailey Road, Bolton, Connecticut
- Coordinates: 41°45′44″N 72°24′49″W
- Area: 2 acres (0.81 ha)
- MPS: Rochambeau's Army in Connecticut, 1780-1782 MPS
- NRHP reference No.: 02001677
- Added to NRHP: January 8, 2003

The March Route of Rochambeau's Army: Bailey Road is a section of abandoned roadway that is a historic site in Bolton, Connecticut. It was listed on the National Register of Historic Places in 2003. The roadway is one of the most intact sections in Connecticut of the march route taken by French troops under the command of the Count de Rochambeau in 1781.

== Description and history ==
The Bailey Road portion of the Rochambeau Route is accessed via Bailey Road off United States Route 6 in western Andover. That road comes to a maintained end a short way west of the town line, continuing thereafter as a still-discernible country track about 50 feet (15 m) wide. This now-abandoned stretch of road originally extended all the way to Brandy Street in Bolton, north of the location of Bolton High School. It extends in a generally east-west direction, but winds to follow the terrain, and eventually ascends a steep ridge. Both sides of the road were historically lined with stone walls; that on the south side is now in better condition than that to the north. There are two short stone slab bridges along this road section, which are little more than stone slab box culverts. Unlike many other surviving Rochambeau Route segments, this one is completely devoid of subsequent development.

French chroniclers of the Rochambeau army's trek were highly critical of the road conditions in Connecticut. They described the route between their fourth and fifth camps (Windham and Bolton, respectively) as being "frightful", with "mountains and steep ridges", that one writer said they traversed "with the greatest difficulty imaginable". The road was originally laid out in 1710, and was in the 1790s bypassed by more suitable routes. By the time of World War II, the road segment had been entirely abandoned. Research done in preparation for the march's 200th anniversary identified the road section, in part by the presence of surviving period homes near either end. The eastern end is now marked by an interpretive sign.

== See also ==
- March Route of Rochambeau's army
- List of historic sites preserved along Rochambeau's route
- National Register of Historic Places listings in Tolland County, Connecticut
