= Spring Hill Historic District (Mansfield, Connecticut) =

Historic district in Connecticut, United States

- U.S. National Register of Historic Places
- U.S. Historic district
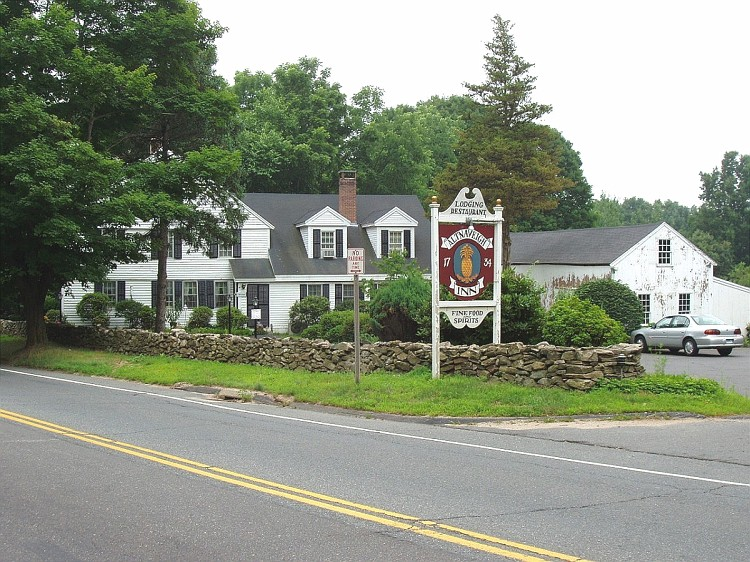
- The Altnaveigh Inn

- Location within Connecticut Location within the United States
- Location: Roughly along Storrs Road, Spring Hill, Mansfield, Connecticut
- Coordinates: 41°47′23″N 72°13′39″W
- Area: approx. 40 acres (16 ha)
- NRHP reference No.: 08000500
- Added to NRHP: October 10, 1979

The Spring Hill Historic District encompasses a rural 19th-century village stretching along Storrs Road (Connecticut Route 195) in Mansfield, Connecticut. Spring Hill developed as a rural waystation on an early 19th-century turnpike, and has seen only modest development since the late 19th century. The district was listed on the National Register of Historic Places in 1979.

== Description and history ==
The village of Spring Hill was little more than a cluster of agricultural farmsteads until the early 19th century, located atop a local hill near the geographic center of Mansfield. It grew as a stopping point on the turnpike running between Norwich, Connecticut and Springfield, Massachusetts (now Storrs Road, Connecticut Route 195), and as an early center for the growing of mulberry trees in pursuit of silk production. Later in the 19th century, Charles and Augustus Storrs, two of its leading residents, gave land to the state for the founding of the University of Connecticut. The principal development since then has been the addition of residences in the 20th century, primarily for people affiliated with the university.

The district extends along Storrs Road roughly between East Road and Spring Hill Road. It is about 40 acres (16 ha) in size, and includes 13 historically significant buildings. Only two survive from the 18th century; most of the rest are 19th century construction, with the Greek Revival as the predominant architectural style. The district includes one church, the Gothic Baptist church built in 1877, as well as two civic buildings that have served as Mansfield's town hall. The Spring Hill area was defined as a Connecticut state historic district in 1972 and, with the same borders, was listed on the National Register of Historic Places in 1979.

== Contributing properties ==
The district includes two of the four houses that had made up Spring Hill as a distinct community around 1800:

- 957 Storrs Road, at listing known as the Altnaveigh Inn, c.1776
- 974 Storrs Road, a cottage, c.1740

One other building was destroyed by fire and the other one was demolished. Its other contributing buildings are mostly with Greek Revival architecture, from that style which rose in popularity in the 1830s. These include:

- Crain House, 928 Storrs Road, from 1838
- Shumway House, 934 Storrs Road, from 1863
- Shubael Freeman Farm, 3 East Road, from 1835
- Bradley Sears Farm, 950 Storrs Road, c.1870, in Italianate, owned by UConn, Storrs
- Town Hall, 954 Storrs Road, from 1935 Colonial Revival, and earlier Town Hall from 1842, Greek Revival (moved back)
- Luther Kingsley House, 958 Storrs Road, from 1740
- Artemus Storrs House, 974 Storrs Road, from 1852, Greek Revival attributed to Edwin Fitch

== See also ==
- National Register of Historic Places listings in Tolland County, Connecticut
