= Jared Cone House =

Historic house in Connecticut, United States

- U.S. National Register of Historic Places
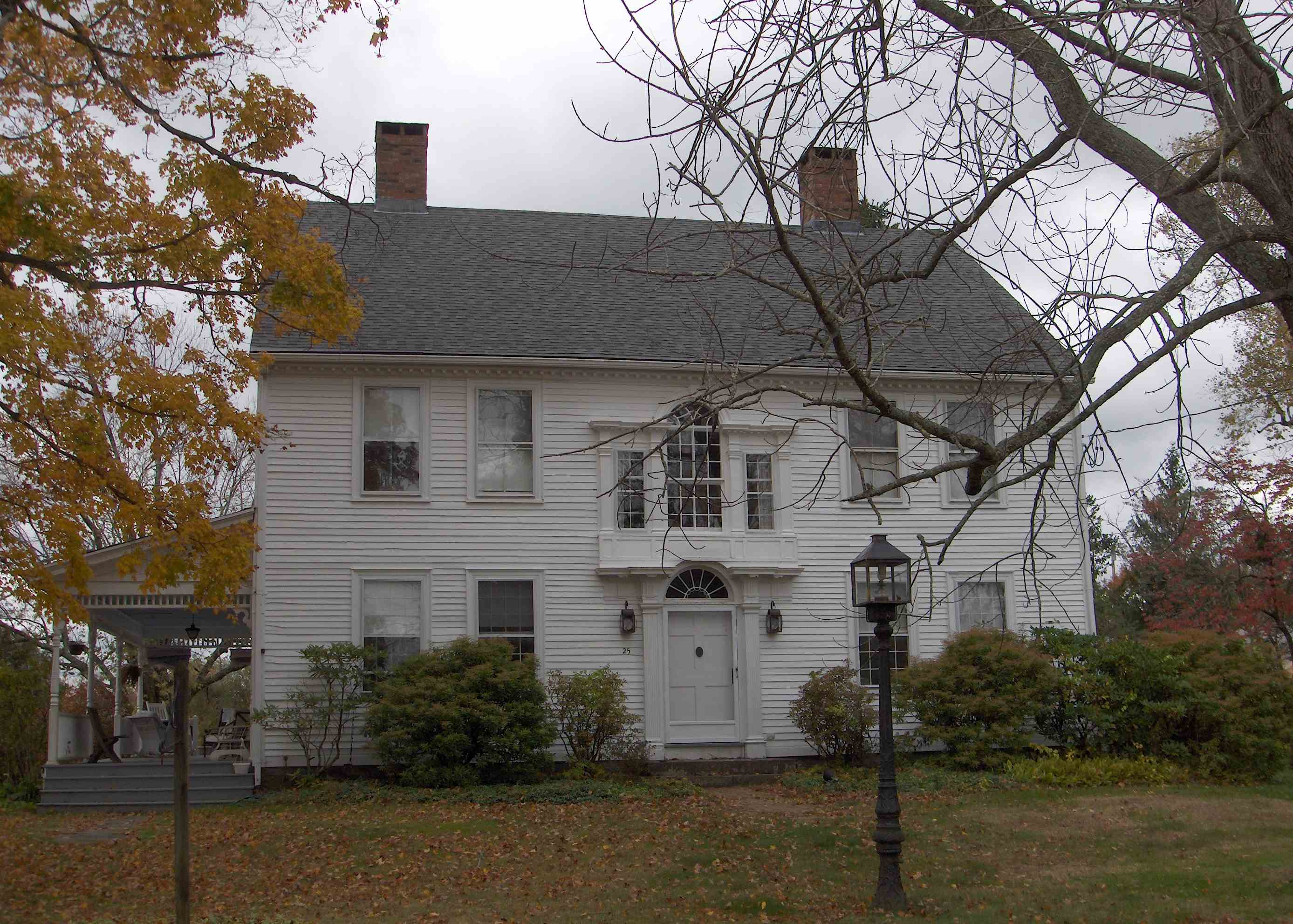

- Location within Connecticut Location within the United States
- Location: 25 Hebron Road, Bolton, Connecticut
- Coordinates: 41°45′58″N 72°26′2″W
- Area: 2.1 acres (0.85 ha)
- Built: c. 1770, 1790-1804
- Architectural style: Federal
- NRHP reference No.: 90000155
- Added to NRHP: February 21, 1990

The Jared Cone House is a historic house at 25 Hebron Road in Bolton, Connecticut. Probably built around the turn of the 19th century but also including an older ell, it is one of the rural community's finest examples of Federal period architecture. It was listed on the National Register of Historic Places in 1990.

== Description and history ==
The Jared Cone House is located a short way south of Bolton center, on the west side of Hebron Road. It is a 2 1/2-story wood-frame structure, five bays wide, with two interior chimneys and an attached single-story kitchen ell. The central bay of the main facade is dominated by a substantial Palladian window on the second level, whose elements are framed by pilasters. The window is above the main entry, which is flanked by pilasters and topped by a semi-circular transom window. The interior follows a fairly typical Georgian central hall plan, and retains original moulding and fireplace surrounds for seven fireplaces, as well as a massive fireplace in the kitchen ell.

The oldest portion of this house is the kitchen ell, which has a construction date of about 1770. The main block of the house is almost certainly a later construction, based on the large amount of Federal style woodwork, as well as the Palladian window, which appears to be integral to its construction and not a later alteration. Jared Cone (1733–1807) served as a Lieutenant, and later a Captain at the Lexington Alarm. Local lore is that Cone bankrupted himself building the house, and sold it in 1804 to Saul Alvord. The house was home to Bolton's post office for a time, with Alvord as the first postmaster, followed by his son Henry. The house's property originally included what is now the adjacent Herrick Park, donated to the town by owners in the 1960s.

== See also ==
- National Register of Historic Places listings in Hartford County, Connecticut
