= RHAM High School =

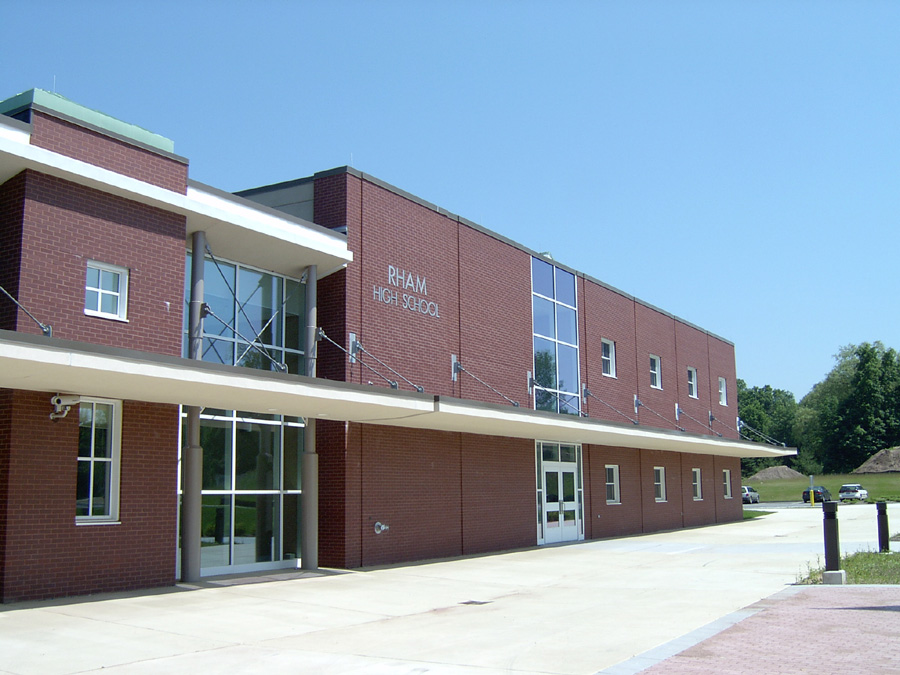

Location
- 85 Wall Street; Hebron, Connecticut 06248; United States; 41°39′51″N 72°21′54″W

Information
- Type: Public school
- Established: September 1956 (70 years ago)
- School district: Regional School District No. 8
- CEEB code: 070323
- Teaching staff: 80.10 (on an FTE basis)
- Grades: 9-12
- Enrollment: 779 (2023-2024)
- Student to teacher ratio: 9.73
- Campus type: Suburban
- Colors: Navy blue, gold, and white
- Athletics conference: Central Connecticut Conference
- Team name: Raptors
- Newspaper: The RHAMbler
- Website: reg8hs.ss19.sharpschool.com

RHAM High School is a public high school located in Hebron, Connecticut, United States. They are a part of Regional School District No. 8. Athletic teams are known as the Raptors, and they competed as a member of the Connecticut Association of Schools in the Central Connecticut Conference.

== History ==
Opened in 1956, RHAM High School serves students grades 9-12. The school serves Hebron, Andover, and Malborough. In 1957, Andover joined the other two towns to help build the regional high school. Prior to the construction of RHAM, students in Andover attended Windham High School.

Their name stands for the 3 towns it serves as well as identifying itself as a regional high school (Regional Hebron Andover Marlborough High School).

== Athletics ==
=== CAS State Championships ===
- Baseball - 2004
- Boys golf - 2022
- Girls cross country - 1993, 1994, 1996, 1997, 2007, 2016.
- Girls volleyball - 2007, 2008, 2009, 2010, 2013, 2016, 2017, 2021, 2022.

== Notable alumni ==
- Gretchen Mol, American actress
- A.J. Pollock, former professional baseball player in the Major League Baseball (MLB)
- Tony Grano, former professional boxer
