= March Route of Rochambeau's Army: Hutchinson Road =

- U.S. National Register of Historic Places
- U.S. Historic district
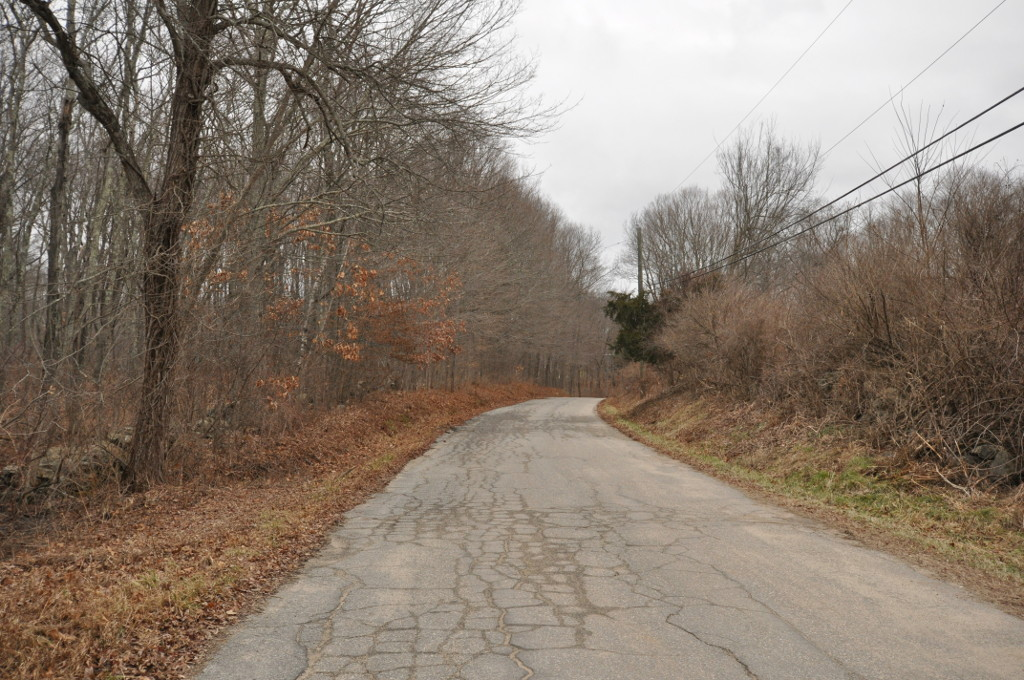
- Hutchinson Road in 2016

- Location within Connecticut Location within the United States
- Location: Hutchinson Road, from Junction with Hendee Road Southward to end, Andover, Connecticut
- Coordinates: 41°45′26.2″N 72°23′58.9″W
- Area: 2 acres (0.81 ha)
- MPS: Rochambeau's Army in Connecticut, 1780-1782 MPS
- NRHP reference No.: 02000425
- Added to NRHP: May 6, 2002

The March Route of Rochambeau's Army: Hutchinson Road is a 2-acre (0.81 ha) historic road section in Andover, Connecticut. The section of Hutchinson Road, laid out in the early 18th century and formerly an alignment of United States Route 6, formed part of the 1781-82 march routes of Rochambeau's army which contributed to American victory in the American Revolutionary War. It was listed on the National Register of Historic Places in 2002.

== Description and history ==
Hutchinson Road is located in western Andover, paralleling the modern alignment of US 6, which runs roughly northwest to southeast a short way to the west. A former alignment of US 6, it is accessed from Hendee Road, extending both north and south to dead ends shortly before reaching US 6. The historic section of the roadway consists of the portion south of Hendee Road. It is an asphalt-paved roadway, with a right of way 22 feet (6.7 m) wide, lined for most of its distance by stone walls. The road section is about 3,000 feet (910 m) long, and is lined with electric utility poles. The segment includes just one building: White's Tavern, which is also historically associated with the Rochambeau march. The road section is one of multiple properties along the march route evaluated in a 2001 study.

The road section is part of a road laid out in the early 18th century, connecting the capital at Hartford with the important communities of Lebanon and Norwich in the southeastern part of the state. This road is identified on maps prepared by French engineers who determined the Rochambeau army's march route in 1781. White's Tavern is known to have quartered French officers during both the southward march in 1781 and the northward march in 1782. The army encamped in the area north of Hendee Road on the 1782 march. The road remained a major regional through route, with improvements made in both the 19th and 20th centuries, until the new alignment of US 6 bypassed it. The area's landscape continues to retain an appearance reminiscent of the 1780s.

== See also ==
- March Route of Rochambeau's Army: Bailey Road, an even better-preserved march section a short way northwest of this one
- March Route of Rochambeau's army
- List of historic sites preserved along Rochambeau's route
