= Edwin Fitch =

American architect

Edwin Fitch was an architect and builder in Connecticut.

He designed and/or built:

- one or more buildings or structures in Gurleyville Historic District, N of Mansfield Center off CT 195 at jct. of Gurleyville and Chaffeeville Rds., Mansfield Center, Connecticut, (Fitch, Edwin);
- one or more buildings or structures in Mansfield Center Historic District, Storrs Rd., Mansfield, Connecticut (Fitch, Edwin); and
- one or more buildings or structures in Mansfield Hollow Historic District, 86-127 Mansfield Hollow Rd., Mansfield, Connecticut (Fitch, Edwin).

He is attributed as designer and/or builder of one building in Spring Hill Historic District (Mansfield, Connecticut).
