= Hebron Center Historic District =

Historic district in Connecticut, United States

- U.S. National Register of Historic Places
- U.S. Historic district
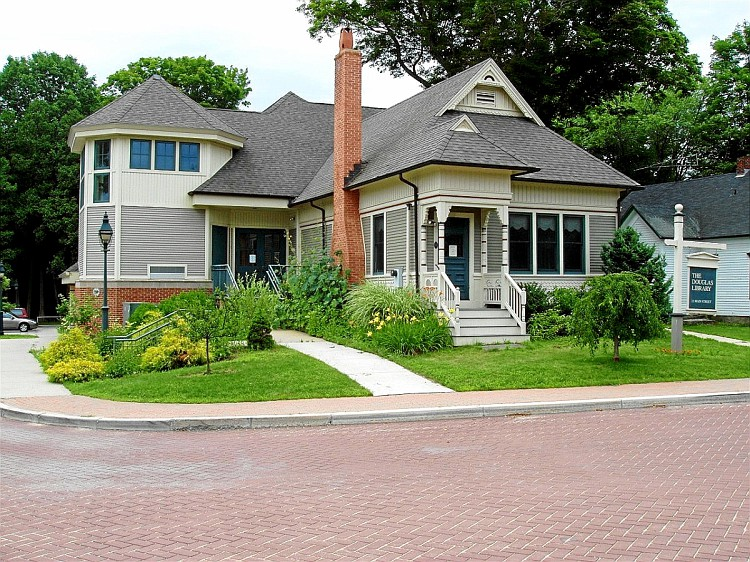
- Douglas Library

- Location within Connecticut Location within the United States
- Location: Church, Gilead, Main, Wall and West Streets, and Marjorie Circle, Hebron, Connecticut
- Coordinates: 41°39′26″N 72°22′8″W
- Area: 83 acres (34 ha)
- Architect: Multiple
- Architectural style: Federal; Greek Revival
- NRHP reference No.: 93000649
- Added to NRHP: July 30, 1993

Hebron Center Historic District encompasses most of the historic village center of Hebron, Connecticut. Centered on the junction of Connecticut Routes 66 and 85, it has served as the rural community's civic center since its incorporation in 1708. The district was listed on the National Register of Historic Places in 1993.

== Description and history ==
The town of Hebron was incorporated in 1708, and has historically been agricultural for much of its history. Its town green, also the site of a colonial meeting house, was the only civic focal point of consequence in its early years, later augmented by a tavern, shop, and gristmill. The town green now survives only in fragmented portions on either side of Main Street (Route 66), owing to 20th-century highway widening and alignment. A series of fires in the 19th century wiped out virtually all of the village's 18th-century buildings, and only a handful of early 19th-century houses survive.

The historic district is centered at the junction of Routes 66 and 85, the former an early main road. It extends for a short distances in most directions, and a slightly longer distance eastward along Route 66, and includes a few houses on two side streets, Marjorie Circle and Wall Street. The district included 60 contributing buildings, the Hebron Green (Veterans Memorial Park), the remains of the site of the Hebron Town Pound, and the cemetery of St. Peter's Episcopal Church. Also included are 19 non-contributing buildings and six war memorials (non-contributing objects) on the surviving elements of the Hebron Green. In addition to many 19th-century houses, several churches and the town public library (Douglas Library) are also included in the district.

== See also ==
- National Register of Historic Places listings in Tolland County, Connecticut
