= White's Tavern =

- U.S. National Register of Historic Places
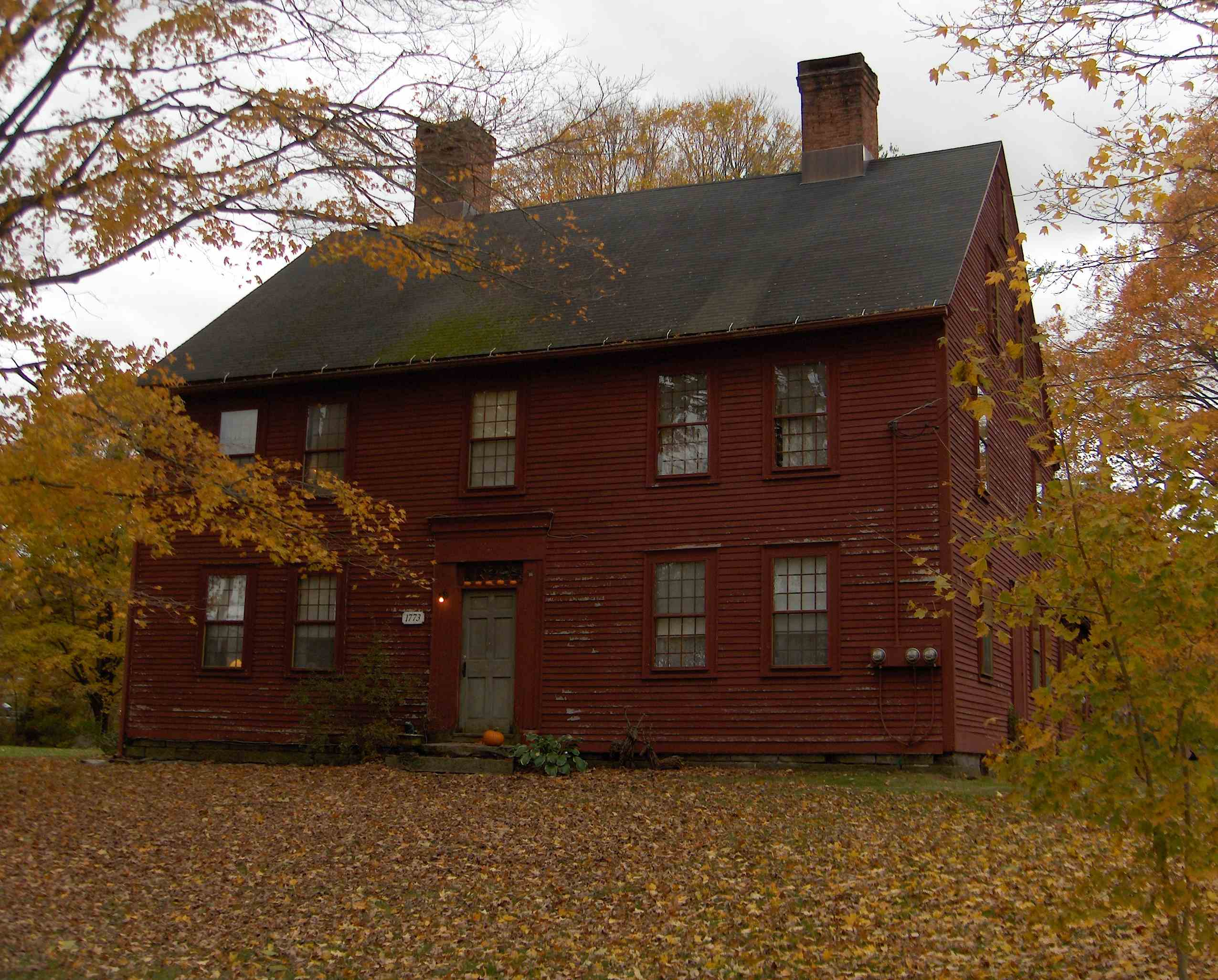

- Location within Connecticut Location within the United States
- Location: 131 Route 6, Andover, Connecticut
- Coordinates: 41°45′12″N 72°23′51″W
- Area: 3 acres (1.2 ha)
- Built: 1773
- Architectural style: Colonial
- NRHP reference No.: 91000947
- Added to NRHP: July 26, 1991

White's Tavern (also known as the Daniel White Tavern) is a historic former tavern on Route 6 in Andover, Connecticut, built in 1773. It was a well-preserved example of colonial architecture, notable for hosting French Army officers in the American Revolutionary War. As of late 2026 it is being converted from a private residence to a meditation center, with portions subject to dramatic renovation. It was listed on the National Register of Historic Places in 1991.

== Description and history ==
The former White's Tavern is located on the east side of US Route 6, south of its junction with Hendee Road. The building is set between US 6 and Hutchinson Road, an 18th-century alignment of a main road through the area. It is a large 2 1/2-story wood-framed structure, five bays wide with two interior chimneys. The windows are evenly spaced within a narrower area than the full width of the building, rather than being uniformly spaced across the main façade. The main entrance is framed by simple molding and topped by a transom window. The building has a central hall plan, with original wide floor boards, plasterwork, and fireplaces. Some of the upstairs rooms have swinging walls mounted on strap hinges that can be moved to create a large ballroom.

The tavern was built in 1773 by Daniel White, and was in use as a tavern when the French Army marched through the area in 1781, camping just to its north. The Marquis de Chastellux was among the French officers who stayed here. Until late 2026, the building was architecturally significant as a well-preserved 18th century tavern house.

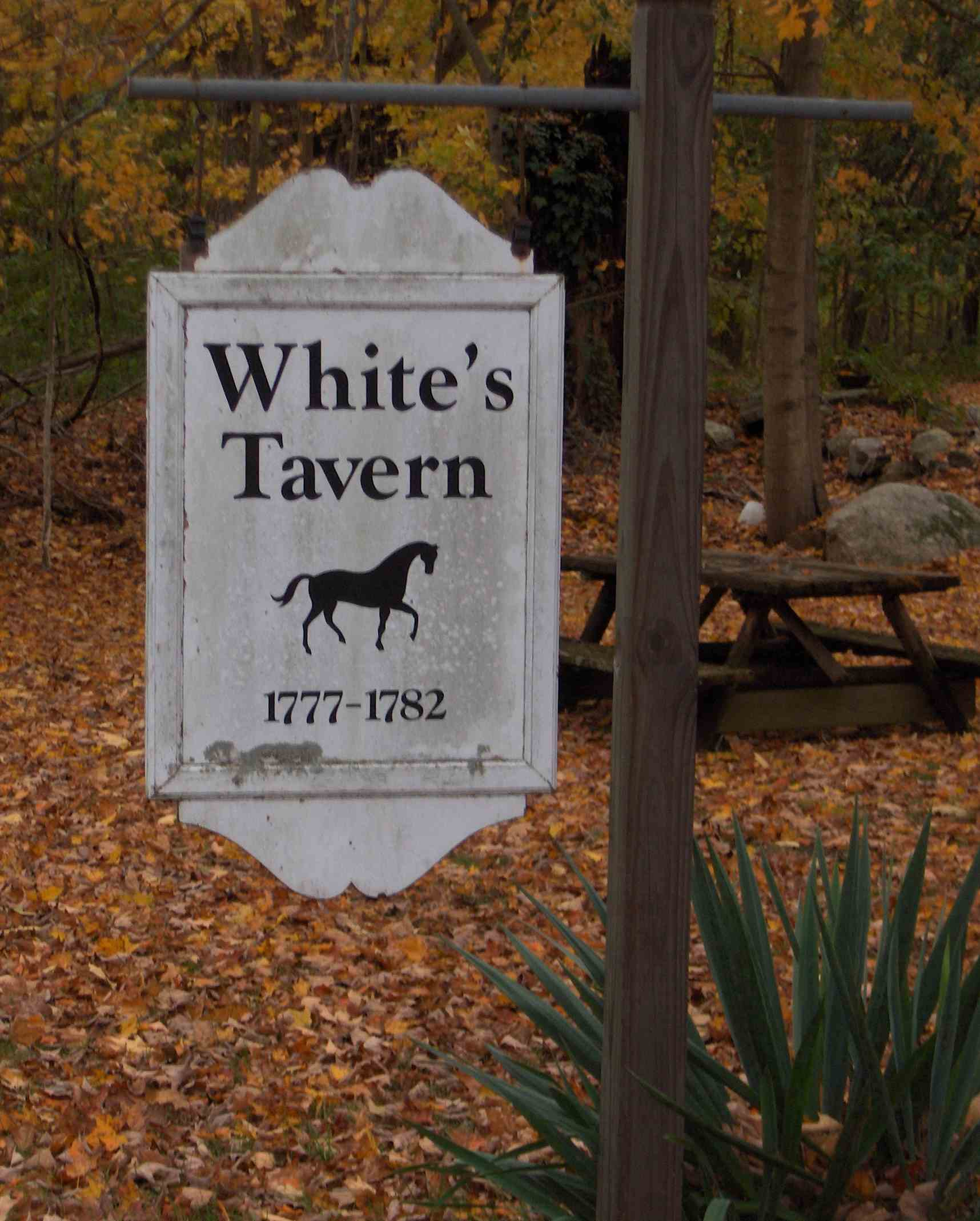

== See also ==
- National Register of Historic Places listings in Tolland County, Connecticut
- List of historic sites preserved along Rochambeau's route
