= Andover, Connecticut =

- Town
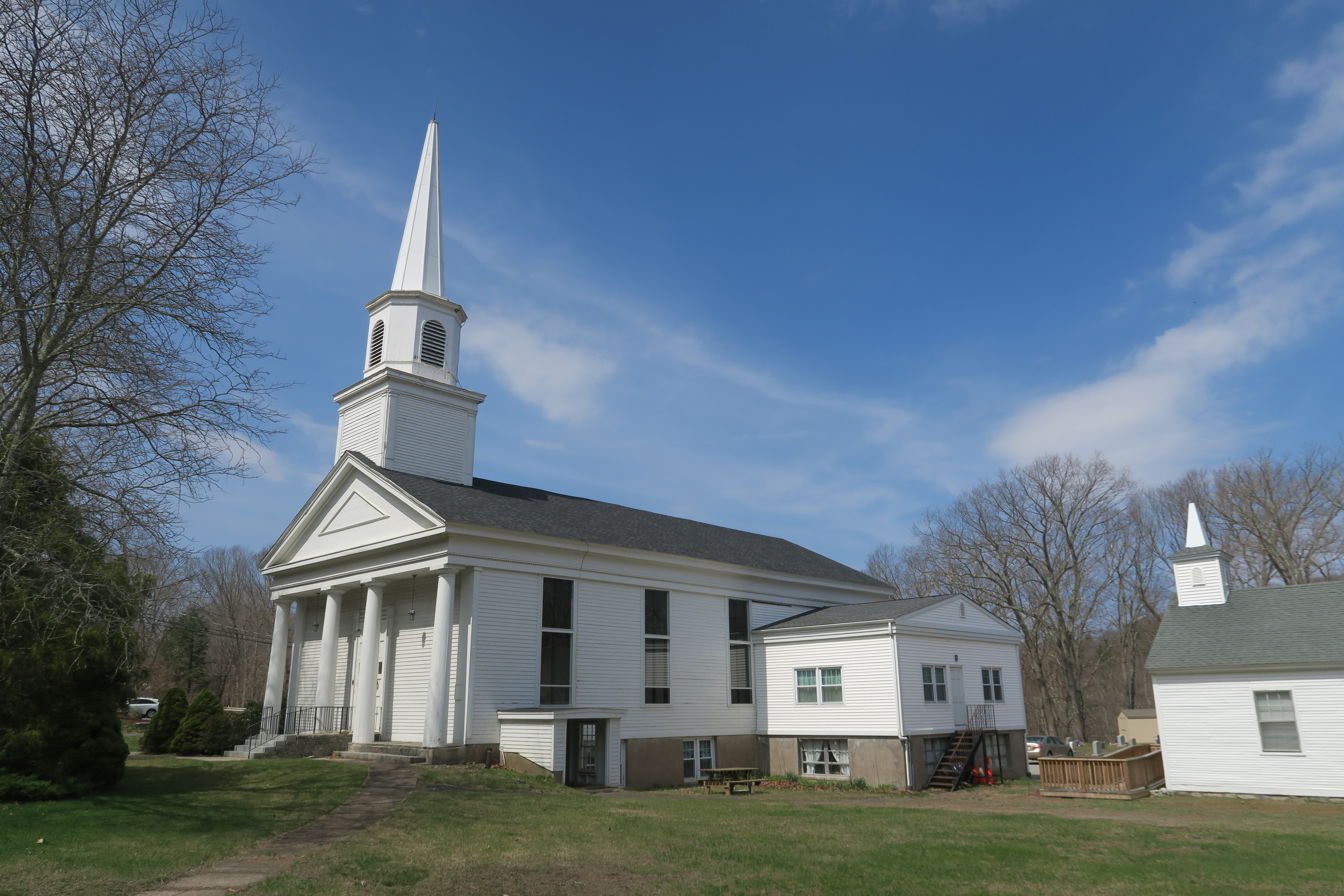
- First Congregational Church (2017)

- Seal

- Interactive map of Andover, Connecticut
- Coordinates: 41°43′58″N 72°22′29″W
- Country: United States
- U.S. state: Connecticut
- County: Tolland
- Region: Capitol Region
- Incorporated: May 18, 1848

Government
  - Type: Selectman-town meeting
  - First Selectman: Jonathan P. Zabel (D)

Area
  - Total: 15.7 sq mi (40.7 km^{2})
  - Land: 15.4 sq mi (40.0 km^{2})
  - Water: 0.23 sq mi (0.6 km^{2})
- Elevation: 400 ft (122 m)

Population (2020)
  - Total: 3,151
- Time zone: UTC−5 (Eastern)
  - Summer (DST): UTC−4 (Eastern)
- ZIP Code: 06232
- Area codes: 860/959
- FIPS code: 09-01080
- GNIS ID: 213382
- Website: andoverconnecticut.org

Andover is a rural town in Tolland County, Connecticut, United States, roughly 10 miles east of Hartford. The population was 3,151 at the 2020 census.

== History ==
Andover was incorporated on May 18, 1848, from Hebron and Coventry. The name is a transfer from Andover, Hampshire, England.

== Geography ==
According to the United States Census Bureau, the town has a total area of 15.7 square miles (41 km^{2}), of which 15.5 square miles (40 km^{2}) is land and 0.2 square miles (0.52 km^{2}) (1.53%) is water. Several small streams and rivers flow in Andover, among which are the Hop River, Burnap Brook, Skungamaug River, and Straddle Brook. Andover Lake is located in the southeastern corner of town.

The town borders Coventry to the Northeast, Columbia to the Southeast, Hebron to the Southwest, and Bolton to the Northwest.

== Demographics ==
Historical population
Census	Pop.	Note	%±
1850	500		—
1860	517		3.4%
1870	461		−10.8%
1880	428		−7.2%
1890	401		−6.3%
1900	385		−4.0%
1910	371		−3.6%
1920	389		4.9%
1930	430		10.5%
1940	560		30.2%
1950	1,034		84.6%
1960	1,771		71.3%
1970	2,099		18.5%
1980	2,144		2.1%
1990	2,540		18.5%
2000	3,036		19.5%
2010	3,303		8.8%
2020	3,151		−4.6%
U.S. Decennial Census

As of the 2020 United States census, Andover had a population of 3,151.

The racial composition of the population was 89.7% white, 1.4% black or African American, 0.1% Native American, 1.1% Asian, 1.0% from some other race, and 6.7% reporting two or more races. 3.8% of the population was Hispanic or Latino of any race.

As of 2021, 5.7% of the population was born outside the United States. Of the foreign-born population, 5.6% were not US citizens.

As of the 2020 census, the town had 1,271 households, occupying 96% of available housing units. 2.4% of units were for seasonal, recreational, or occasional use. The population density was 200.7 inhabitants per square mile (77.5/km^{2}). There were 1,342 housing units at an average density of 85.5 per square mile (33.0/km^{2}). 99.8% of the town's population lived in households, with the remaining 0.2% living in noninstitutionalized group quarters.

99.8% of the town's population lived in households, with the remaining 0.2% living in noninstitutionalized group quarters.

Of the 1,271 households, 58.4% were married couples living together; 17.9% with their own children under 18. 7.5% were cohabitating couples; 1.5% with their own children under 18. 15.7% were male householders with no spouse or partner present; 10.9% living alone, and 2.0% with their own children under 18. 18.4% had a female householder with no spouse or partner present; 10.4% living alone, and 2.4% with their own children under 18.

Population pyramid 2020
%	Males	Age	Females	%
1.0		85+		1.8
1.6		80–84		1.8
3.0		75–79		3.0
4.8		70–74		4.7
7.5		65–69		8.4
10.7		60–64		10.3
8.9		55–59		10.2
8.2		50–54		9.4
6.7		45–49		6.1
4.6		40–44		4.3
4.5		35–39		5.1
6.0		30–34		5.6
5.2		25–29		5.0
6.5		20–24		5.3
7.7		15–19		5.2
5.0		10–14		5.8
3.5		5–9		3.7
4.7		0–4		4.4

The median age was 48.9 years. 50.5% of the population was male and 49.5% female.

97.2% of the population over 25 had a high school diploma or higher. 41.5% had a bachelor's degree or higher, and 19.6% had a graduate or professional degree.

As of 2021, the median household income was $102,759, and the median family income was $116,354. Males had a median income of $73,693 versus $57,212 for females. The per capita income for the town was $48,419. 1.6% of the population had an income in the past year that was below the poverty line, all between the ages of 18 and 64.

Of the 1,582 workers 16 years or older, 84.6% drove alone to work. 5.8% carpooled, 0.6% used public transportation, 0.4% walked, and 8.5% worked from home. The mean travel time to work was 26 minutes.

(England) English	25.6%
(Italy) Italian	19.8%
(Republic of Ireland) Irish	19.2%
(Germany) German	8.6%
(Sweden) Swedish	8.0%
(Quebec) French Canadian	6.4%
(Poland) Polish	5.2%
(France) French	3.7%
(United States) American	3.3%
(Lithuania) Lithuanian	2.6%
(Russia) Russian	1.8%
(Ukraine) Ukrainian	1.4%
(Scotland) Scottish	1.2%
Other	4.2%
Reported Ethnic Backgrounds, 2021 ACS 5-Year Estimates

== Infrastructure ==
The Andover Public Library was originally opened in 1896, in the Congregational Church Conference House. It was relocated in 1927 to its present location on Long Hill Road.

=== Transportation ===
The 918 Willimantic-Coventry Express, operated by CT Transit, is a bus route that offers weekday service to Willimantic, Columbia, Coventry, Bolton, and Hartford.

US 6 runs roughly northwest–southeast through the center of town, connecting Andover to Willimantic and Providence, Rhode Island, to the East and Bolton and Hartford to the West.

Route 316 begins in the center of Andover at a junction with Route 6. It runs south, connecting to the neighboring town of Hebron.

Route 87 begins on the Eastern side of Andover at a junction with Route 6. It continues to the Southeast, connecting to neighboring Columbia and eventually terminating just outside of Norwich.

== Points of interest ==
- Andover Veterans Monument Park is located on Monument Lane in front of the Museum of Andover History. The Agent Orange Monument in memory of those who died because of Agent Orange during the Vietnam War was unveiled on June 5, 2021, at the Andover Veterans Monument Park.
- Museum of Andover History is located in the Old Town Hall on Monument Lane. It traces the history of Andover since 1600.
- The Hop River State Park Trail is a rail trail that passes through Andover with multiple connections to local roads
- The March Route of Rochambeau's Army passes through Andover along Route 6 and the historic Hutchinson Road
- Andover Center Historic District is on the National Register of Historic Places
- White's Tavern, also on the NRHP, is notable for hosting Rochambeau and other French officers during the American Revolution
- Nathan Hale State Forest is partially located in and accessible from Andover

== Education ==
Andover is home to Andover Elementary School for grades K–6, while grades 7–12 go to R.H.A.M. Middle and high schools.

== Politics ==
Voter Registration and Party Enrollment as of October 31, 2024
Party	Active Voters	Inactive Voters	Total Voters	Percentage
Republican	710	17	727	29.3%
Democratic	676	31	707	28.5%
Minor Parties	36	4	40	1.6%
Unaffiliated	971	33	1,004	40.5%
Total	2,393	85	2,478	100%

Presidential Election Results
Year	Democratic	Republican	Third Parties
2024	49.3% 1,032	49.4% 1,035	1.3% 27
2020	50.6% 1,058	47.7% 998	1.7% 35
2016	47.0% 896	46.7% 891	6.3% 121
2012	55.1% 976	43.7% 774	1.2% 22
2008	58.4% 1,090	39.9% 745	1.7% 31
2004	54.4% 980	44.1% 796	1.5% 28
2000	54.9% 871	38.2% 609	6.9% 111
1996	48.5% 711	32.7% 480	18.8% 275
1992	40.0% 634	30.2% 480	29.8% 472
1988	47.5% 604	50.9% 649	1.6% 21
1984	36.5% 435	63.5% 758	0.00% 0
1980	32.5% 374	47.9% 552	19.6% 226
1976	47.8% 487	51.6% 526	0.6% 6
1972	41.3% 446	57.7% 624	1.0% 11
1968	44.0% 419	49.1% 469	6.9% 66
1964	52.3% 556	47.7% 508	0.00% 0
1960	46.6% 391	56.4% 505	0.00% 0
1956	32.7% 240	67.3% 494	0.00% 0

Local government in Andover is organized by a board of selectmen, consisting of 5 members. Per the town charter, no political party can have more than three members on the board at one time. As of 2025, the first selectman was Jeffrey J. Maguire (D) and the vice first selectman was Jeffrey A. Murray (R). The board also included Scott R. Person (D), Anne Peterson Cremè (D), and one vacant seat. The next election is scheduled for 2027.

The approved town budget for the fiscal year 2024-25 was $12,836,706.61.

Andover is a part of District 55 for the Connecticut House of Representatives. It has been represented by Republican Steve Weir since 2023. In the Connecticut State Senate, Andover is a part of District 4, represented by Democrat MD Rahman since 2023. At the federal level, Andover is located in Connecticut's 2nd Congressional District, which has been represented by Democrat Joe Courtney since 2007.

== Notable people ==
- Daniel Burnap (1759-1838) - Clock-maker - Born in Andover
- William Buell Sprague (1795-1876) - Congregational and Presbyterian clergyman and biographer - Born in Andover
- Abby B. Hyde (1799-1872) - Hymn-writer - Died in Andover
- Milton Badger (1800-1873) - Congregational Minister - Born in Andover
- Theodore A. Bingham (1858-1934) - New York City Police Commissioner 1906-09 - Born in Andover
