= Hebron, Connecticut =

Town in Connecticut, United States

- Town
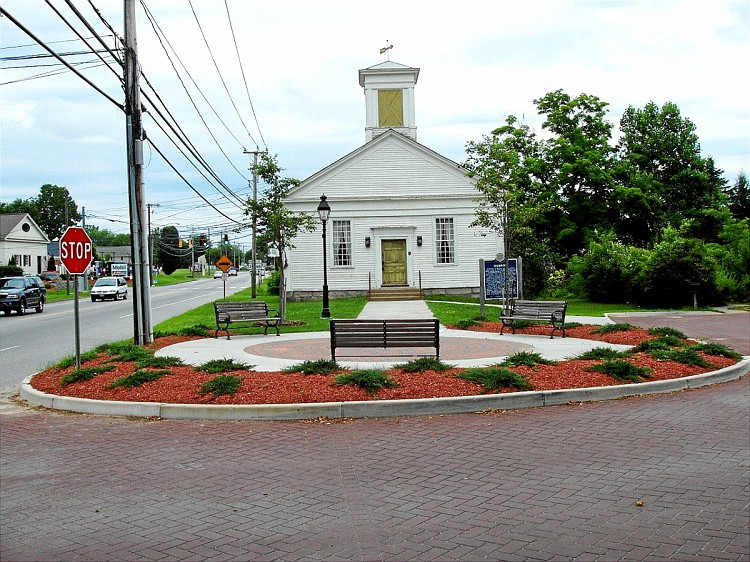
- Old Town Hall

- Seal
- Motto: "Historic Charm...with a Vision for the Future"
- Interactive map of Hebron, Connecticut
- Coordinates: 41°39′N 72°23′W
- Country: United States
- U.S. state: Connecticut
- County: Tolland
- Region: Capitol Region
- Incorporated: 1708

Government
  - Type: Council-manager
  - Town Manager: Donna Lanza (interim)
  - Town Council: Tiffany Thiele (Chair); Jan Lawrence (Vice Chair); Sean Fitzgerald; Keith Petit; Claudia Riley

Area
  - Total: 37.3 sq mi (96.6 km^{2})
  - Land: 36.9 sq mi (95.6 km^{2})
  - Water: 0.35 sq mi (0.9 km^{2})
- Elevation: 505 ft (154 m)

Population (2020)
  - Total: 9,098
  - Density: 250/sq mi (96/km^{2})
- Time zone: UTC-5 (Eastern)
  - Summer (DST): UTC-4 (Eastern)
- ZIP Codes: 06231, 06248
- Area codes: 860/959
- FIPS code: 09-37910
- GNIS feature ID: 0213445
- Website: www.hebronct.com

Hebron (/ˈhibrɪn/ HEE-brin) is a town in Tolland County, Connecticut, United States. The town is part of the Capitol Planning Region. The population was 9,098 at the 2020 census. Hebron was incorporated May 26, 1708. In 2010, Hebron was rated #6 in Top Towns in Connecticut with population between 6,500 and 10,000, according to Connecticut Magazine.

The villages of Hebron Center, Gilead and Amston, are located within Hebron. Amston has its own ZIP Code and post office. The remnants of two long since abandoned communities, Grayville and Gay City, are also located in Hebron. The site of the latter is now Gay City State Park.

== History ==
The town of Hebron was settled in 1704, and incorporated on May 26, 1708, within Hartford County from Non-County Area 1 of the Connecticut Colony. The diamond shape of the town seal has its origins in the diamond figure brand, $\stackrel{\bigwedge}{\vee}$, required on all horses kept in Hebron by a May 1710 act of the Colonial Assembly.

Hebron became a town in Windham County upon its formation on May 12, 1726. It became a town in Tolland County upon its formation from part of Windham County on October 13, 1785. On October 13, 1803, the town of Marlborough, Hartford County was created from parts of the towns of Colchester (New London County), Glastonbury (Hartford County), and Hebron.

== Geography ==
According to the United States Census Bureau, the town has a total area of 37.3 square miles (97 km^{2}), of which 36.9 square miles (96 km^{2}) is land and 0.4 square miles (1.0 km^{2}) (0.97%) is water.

== Demographics ==
Historical population
| Census | Pop. | Note | %± |
|---|---|---|---|
| 1820 | 2,094 | | — |
| 1850 | 1,345 | | — |
| 1860 | 1,425 | | 5.9% |
| 1870 | 1,279 | | −10.2% |
| 1880 | 1,243 | | −2.8% |
| 1890 | 1,039 | | −16.4% |
| 1900 | 1,016 | | −2.2% |
| 1910 | 894 | | −12.0% |
| 1920 | 915 | | 2.3% |
| 1930 | 879 | | −3.9% |
| 1940 | 999 | | 13.7% |
| 1950 | 1,320 | | 32.1% |
| 1960 | 1,819 | | 37.8% |
| 1970 | 3,815 | | 109.7% |
| 1980 | 5,453 | | 42.9% |
| 1990 | 7,079 | | 29.8% |
| 2000 | 8,610 | | 21.6% |
| 2010 | 9,686 | | 12.5% |
| 2020 | 9,098 | | −6.1% |
U.S. Decennial Census

As of the census of 2000, there were 8,610 people, 2,993 households, and 2,466 families residing in the town. The population density was 233.3 inhabitants per square mile (90.1/km^{2}). There were 3,110 housing units at an average density of 84.3 per square mile (32.5/km^{2}). The racial makeup of the town was 97.69% White, 0.58% African American, 0.13% Native American, 0.56% Asian, 0.03% Pacific Islander, 0.20% from other races, and 0.81% from two or more races. Hispanic or Latino of any race were 1.07% of the population.

There were 2,993 households, out of which 45.1% had children under the age of 18 living with them, 74.4% were married couples living together, 5.9% had a female householder with no husband present, and 17.6% were non-families. 13.4% of all households were made up of individuals, and 4.2% had someone living alone who was 65 years of age or older. The average household size was 2.88 and the average family size was 3.19.

In the town, the population was spread out, with 30.0% under the age of 18, 4.6% from 18 to 24, 33.7% from 25 to 44, 25.7% from 45 to 64, and 6.0% who were 65 years of age or older. The median age was 37 years. For every 100 females, there were 100.1 males. For every 100 females age 18 and over, there were 97.2 males.

The median income for a household in the town was $115,980. Males had a median income of $62,109 versus $52,237 for females. The per capita income for the town was $39,775. About 0.3% of families and 1.0% of the population were below the poverty line, including 0.2% of those under age 18 and 3.2% of those age 65 or over.

Voter Registration and Party Enrollment as of October 29, 2019
| Party | Active Voters | Inactive Voters | Total Voters | Percentage |
|---|---|---|---|---|
| Democratic | 1,999 | 68 | 2,067 | 28.03% |
| Republican | 1,828 | 54 | 1,882 | 25.52% |
| Unaffiliated | 3,253 | 96 | 3,349 | 45.42% |
| Minor Parties | 73 | 3 | 76 | 1.03% |
| Total | 7,153 | 221 | 7374 | 100% |

== Arts and culture ==
=== Annual cultural events ===
A major commercial attraction is the annual Hebron Harvest Fair, which features bingo, fried foods, rides, prizes, arts & crafts, pig races, tractor pulls, prizes for the best pies and the biggest pumpkins. The event occurs every September. This event is not only for the people of Hebron, but also for many tourists visiting the town.

== Parks and recreation ==
Hebron's most popular year-round recreation area is Gay City State Park, Connecticut's fourth-largest state park. There is a 5-mile perimeter trail and an extensive network of cross trails that run throughout the park. All are suitable for woodland hiking and trail biking. Gay City also has a pond in which swimming is available in season, fishing, picnic areas, cross-country skiing and snowshoeing.

In addition, Hebron has several town parks and ballfields, and the Town Recreation Department has organized sports and other activities throughout the year. The rails-to-trails Airline Trail State Park goes through Hebron, with several access points for walkers, bikers and horseback riders.

== Education ==
The town hosts the regional middle and high school RHAM High School for two adjacent towns, Marlborough and Andover. Additionally, the town operates two elementary schools: Gilead Hill School, covering grades Pre-K through 2, and Hebron Elementary School, which serves grades 3 through 6.

== Notable people ==
- Charles S. Hempstead (1794–1874), businessman, lawyer, served as the first mayor of the city of Galena, Illinois, from 1841-1845.
- Frank Aresti (born 1967), guitarist, Fates Warning
- Christopher Larkin (born 1987), actor, singer-songwriter
- Tom MacArthur (born 1960), congressman
- Samuel Morey (1762–1843), inventor
- William A. Palmer (1781–1860), US Senator and Governor of Vermont
- John Samuel Peters (1772–1858), 26th Governor of Connecticut
- A.J. Pollock (born 1987), outfielder for the Seattle Mariners
- Benjamin Trumbull (1735–1820), historian and preacher
