= Benoni Irwin =

American painter

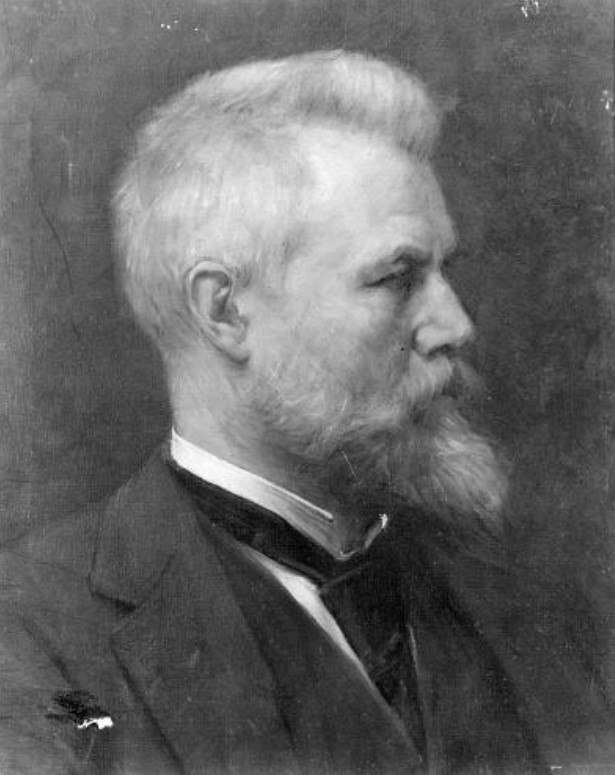
- 1889 Self-Portrait Benoni Irwin
- Born: June 29, 1840; Newmarket, Upper Canada
- Died: August 26, 1896 (aged 56); Coventry Lake, Connecticut
- Relatives: Susan Muriel Irwin MacDonald (daughter)

Benoni Irwin (June 29, 1840 – August 26, 1896) was an American portraitist.

A pupil of the National Academy of Design in New York City, USA, he trained in Paris with the famous French portraitist Emile Auguste Carolus-Duran (1838–1917). His work was shown in the Exposition Universelle at Paris in 1889, and the Chicago World's Fair in 1893. Irwin had studios in San Francisco, Boston, New Bedford, Massachusetts, and New York.

== Early life ==
Benoni Burdeau Irwin was born on June 29, 1840, in Newmarket, Upper Canada to Jared Irwin (1803–1873) and Lydia Kennedy (1807–1871) and moved to upstate New York as a young man. His family were Quakers, originally from the Scottish Borders. The Canadian Irwins were Late Loyalists, i.e. those loyal to the British Crown who emigrated to Canada after the American Revolution had ended. Members of the Irwin family fought against the US during the War of 1812. Despite their participation in the Rebellion of 1837, Benoni Irwin was patronized by a Lieutenant-Governor of Upper Canada, thus launching his career.

== Career ==
He was a pupil of the National Academy of Design in New York City from 1861 to 1863. He spent considerable time in San Francisco, from c. 1871–1877. From 1877–1878, Irwin trained in Paris with the famous French portraitist Emile Auguste Carolus-Duran (1838 – 1917), and exhibited at the Salon de Paris in 1879. He returned to the United States in 1879, where he spent time in Boston and New Bedford, Massachusetts; Louisville, Kentucky, New York City, and Yonkers, throughout the 1880s and 1890s. In 1889 Irwin was elected into the National Academy of Design as an Associate Academician. In 1889, as a stipulation for installment as an Associate National Academician, Irwin painted the self-portrait depicted in this article.

== Personal life ==
In Canada, in 1866, he married Elizabeth Bunner. They had two daughters, Susan and Amelia.

In 1873, while in California, Irwin married Adelaide (Adela) Vellejo Curtis (May 29, 1853–1932). She was the daughter of Lucian Curtis, a copper plate engraver and farmer, born in Coventry, Connecticut and Celia Carlton Perkins, born in Philadelphia, Pennsylvania. The Curtis family had come to San Francisco during the California Gold Rush in 1849 and, at one time, lived in the famous Rancho Petaluma Adobe, owned by General Mariano Vallejo, a family friend. Irwin and Adela had two children, Edith C. (1874–1925) and Constance (b. 1885).

== Death ==
By the 1880s, Irwin and his wife and daughters were living in Yonkers, New York. They had a second home on the shore of Coventry Lake, Connecticut, which the family would visit during the summer. The Irwins were frequent guests of Adela's aunt, Charlotte Curtis Dean, a lifelong Coventry resident. It was here in 1896 that Irwin, while taking photographs of the sunset from a round bottom boat, lost his balance and fell into the lake. Postmortem revealed that Irwin had drowned after being knocked unconscious by hitting his head on the edge of the boat as he fell.

Benoni Irwin is buried with his wife, Adela, and daughter, Edith, in Nathan Hale Cemetery, Coventry, CT.

== Miscellaneous ==
- In 1870, while in Louisville, Kentucky, Irwin lived with American artist Andrew Fisher Bunner (1841–1897), landscape and marine painter
- Irwin was the brother-in-law of American artist Mary Curtis Richardson (1848–1931), known as the Mary Cassatt of the west
- Irwin was a close friend of John Muir, who helped develop Yosemite as a national park.
- Irwin and Harry Chase were very close, often sharing studios. Chase named his son Irwin G. Chase after his friend Benoni Irwin.

== Portraits ==
(partial list)

- John Henry Clifford (1809–1876), Governor of the Commonwealth of Massachusetts, 1853–1854
- Joshua A. Norton, a.k.a. His Imperial Majesty Emperor Norton, self-proclaimed "Emperor of the United States and Protector of Mexico"
- Edward C. Messer, head of the Corcoran Gallery of Art in Washington, D.C. (Metropolitan Museum of Art collection)
- Charles H. Farnham, writer
- Judge David Curtis Sanford (died 1864), of New Milford, Connecticut, member of state senate, 1854; superior court judge in Connecticut, 1854–64
- Emily Bull Sanford, wife of Judge David Curtis Sanford
- William Diamon Black, New Milford, CT resident, son-in-law of Judge David Curtis Sanford
- Carolin Wilson Cooke, Kentucky resident
- Alice Lee Cooke, Kentucky resident
- Thomas Prather Jacob, son of prominent Louisville, KY businessman John Jeremiah Jacob and brother of Richard Taylor Jacob, Lieutenant Governor of Kentucky (1863–64)
- Thomas Newcomb (1843–1906), first president of the Bohemian Club, San Francisco; secretary to the Governor of New York
- Charles Warren Stoddard (1843–1909), American author
- Aimée Crocker (1864–1941), American heiress, princess, mystic and author AKA Amy Crocker Ashe
- Oliver Frazer (1808–1864), Kentucky portrait and miniature painter
- George T. Bromley, prominent San Francisco resident
- Philadelphia Pearson Irwin, his aunt, of Newmarket, Ontario
- Thomas Hughes Irwin, his uncle, also of Newmarket
- Matriarch in Green Velvet (1894). Oil on canvas
- Portrait Of Frederic Remington (1891). Oil on canvas (In the collection of the National Academy of Design)
- Portrait Of A Child In Blue (1880). Oil on canvas
- Portrait Of China Tea Trade Captain Hathaway (1881). Oil on canvas
- Portrait Of A Female Artist (1886). Oil on canvas
- Portrait Of A Young Woman (1883). Watercolor
- The Lute Player. Oil on canvasboard
- ’’Mr. Bowles of Kentucky’’. Oil on canvas, Joshua Bethel Bowles (1795-1873) prominent Louisville, KY banker married to Grace Shreve (1806-1873)
