= Highland Park Market =

Grocery chain based in Manchester, Connecticut

- Founded: 1886; 140 years ago
- Founders: William White
- Number of locations: Manchester, CT Glastonbury, CT Farmington, CT
- Key people: John Devanney, Owner Since 1953
- Website: www.highlandparkmarket.com

Highland Park Market logo

Highland Park Market is a grocery chain based in Manchester, Connecticut, which operates three stores in Hartford.

== History ==
Originally constructed in 1886 by William White, John Devanney purchased the store in 1953 and incorporated it in 1960. The store had many additions and remodels, growing from 900 square feet (84 m^{2}) to 16,000 square feet (1,500 m^{2}).

In October 1976, Highland Park Market of Coventry opened, owned and operated by Mary and David Miner, Devanney's daughter and son-in-law. This branch is operated independently from all the others.

In 1985, the Manchester store expanded (the space was already devoted to the bakery and deli departments).

In March 1992, Highland Park Market of Glastonbury opened.

In December 1993, Timothy J. Devanney bought out his two brothers.

In 1995, Highland Park Market of Farmington opened.

In 2001, Highland Park Market of Suffield opened.

In 2005, Highland Park Market of South Windsor at Evergreen Walk opened.

On June 30, 2010, the South Windsor store was closed due to lagging sales and the poor economic climate.

On August 24, 2021, the sale of the Suffield Store was finalized and became Suffield Village Market

In February 2025, the sale of the Highland Park Market of Coventry was finalized by owner Matt Miner after nearly 50 years of family ownership. Matt had owned & operated it after being transferred ownership by his parents. New owner Harsh Patel said "We're thrilled to carry on the tradition of Highland Park Market [of Coventry] under our new name, Coventry Public Market."
