= Nathan Hale (disambiguation) =

Nathan Hale (1755–1776) was an American spy during the Revolutionary War.

Nathan Hale may also refer to:

== People ==
- Nathan Hale (colonel) (1743–1780), American Revolutionary War officer who died as a prisoner of the British
- Nathan Hale (journalist) (1784–1863), American journalist and newspaper publisher who introduced regular editorial comment
- Nathan W. Hale (1860–1941), U.S. Representative from Tennessee
- Nate Dogg (1969–2011), American hip hop singer born Nathaniel Dwayne Hale
- Nathan Hale (author) (born 1976), American author and illustrator
- Nathan Hale (character), protagonist of the PS3 game Resistance: Fall of Man and its sequel Resistance 2

== Schools ==
- Nathan Hale Middle School in Norwalk, Connecticut
- Nathan Hale High School (disambiguation)

== Others ==
- Fort Nathan Hale, New Haven, Connecticut
- USS Nathan Hale (SSBN-623), an American submarine
- Nathan Hale (fireboat), an emergency vessel operated by the city of New Haven, Connecticut

== See also ==
- Statue of Nathan Hale (disambiguation)
- Nathan Hale Williams (born 1976), American film and television producer
- Nathan K. Hall (1810–1874), U.S. Representative from New York and Postmaster General
