= Bunner =

Bunner is a surname. Notable people with the surname include:

- Andrew F. Bunner (1841–1897), American painter and draughtsman
- Angel Bunner (born 1989), American softball pitcher
- Henry Cuyler Bunner (1855–1896), American novelist and poet
- Rudolph Bunner (1779–1837), American politician

== See also ==
- Buner District
