= Capron-Phillips House =

Historic house in Connecticut, United States

- U.S. National Register of Historic Places
- U.S. Historic district – Contributing property
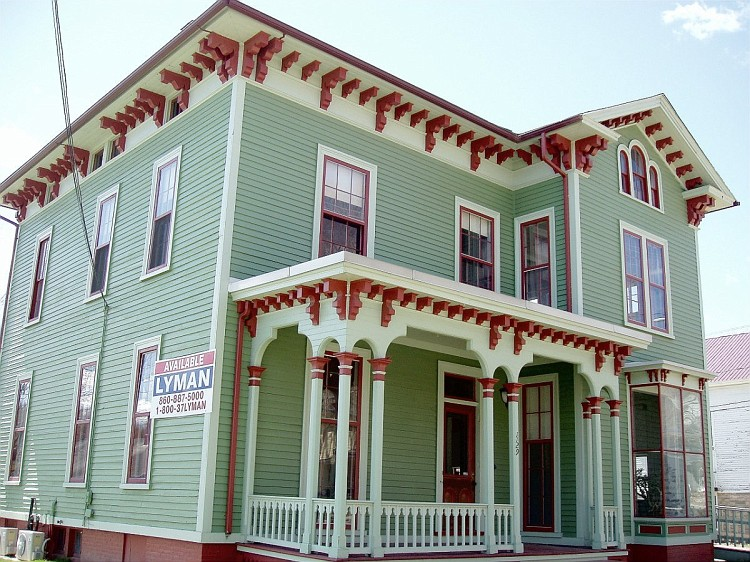

- Location within Connecticut Location within the United States
- Location: 1129 Main Street, Coventry, Connecticut
- Coordinates: 41°46′0″N 72°17′54″W
- Area: 0.4 acres (0.16 ha)
- Built: c. 1864
- Architectural style: Italianate
- Part of: South Coventry Historic District (ID91000482)
- NRHP reference No.: 82004384

Significant dates
- Added to NRHP: April 27, 1982
- Designated CP: May 6, 1991

The Capron-Phillips House is a historic house located at 1129 Main Street in the South Coventry village of Coventry, Connecticut. Built about 1864, it is a well-preserved example of Italianate architecture, retaining significant interior and exterior features. It also served as Coventry's post office and drug store for many years. It was listed on the National Register of Historic Places in 1982, and is a contributing property to the South Coventry Historic District.

== Description and history ==
The Capron-Phillips House is located near the eastern end of the village of South Coventry, on the south side of Main Street (Connecticut Route 31) at its junction with Mason Street. It is a three-story, wood-framed structure with a low-pitch hip roof, and a two-story ell extending to the rear. It has modillioned and bracketed eaves at both the roof line and on the porch. A projecting gable-roofed section at the front features a three-part round-arch window in the gable. Original interior features include plaster cove moulding in the main parlors, carved marble fireplace surrounds, and door and window hardware.

The house was built sometime between 1863, when George Capron purchased the land, and 1868, when he mortgaged the land with this building standing on it. Capron, whose local significance is unknown, sold the house to a bank in 1879, at which time it was apparently in use as the local post office. Subsequent owners continued that use, also operating a drug store on the premises until 1953. It has since seen a variety of mainly commercial uses, although has also seen residential use.

== See also ==
- National Register of Historic Places listings in Tolland County, Connecticut
