= Captain Nathan Hale Monument =

- U.S. National Register of Historic Places
- U.S. Historic district – Contributing property
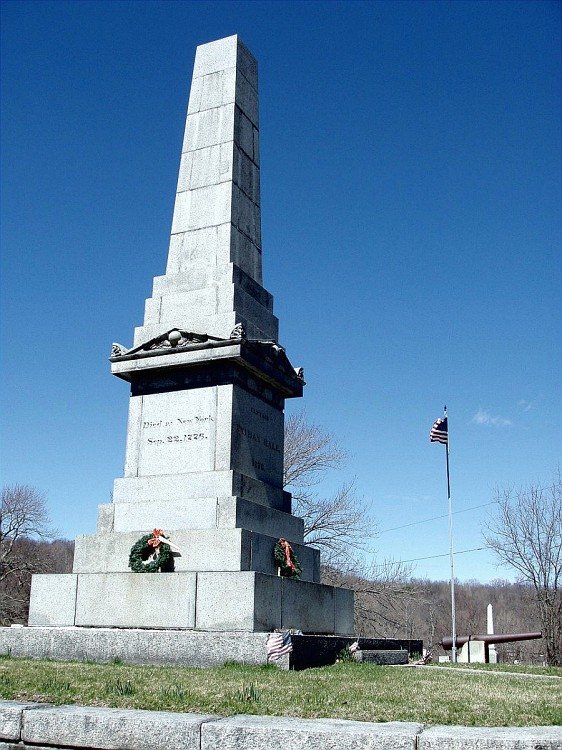

- Location within Connecticut Location within the United States
- Location: 120 Lake Street, Coventry, Connecticut
- Coordinates: 41°46′4″N 72°18′24″W
- Area: less than one acre
- Built: 1846
- Built by: Solomon Willard
- Architect: Henry Austin
- Architectural style: Greek Revival; Exotic Revival
- Part of: South Coventry Historic District (ID91000482)
- NRHP reference No.: 01001531

Significant dates
- Added to NRHP: January 28, 2002
- Designated CP: May 6, 1991

The Captain Nathan Hale Monument is a 45-foot (14 m) obelisk in Coventry, Connecticut, built in 1846 in honor of Nathan Hale, the Revolutionary War hero, who was born in Coventry. It was one of the first war memorials to be built in the United States, and is a significant work of both architect Henry Austin and builder Solomon Willard. Now owned and maintained by the state, it was listed on the National Register of Historic Places in 2002.

== Description and history ==
The Captain Nathan Hale Monument is located in South Coventry village, at the entrance to the Nathan Hale Cemetery on Lake Street. It is set off-center in a roughly rectangular grassy area slightly elevated by a granite retaining wall, part of which serves as the border wall of the cemetery and its entrance drive. The monument is 45 feet (14 m) in height, with a stepped square base, surmounted by a paneled section, above which is a gabled cornice, with the body of the obelisk above. The monument is constructed out of granite quarried in Quincy, Massachusetts, from the same quarries that supplied the Bunker Hill Monument. Each face of the panel section bears an inscription, one of them consisting of Hale's famous quotation "I only regret that I have but one life to lose for my country." The monument's architectural style has been described as Greek Revival and Exotic Revival.

A committee of the town began to consider the construction of a monument to its native son in 1837. At the time, it encountered opposition to war memorials that were fairly typical in the United States at the time, including some resistance from the Hale family, who thought it unseemly. They persevered, and eventually raised private donations and state funds for the effort. The memorial was designed by Henry Austin, a prominent Connecticut architect, and was built in 1846 by Solomon Willard, owner of the Quincy granite quarries. The quarried stone was shipped to Norwich by regional railroads at no cost, and was delivered the rest of the way to Coventry by oxen. A retaining wall made of "massive stones five feet in length" was built in 1894.

The monument was one of the first large-scale monuments in the United States to commemorate an individual or event, preceding the Bunker Hill Monument (completed 1846) and the Washington Monument (completed 1885). Monuments and memorials of this type were not built in significant numbers until after the American Civil War.

== See also ==
- Nathan Hale Homestead
- National Register of Historic Places listings in Tolland County, Connecticut
- Statue of Nathan Hale (disambiguation)
