= Nathan Hale High School =

Nathan Hale High School may refer to:

- Nathan Hale High School (Oklahoma), United States
- Nathan Hale High School (Washington), United States
- Nathan Hale High School (Wisconsin), United States
- Nathan Hale-Ray High School, Connecticut, United States

== See also ==
- Nathan Hale (disambiguation)
- Hale High School (disambiguation)
