= Elisha W. Edgerton =

American politician

Elisha Edgerton

Member of the Wisconsin State Assembly
- In office 1863

Personal details
- Born: June 26, 1815 South Coventry, Connecticut, U.S.
- Died: April 15, 1904 (aged 88) Milwaukee, Wisconsin, U.S.
- Party: Democratic
- Relations: Benjamin Hyde Edgerton (brother)

Elisha W. Edgerton (June 26, 1815 – April 15, 1904) was an American businessman and politician who served as a member of the Wisconsin State Assembly in 1863.

== Early life ==
Edgerton was born in South Coventry, Connecticut.

== Career ==
Edgerton worked in New York City and Chicago, Illinois before moving to Milwaukee, Wisconsin Territory to work for Solomon Juneau. Edgerton worked in the grain, tobacco, and livestock business and eventually established a model farm in Summit, Waukesha County, Wisconsin. Edgerton served in the first Wisconsin Constitutional Convention of 1846 and in the Wisconsin State Assembly in 1863. Edgerton was a member of the Democratic Party of Wisconsin.

== Personal life ==
His brother was Benjamin Hyde Edgerton, a businessman and territorial legislator. Edgerton died in Milwaukee, Wisconsin.
