= Wangumbaug Lake =

Lake in Connecticut, US

- Coventry Lake
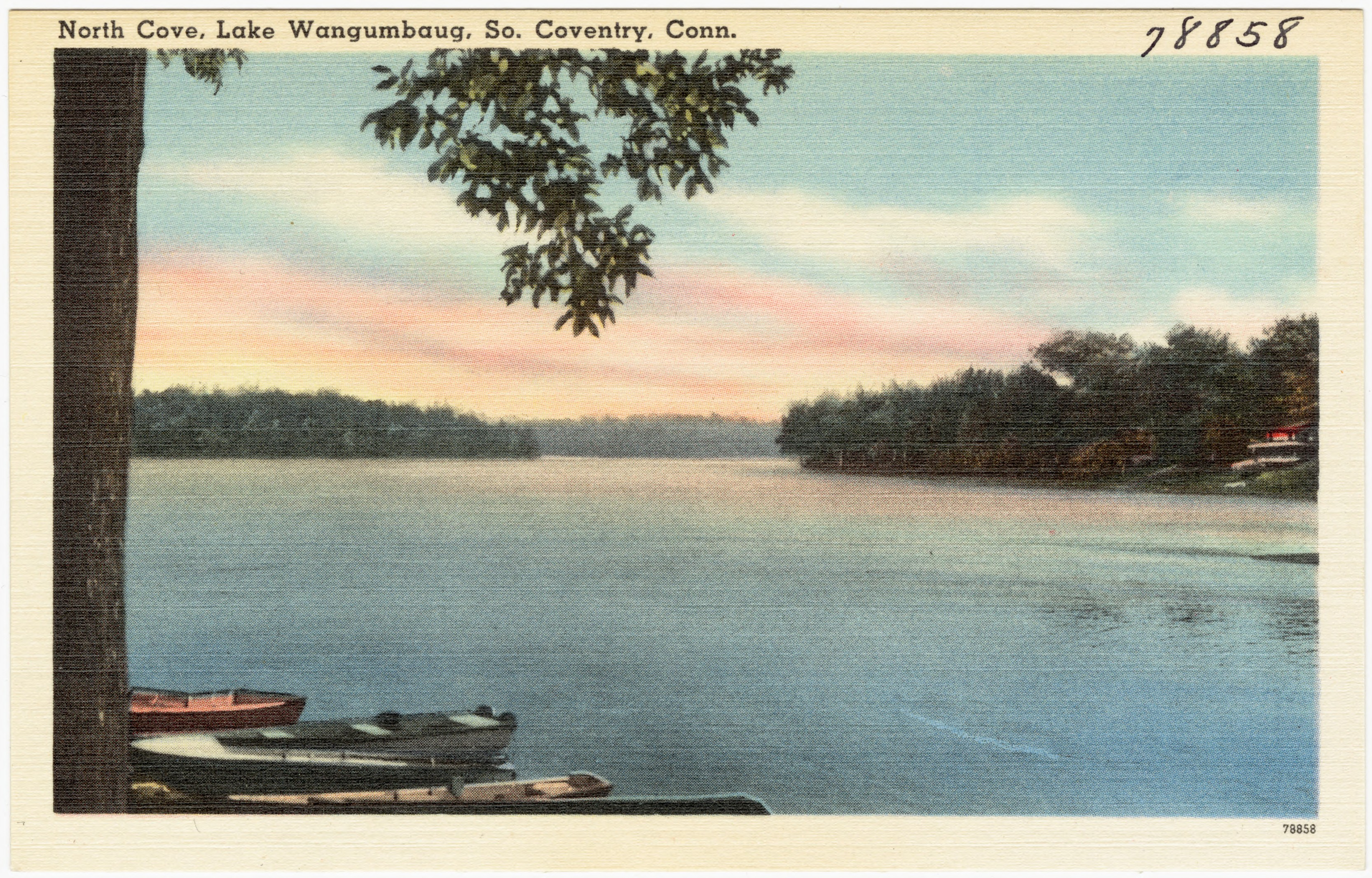

- Location within the United States
- Location: Connecticut, US
- Coordinates: 41.773°N 72.327°W
- Type: Glacial lake
- Basin countries: United States
- Max. length: 1.8 mi (2.9 km)
- Surface area: 0.59 sq mi (1.5 km^{2})
- Average depth: 35 ft (11 m)
- Shore length^{1}: 5 mi (8.0 km)
- Settlements: Coventry, Connecticut
- ^{1} Shore length is not a well-defined measure.

Wangumbaug Lake, also known as Coventry Lake, is a natural lake located in Coventry, Connecticut. It covers 378 acres (1.53 km^{2}) and is about 35 feet (11 m) deep and 1.8 miles (2.9 km) long with a circumference of 5 miles (8.0 km). Its watershed is 1,992 acres (8.06 km^{2}), around 40% of which is residential and the rest farms and forest. The lake holds 2.7 billion gallons (10,220,000 m³) of water. It is fed by springs and has one natural outlet, Coventry Lake Brook, which flows southeast into the Willimantic River. Melt from a retreating glacier formed the lake 13,000 years ago.

Wangumbaug means "Crooked Pond" in Algonquian. It was likely named by the Nipmuc, who settled the area before European contact.

The lake has been a popular summer vacation destination for boaters and bathers. Artists flocked to the summer cottages along the shores. In the early twentieth century, a trolley line connected the towns of Coventry and Willimantic, and Wangumbaug Lake became known as "Willimantic's summer resort." A pavilion known as the Lakeside Casino was a popular dance hall. Wangumbaug Lake is currently the home of the UConn Huskies rowing team, which shares its boathouse with the Edwin O. Smith High School crew team from nearby Mansfield.

A two-acre lake island, Underwood Island, is located 100 yards from Wangumbaug's shoreline. The village and census-designated place of Coventry Lake includes the lake and surrounding residential areas. The regional climate is hemiboreal.

Wangumbaug Lake

Climate chart (precipitation, max. and min. temperature)
J	F	M	A	M	J	J	A	S	O	N	D
112 −2 −9	132 1 −5	93 8 −2	109 18 5	114 22 8	163 22 13	114 23 17	120 25 17	101 21 13	89 15 8	115 8 2	169 2 −3
- █ Average max. and min. temperatures in °C
- █ Precipitation totals in mm
Imperial conversion
J	F	M	A	M	J	J	A	S	O	N	D
4.4 28 16	5.2 34 23	3.7 46 28	4.3 64 41	4.5 72 46	6.4 72 55	4.5 73 63	4.7 77 63	4 70 55	3.5 59 46	4.5 46 36	6.7 36 27
- █ Average max. and min. temperatures in °F
- █ Precipitation totals in inches
