= Coventry Glass Factory Historic District =

Historic district in Connecticut, United States

- U.S. National Register of Historic Places
- U.S. Historic district
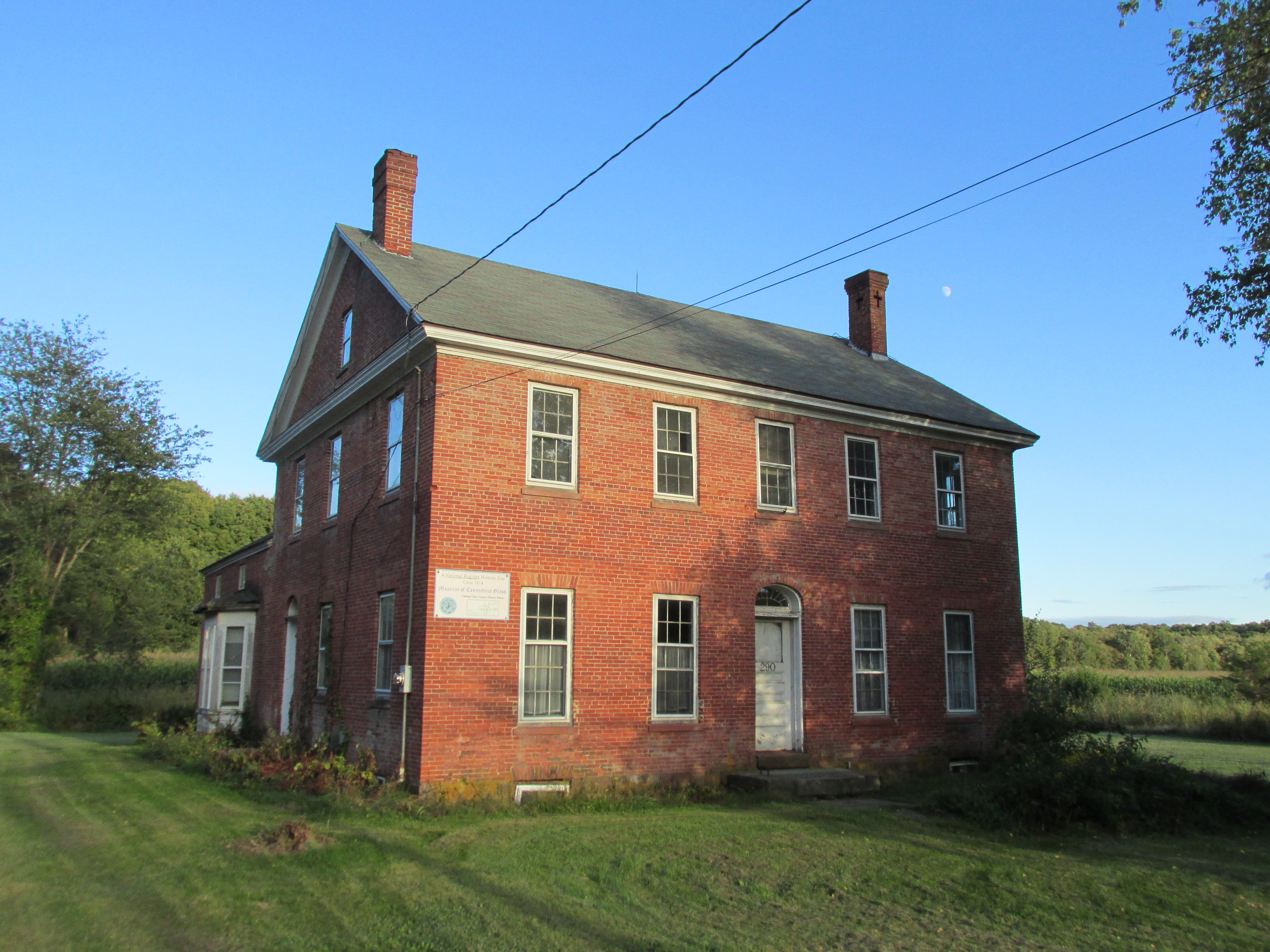
- House at the corner of US Route 44 and North River Road

- Location within Connecticut Location within the United States
- Location: US 44 and North River Road, Coventry, Connecticut
- Coordinates: 41°47′56″N 72°21′2″W
- Area: 32 acres (13 ha)
- Architectural style: Federal; Greek Revival
- NRHP reference No.: 87000806
- Added to NRHP: August 27, 1987

The Coventry Glass Factory Historic District is a 32-acre (13 ha) historic district in Coventry, Connecticut that was listed on the National Register of Historic Places in 1987. The listing encompasses ten historically significant houses, clustered near the site of the former Coventry Glass Factory, in a linear district along what was the Boston Turnpike, now U.S. Route 44. The Skungamaug River is a creek cutting through the district. The glassworks operated here between 1813 and about 1845, and most of these houses date to that time, exhibiting largely vernacular Federal and Greek Revival styles. The most sophisticated and best-preserved house is that of Nathaniel Root, at 1044 Boston Turnpike. The ground in the area of the glassworks (of which no structures survive) is littered with melted glass fragments and burnt brick fragments.

The Coventry Glassworks was established in 1813, in part to meet demand for glass objects that had previously been fulfilled by English companies, a source cut off by the War of 1812. The glassworks founders included experienced glassblowers and local businessmen, who combined their capital and expertise. The company produced small bottles, inkstands, and flasks, and is credited with creating the first "portrait flask", bearing a depiction of the Marquis de Lafayette in commemoration of his 1825 visit to the United States. The company had a rotating cast of partners and glassblowers, and remained in operation until about 1845, when its proprietors at that time moved the business to Willington. Most of the houses in this area were built by or for either the proprietors, or the workers they hired.

== See also ==
- National Register of Historic Places listings in Tolland County, Connecticut
