= Benjamin Hyde Edgerton =

American businessman

Alderman of the Milwaukee Common Council
- In office 1847–1848

Personal details
- Born: August 17, 1811 Saybrook, Connecticut, U.S.
- Died: December 9, 1886 (aged 75) Chicago, Illinois, U.S.
- Spouse: Sophia Hosmer (m. 1837)
- Relations: Elisha W. Edgerton (brother)

Benjamin Hyde Edgerton (August 17, 1811 – December 9, 1886) was an American engineer, businessman, pioneer, and politician.

== Early life and education ==
Edgerton was born in Saybrook, Connecticut on August 17, 1811. Edgerton studied to be a surveyor in Buffalo, New York.

== Career ==
After moving to Green Bay, Michigan Territory, in 1835, he worked for the government as a surveyor and civil engineer. While in Green Bay, Edgerton was chosen to the seventh Michigan Territorial Council (the Rump Council) in 1835, including the western area of the Michigan Territory (present day Wisconsin and parts of North Dakota, South Dakota, Iowa and Minnesota) to provide for a smooth transition involving the establishment of Wisconsin Territory and the admission of the State of Michigan. Edgerton helped survey the city blocks in Milwaukee, Wisconsin and the railroads in Wisconsin. He served on the first harbor commission in Milwaukee and was an alderman of the Milwaukee Common Council from 1847 to 1848.

== Personal life ==
Edgerton married Sophia Hosmer in 1837. He died at his home in Chicago, Illinois, on December 9, 1886. His brother was Elisha W. Edgerton, a businessman and state legislator.
