= George N. Barnard =

American photographer (1819–1902)

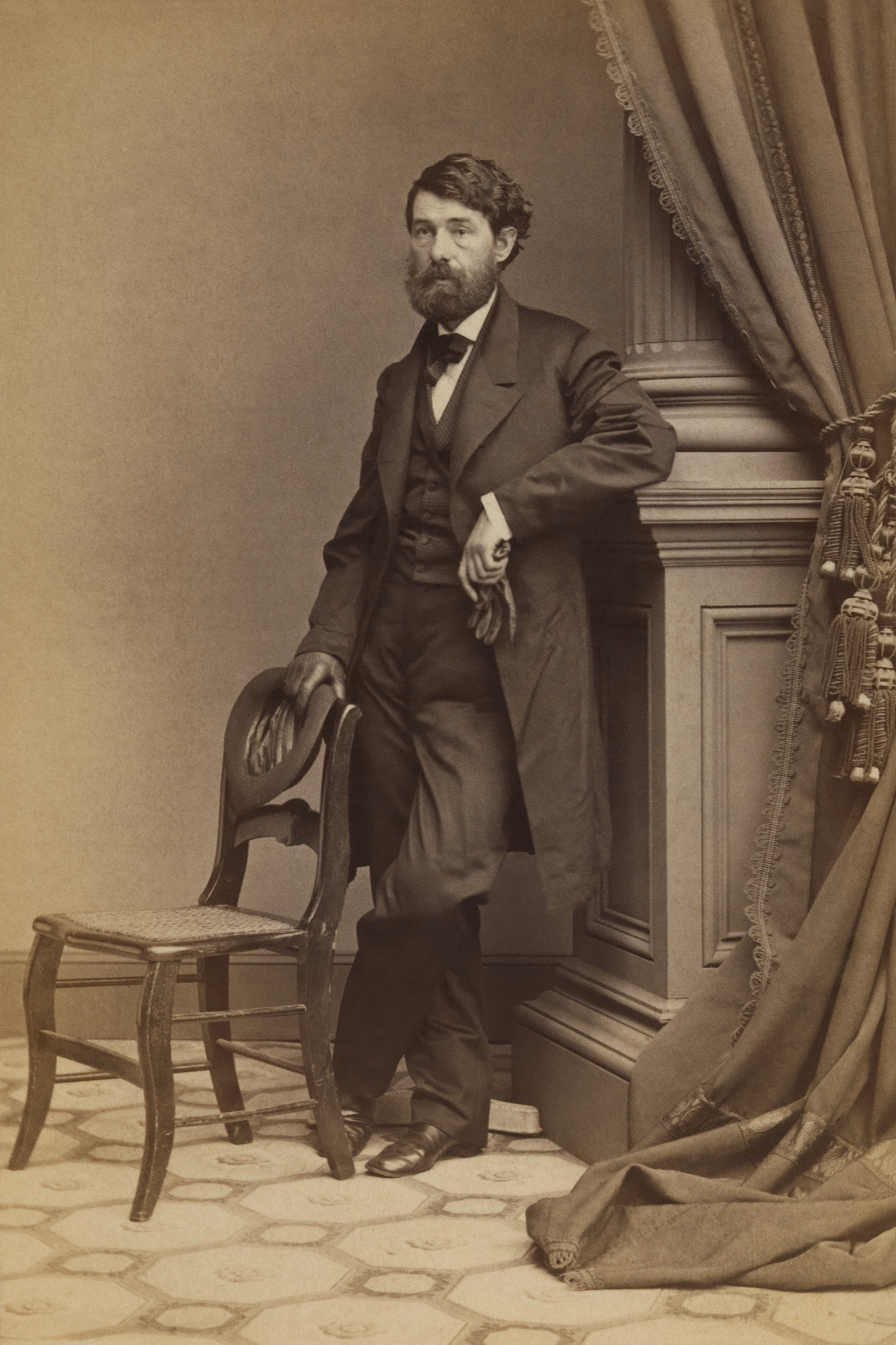
- Portrait of Barnard by Mathew Brady, c. 1865
- Born: December 23, 1819; Coventry, Connecticut, U.S.
- Died: February 4, 1902 (aged 82); Cedarvale, New York, U.S.
- Occupation: Photographer

George Norman Barnard (December 23, 1819 – February 4, 1902) was an American photographer most well known for his photographs from the American Civil War era. He is often noted as G. N. Barnard.

== Early life ==
Barnard was born into a farming family in Coventry, Connecticut on December 23, 1819. His father died in 1826 and he grew up with relatives in a nearby town, apprenticing at various jobs in the family owned businesses. He married in 1843 and moved to Oswego, New York, where he briefly got into the hotel business before turning to photography.

== Career ==
Starting his business in New York State in 1843, Barnard was one of the first to use daguerreotype, the first commercially available form of photography, in the United States.

A fire in 1853 destroyed the grain elevators in Oswego, New York, an event Barnard photographed. Historians consider these some of the first "news" photographs. Barnard also photographed Abraham Lincoln's 1861 inauguration.

=== Civil War ===
Barnard is best known for American Civil War era photos. He was the official army photographer for the Military Division of the Mississippi commanded by Union general William T. Sherman; that position mostly involved photographing and documenting fortifications, bridges, and documents.

His 1866 book, Photographic Views of Sherman's Campaign, showed the devastation of the war. The book includes 61 albumen prints including Nashville, the Chattanooga Valley, Atlanta, and Savannah. He took the photos while operating under General Sherman's command. The book also includes a studio portrait of Sherman and his generals.

=== Post-war ===
After the war, Barnard ran photography studios in Ohio, Charleston, South Carolina and Chicago. His Chicago studio burned down in the 1871 city fire. In Rochester, New York, he briefly worked with George Eastman, the founder of the Eastman Kodak Company.

== Collections ==
Barnard's work is included in the American Memory collection, Selected Civil War Photographs from the Library of Congress, Washington, D.C., 1861–1865. The J. Paul Getty Museum, in Los Angeles, has one of his works and the MoMA also has his work in their collection.

== Gallery of work ==
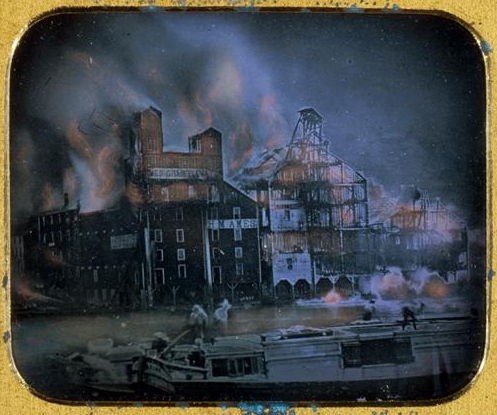
Hand-tinted daguerreotype of the Fire at the Ames and Dolittle Mills, 1853, considered one of the first news photographs.

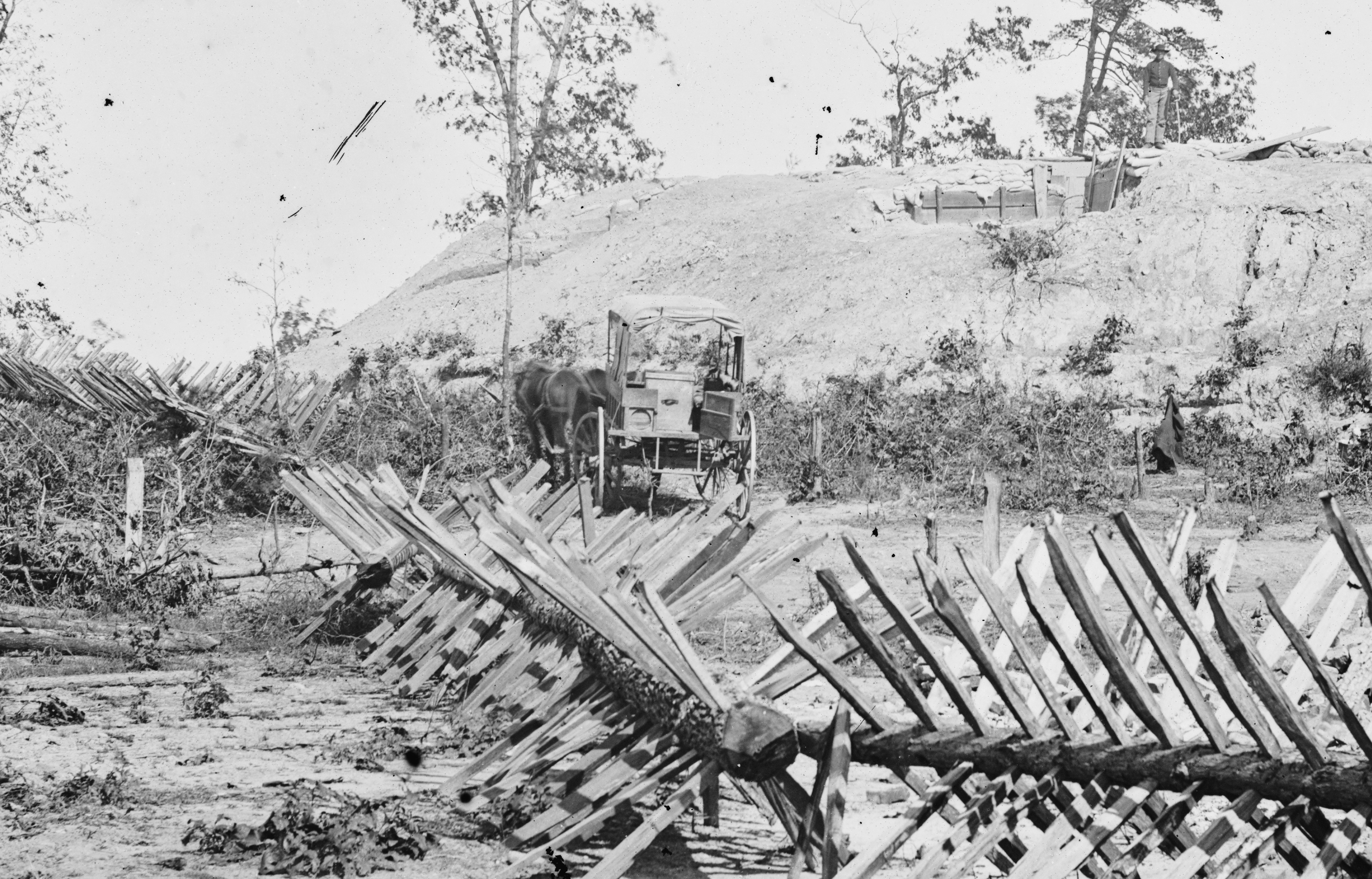
Confederate Army fortification around Atlanta with photographers' buggy in the background, 1864

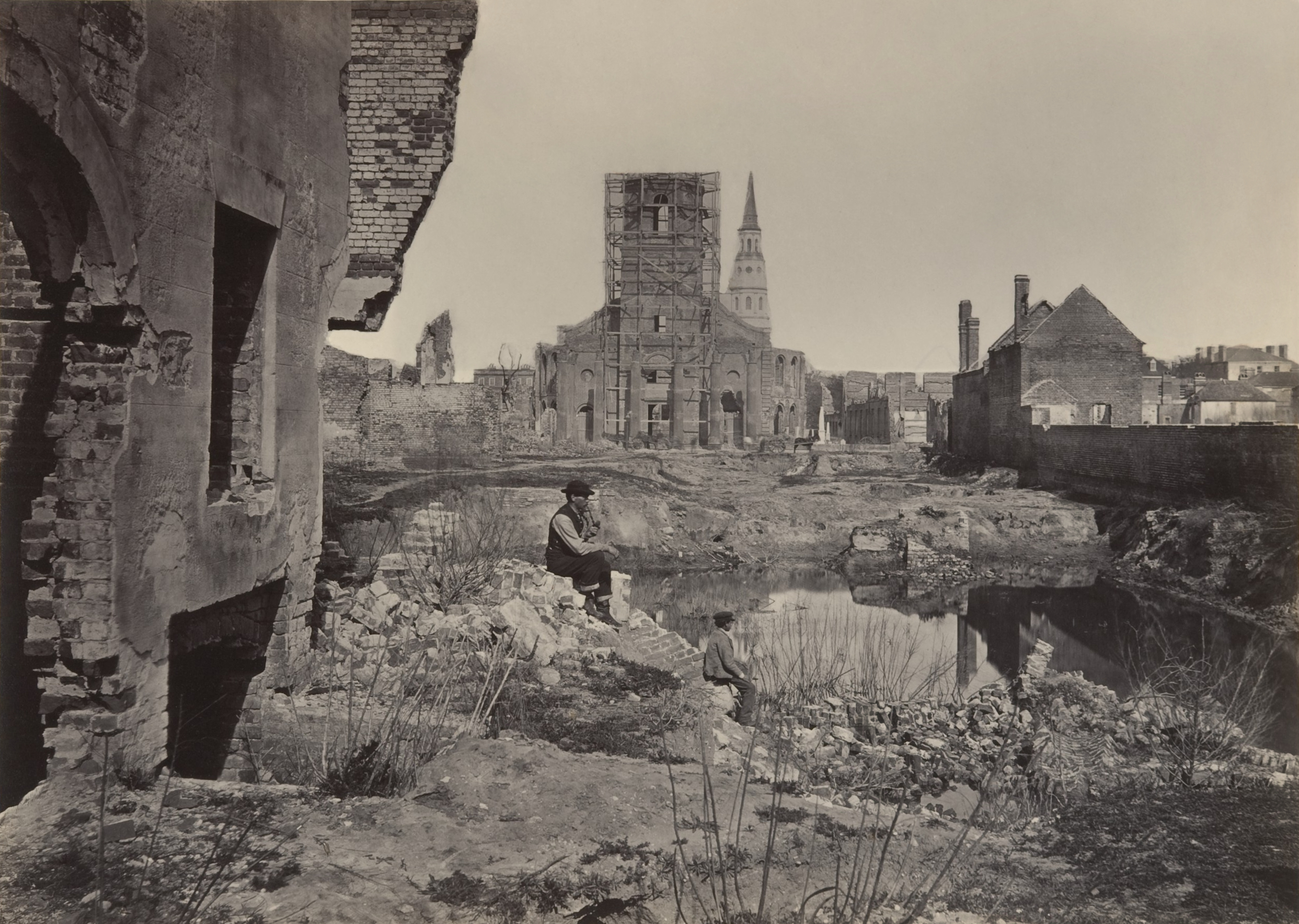
"Ruins in Charleston, S.C." from Photographic Views of Sherman's Campaign, 1865 or 1866

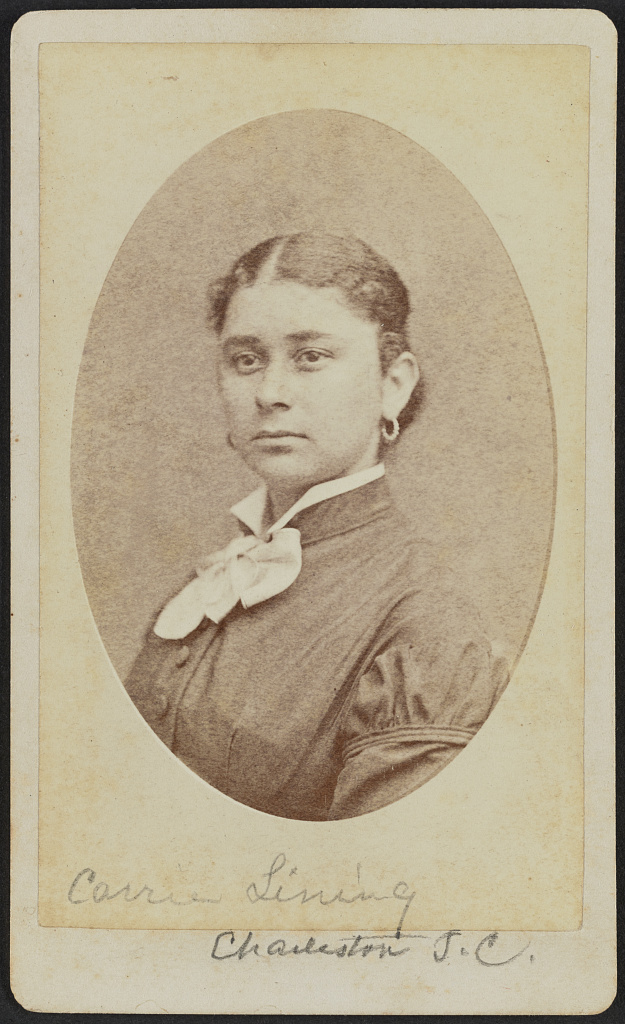
"Portrait of Carrie Lining"

== See also ==
- Photographers of the American Civil War
