= Brick School House (Coventry, Connecticut) =

Coventry Brick School House
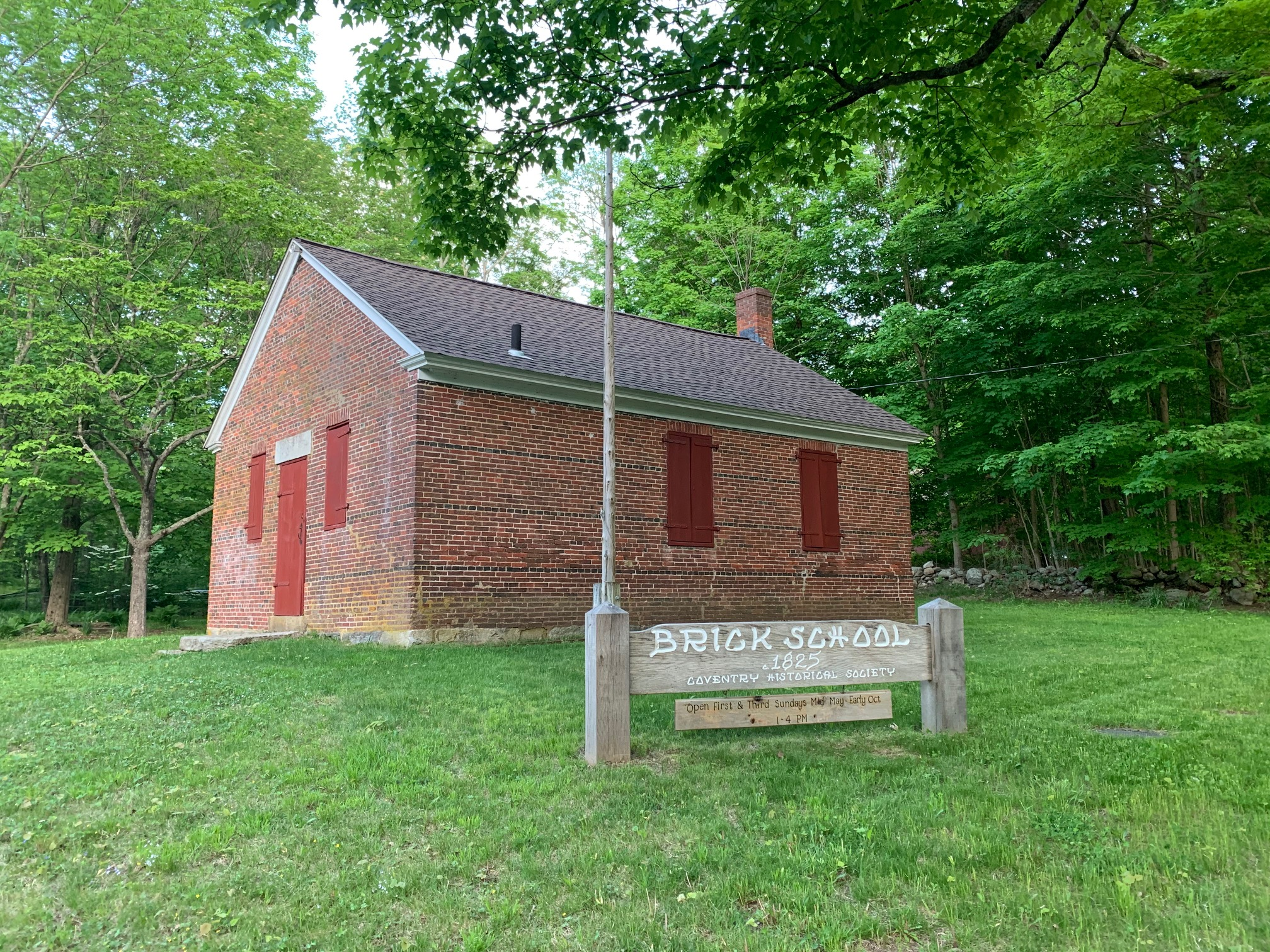

- Location within Connecticut
- Established: 1825
- Location: 1019 Merrow Road; Coventry, Connecticut 06238; USA
- Coordinates: 41.818409°N 72.343786°W
- Type: Local history museum
- Website: ctcoventryhistoricalsociety.dreamhosters.com

The Brick School House is a local history museum in Coventry, Connecticut. The small brick building functioned as a one-room school from 1825 to 1953. It is the only one-room schoolhouse open to the public in Connecticut.

The Brick School House is owned and managed by the Coventry Historical Society. The interior features nineteenth-century school desks and displays of photographs and other memorabilia donated by former pupils and teachers. The museum is open to the public on the first and third Sundays of the month, May through October. Admission, including tours, is free. The museum is known locally for its "Sundae on a Sunday" ice cream social on Father's Day.

Mabel Walbridge Hall had taught at the schoolhouse from 1913-1925 as had her grandmother and mother before her. In 1967, Hall persuaded the town council to sell the schoolhouse to the Coventry Historical Society for $1. Hall wrote the booklet The Brick School Story (Coventry Historical Society, 1977) to raise funds for the schoolhouse's restoration.
