= Adelma Simmons =

American herbalist

Adelma Simmons

Adelma Grenier Simmons (December 16, 1903 – December 3, 1997) was an American herbalist and author. She was one of the leading herbal figures in America in the 20th century. A legend for her knowledge of herbal lore and history, she was also a prolific author and sparked an interest in herb gardening across the country. Known as "The First Lady of Herbs," she owned and operated Caprilands Herb Farm in Coventry, Connecticut, for over 55 years.

== Early life ==
Adelma A. Grenier was born December 16, 1903, in Sheldon, Vermont. She was the daughter of Albert Norman Grenier, a barber of French-Canadian descent, and his wife Abigail (née Crowe). When Simmons was 6 years old, the family lived in Cambridge, VT but relocated to nearby St. Albans before she was 15.

By 1930, the family had moved to Holyoke, Massachusetts and Simmons worked as a buyer, designer and decorator for the Albert Steiger Company, a department store based in Springfield in Massachusetts. Her parents had also found work with the company although they wished to return to the country life.

== Caprilands Herb Farm ==
Though sometimes said to have been founded by Simmons in 1929, records show the family was still living in Massachusetts at that time. Caprilands was to be the name of the 50-acre (200,000 m^{2}) plot of land in Coventry, CT bought by the Grenier family around 1930. The large 18th-century farmhouse and outbuildings sat upon the grounds of a failed dairy farm. The land had been neglected and was of poor farming quality due to the large number of glacial boulders and wetlands.

Simmons is said to have made her first attempt growing vegetables while running a goat farm on the property, finding that goats thrived on the rocky terrain; hence the name, Caprilands, capri being the Latin root for goat. Though interesting, goat farming was not very lucrative. In the 1940s, after a devastating vegetable season resulting in the death of her crop, Simmons turned her attention toward growing herbs. Herbs, similar to weeds, thrived on the land.

After several decades of determination and effort, Simmons herb farm flourished.

The farmhouse is being relocated to Stanfordville, NY.

== Later life ==
Though only 5 feet (1.5 m) in height, she was an imposing figure who was always seen in public wearing a custom pileolus hat and a cape.

Simmons died on December 3, 1997. in her bedroom at her beloved Caprilands Herb Farm in Coventry, CT. Simmons' will left her entire estate to a nonprofit educational institute. The Caprilands Institute would further the research and education in herbs, plants and flowers that Mrs. Simmons lectured upon and many of which were displayed in her gardens.

== Personal life ==
- Simmons was married three times. Her first marriage was short-lived and ended in divorce. Her second marriage was to George Simmons, which lasted until his death in 1965. She last married in 1993 to Edward Werner Cook, presently executor of her estate.
- Celebrity chef David Bouley used to bike to the Simmons farm from his childhood home in nearby Willimantic, CT. Even after opening his famed restaurant, Bouley, in New York City, his staff and close friends made annual pilgrimages to the farm, making it possible for Bouley to teach his staff what Simmons taught him.
- Mrs. Simmons was the author of many books. The International Herb Association presented Adelma Simmons with a lifetime achievement award.

== Partial bibliography ==
- 1964 Herb Gardening in Five Seasons
- 1968 A Merry Christmas Herbal
- 1969 Herbs to Grow Indoors; For Flavor, For Fragrance, For Fun
- 1972 The Illustrated Herbal Handbook
- 1974 Herb Gardens of Delight, with Plants for Every Mood and Purpose
- 1980 The Caprilands Kitchen Book : Economy Cooking with Herbs
- 1981 A Witches Brew
- 1983 The World of Rosemary
- 1987 Herbs Through the Seasons at Caprilands
- 1987 The Caprilands Wreath Book
- 1987 Herbs are Good Companions : To Vegetables in the Garden : To Cooks in the Kitchen
- 1989 Country Wreaths from Caprilands : The Legend, Lore, and Design of Traditional Herbal Wreaths
- 1990 Tea and Tranquility
- 1991 Seasonal Wreaths from Caprilands : Holiday Celebrations with Herbal Wreath Lore and Design
- 1991 Seasonal Herbs from Caprilands : Step-by-step in the Garden
- 1992 The World of Herbs & Flowers : A Guide to Growing, Preserving, Cooking, Potpourri, Sachets and Wreaths
- 1992 World of Fragrance : Potpourri and Sachets from Caprilands
- 1992 Herbs are Forever Caprilands' Guide to Growing and Preserving
- 1992 A Year in Wreaths : Caprilands' Guide to Wreaths
- 1992 The Pride of Cooks : Herbal Recipes from the Caprilands Kitchen
- 1992 Caprilands Herbs and Festivals : Part I Winter Ways
- 1993 Caprilands Herbs and Festivals : Part II Easter Joys & Herbal Magic
- 1995 Caprilands Herbal Soups for All Seasons
- 1996 Appetizers Delicious Easy to Prepare
- 1996 Pasta Cookbook: Pasta and Noodles from Around
- 1996 Fish and Seafood
- The Little Book of Scented Geraniums
- The Strawberry Book
- Plants of Shakespeare
- The Little Book of Thyme
- Autumn at Caprilands
- Saints in My Garden
- Caprilands Breads for All Reasons
- Desserts, Pies, Cakes, Puddings, Tarts, Crepes
- The Book of Valentine Remembrances
