= Loomis-Pomeroy House =

Historic house in Connecticut, United States

- U.S. National Register of Historic Places
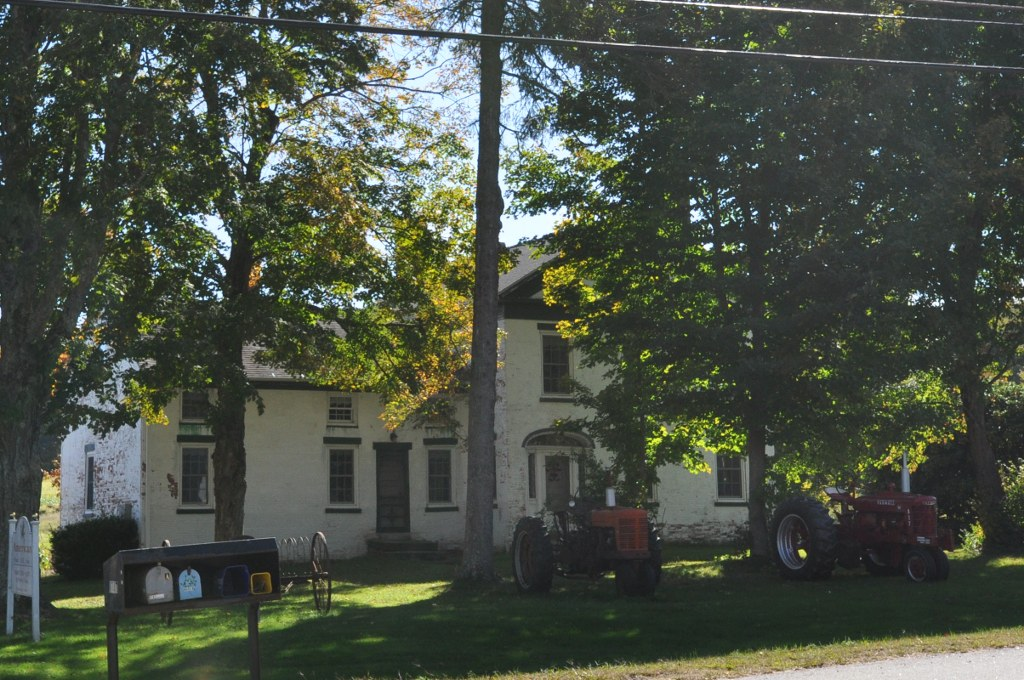

- Location within Connecticut Location within the United States
- Location: 1747 Boston Turnpike, Coventry, Connecticut
- Coordinates: 41°47′52″N 72°22′35″W
- Area: 3.8 acres (1.5 ha)
- Built: c. 1833
- Architectural style: Federal, Greek Revival
- NRHP reference No.: 94000370
- Added to NRHP: April 26, 1994

The Loomis-Pomeroy House is a historic house at 1747 Boston Turnpike (United States Route 44) in Coventry, Connecticut. Built about 1833, it is a fine local example of transitional Federal-Greek Revival architecture, with important family associations in local history. The house was listed on the National Register of Historic Places in 1994.

== Description and history ==
The Loomis-Pomeroy House is located in what has historically been called the village of North Coventry, on the south side of US 44, west of its junction with Main Street. US 44 is in this area part of the historic Boston Post Road, and the cluster of buildings making up the village includes the Second Congregational Church, directly across the street from the house. The house is a predominantly brick structure, its main block a 2 1/2-story structure, three bays wide, with an attached ell with a brick and clapboard exterior. Historically the house was on a 100-acre (40 ha) farm, this has been reduced over time to 3.8 acres (1.5 ha), which includes the house, a barn, an ice house, and a privy.

The main block was probably built c. 1833, with the ell possibly older. A building is referenced on the property in an 1823 deed, which may have been the ell, which is thought to have served as overflow housing for a nearby tavern operated by the Pomeroy family. The Pomeroys established the tavern in 1801, next to the church, whose congregation was established in 1745. Eleazer Pomeroy, in addition to operating the tavern, also ran stagecoaches, and had acquired a large amount of land in the area by 1828. He is believed to be the builder of this house, which was sold to his son George in 1843. In 1881 the property was purchased by James Otis Freeman, whose descendants (mainly named Loomis after the man his daughter married), retained ownership until the 1980s.

== See also ==
- National Register of Historic Places listings in Tolland County, Connecticut
