= Brigham's Tavern =

Historic tavern in Connecticut, United States

- U.S. National Register of Historic Places
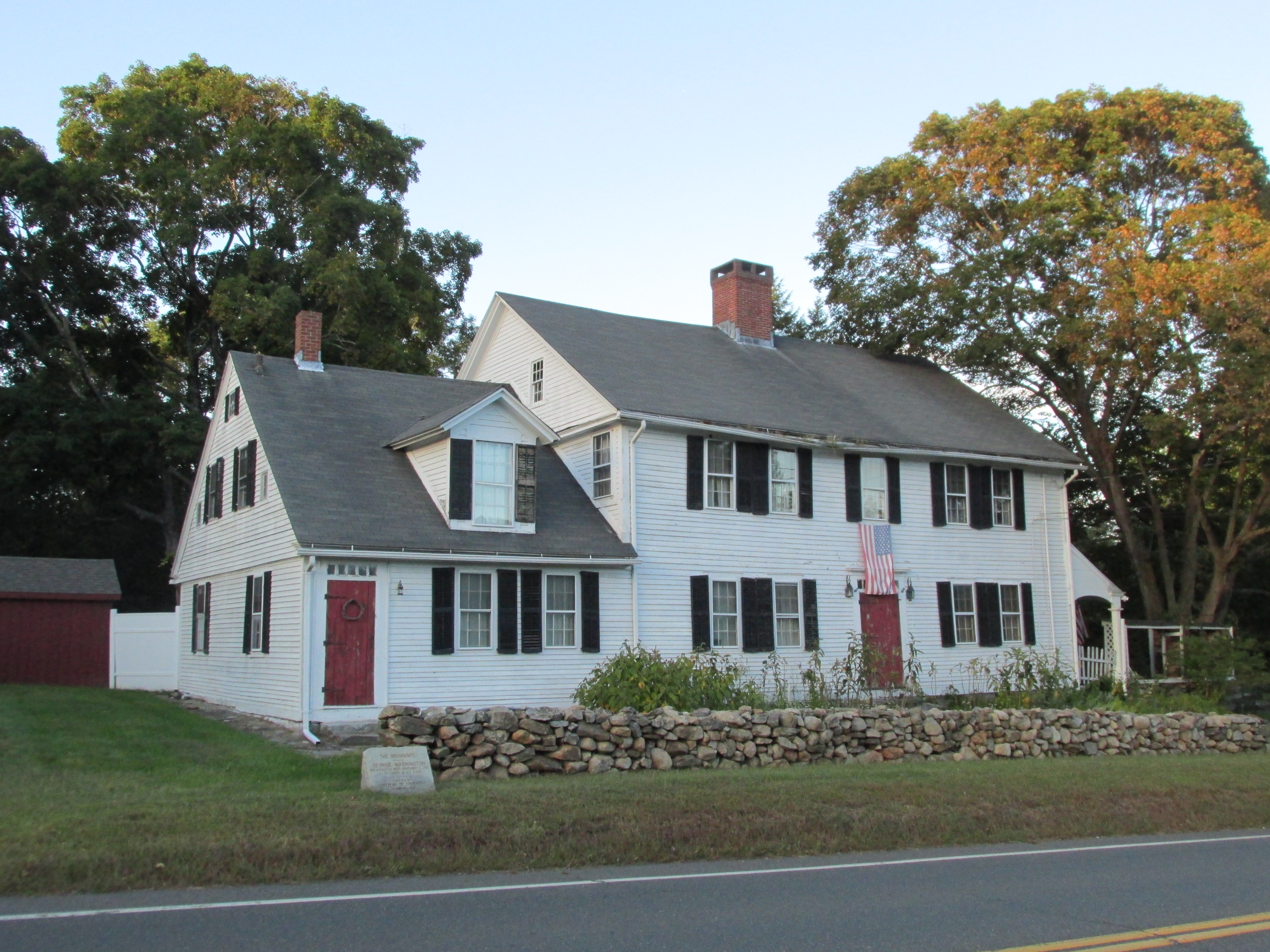
- Brigham's Tavern

- Location within Connecticut Location within the United States
- Location: 12 Boston Turnpike, Coventry, Connecticut
- Coordinates: 41°47′58″N 72°18′53″W
- Area: 1 acre (0.40 ha)
- Built: c. 1717; 1778
- Built by: Gershom Brigham
- Architectural style: Georgian
- NRHP reference No.: 82004383
- Added to NRHP: March 25, 1982

Brigham's Tavern is a historic house and traveller's accommodation at 12 Boston Turnpike in Coventry, Connecticut. With a construction history dating to the early 18th century, it is one of the town's oldest buildings, and is historically associated with George Washington, who stopped here for a meal in 1789. Now a private residence, it was listed on the National Register of Historic Places in 1982.

== Description and history ==
The former Brigham's Tavern is located in far northeastern Coventry, at the northeast corner of Boston Turnpike (United States Route 44) and Brigham Tavern Road, a short distance west of the town line with Mansfield. It is a clapboarded two-story wood-frame structure, with a gabled roof, central chimney, and clapboarded exterior. The main facade is five bays wide, with a center entrance flanked by simple moulded corner boards and topped by a four-light transom and cornice. Two large additions extend from the rear and left of the main block. The left ell has an entrance similar in style to the main entrance. These three sections of the house are all of 18th century origin, with the rear addition believed to be the oldest part, dating to c. 1717. An 18th-century barn stands at the rear of the property.

The tavern had a long history, serving travellers on the turnpike between Hartford and Boston. Uriah Brigham is the first documented resident of the property, believed to have occupied what is now the rear ell of the main block. His son Gershom is credited with building the main block in 1778, having gained official sanction to operate a tavern from the town. The building was clearly purpose-built as a tavern, with a second-floor ballroom and a first-floor taproom, although the bar elements of the latter have been lost. The tavern played host to George Washington in 1789 for breakfast, after he spent the night at a residence in Mansfield.

More recently the home has been lived in by the William's Family (Erik, Alyssa, Boston, Maryjane). An in-ground pool has been built into the backyard and the interior of the living room has been redone. The table where George Washington ate breakfast at is currently at the Nathan Hale Homestead in Coventry.

== See also ==
- National Register of Historic Places listings in Tolland County, Connecticut
