= Muriel Irwin MacDonald =

American journalist and editor (1867 - 1918)

- Born: Susan Muriel Irwin; July 1, 1867; Newmarket, Ontario, Canada
- Died: February 28, 1918 (aged 50); Mineola, New York, U.S.
- Occupations: journalist; newspaper and magazine editor; rancher
- Employers: Los Angeles Times; The Craftsman; The Delineator; Housewives' League Magazine; The Forecast Magazine; New-York Tribune
- Spouse: Norman MacDonald (m. 1901; died 1903)
- Children: 1 daughter
- Father: Benoni Irwin

Muriel Irwin MacDonald (1867-1918) was a Canadian-born American journalist and editor, remembered as a pioneer woman reporter of California. MacDonald also owned a raisin-grape ranch in Kings County, California.

== Early life and education ==
Susan Muriel Irwin was born in Newmarket, Ontario, July 1, 1867. Her parents were Benoni Irwin, A.N.A., a painter, and Elizabeth Beardsley (Bunner) Irwin.

She grew up in Hanford, California at the home of her uncle, Edwin P. Irwin, the county surveyor. Mr. Irwin was one of the pioneer settlers of this section. MacDonald came to live with her uncle when just a child and grew up to adulthood here.

She was educated for the most part in the schools of Tulare County and Kings County, California.

She was educated at home and by tutors.

== Career ==
MacDonald was the author of magazine articles and editorials, chiefly on political, social and ethical questions. Her first experience in metropolitan journalism, was from 1895 to 1900, when she was a reporter, special writer, dramatic critic and Sunday editor for the Los Angeles Times.

After resigning her position, she went to New York and for a time was engaged in miscellaneous newspaper and magazine work. During the period of 1905 through 1910, she served as managing editor and, later, contributing editor of The Craftsman. In 1911, she was the managing editor of The Delineator, and in 1913, she was the inaugural editor of Housewives' League Magazine. In July 1914, she quit that periodical and took a position on the editorial staff of The Forecast Magazine, published in the interest of pure food. During the last two years of her life, she edited the woman's page of the New-York Tribune.

For many years, MacDonald owned a raisin-grape ranch in central California. For several years during the latter part of her life, MacDonald desired to return there and take charge of her two vineyards in Kings County, while putting her daughter into the educational institutions of California.

MacDonald was a member of the Housewives League, Woman's Municipal League, Woman Suffrage Party, and the Pen and Brush Club.

== Personal life ==
On August 18, 1901, she married Norman MacDonald (died 1903), a civil engineer. They had one daughter, Isabel Katharine Bunner (born 1902).

MacDonald favored woman suffrage. In religion, she was Episcopalian. In politics, she favored Progressivism.

Susan Muriel Irwin MacDonald died at Long Island Hospital in Mineola, New York on February 28, 1918.
