= Coventry, Connecticut =

- Town
- Town of Coventry
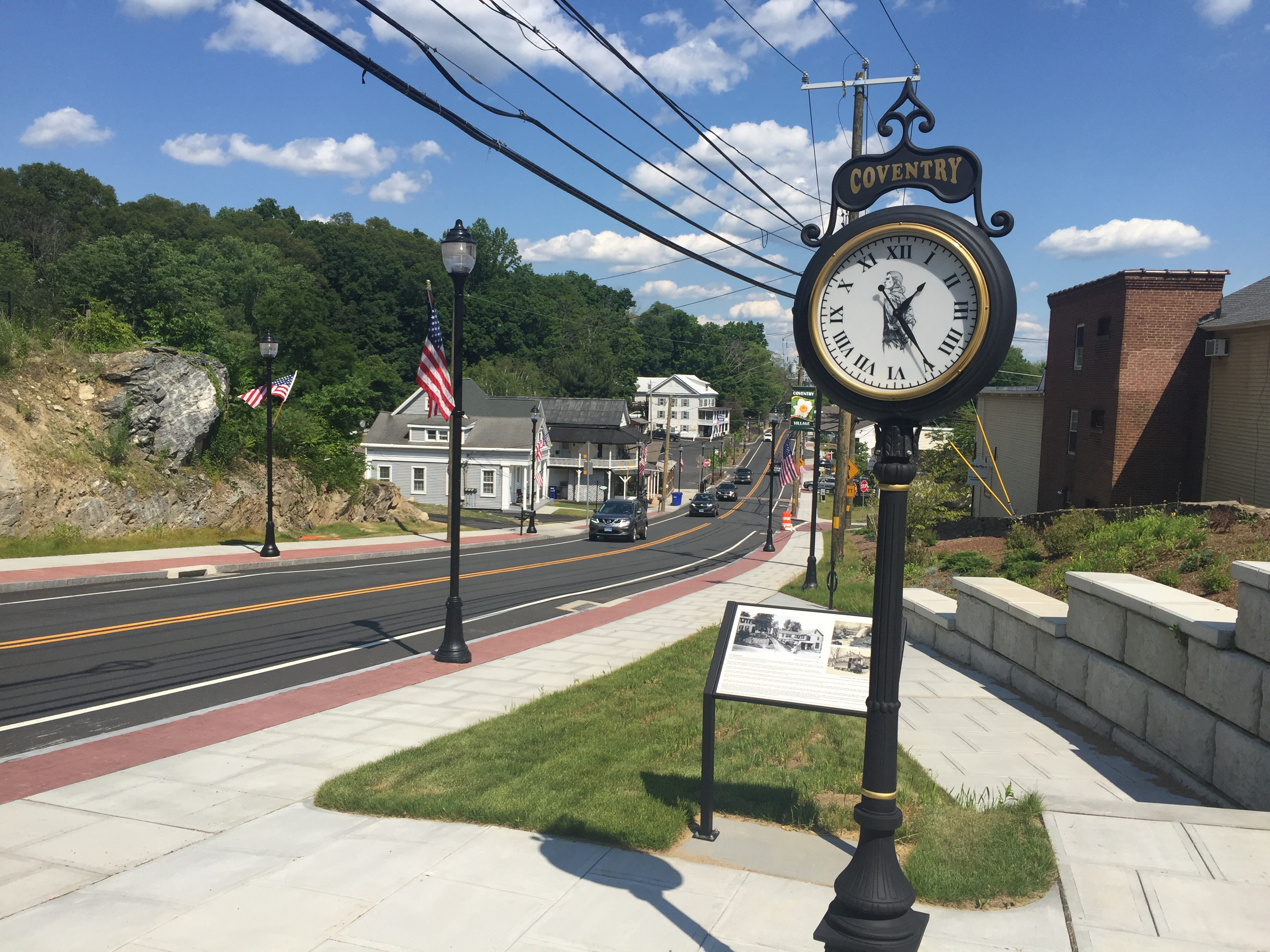
- The center of South Coventry, nearby Coventry Lake

- Flag Seal
- Interactive map of Coventry, Connecticut
- Coordinates: 41°47′04″N 72°20′20″W
- Country: United States
- U.S. state: Connecticut
- County: Tolland
- Region: Capitol Region
- Incorporated: 1712

Government
  - Type: Council-Manager
  - Town Manager: James Drumm
  - Town council: Lisa Thomas, Chair (D); Peter Larson. Vice-Chair (D); Matthew Kyer, Secretary (D); Jonathan B. Hand (D); Julie A. Blanchard (R); Robyn Gallagher (D); Mark Wheaton (R)

Area
  - Total: 38.4 sq mi (99.5 km^{2})
  - Land: 37.7 sq mi (97.7 km^{2})
  - Water: 0.66 sq mi (1.7 km^{2})
- Elevation: 660 ft (200 m)

Population (2020)
  - Total: 12,235
  - Density: 324/sq mi (125.2/km^{2})
- Time zone: UTC−5 (EST)
  - Summer (DST): UTC−4 (EDT)
- ZIP Code: 06238
- Area codes: 860/959
- FIPS code: 09-17800
- GNIS feature ID: 0213413
- Website: www.coventry-ct.gov

Coventry (/ˈkɑːvəntri/ KAH-vən-tree) is a town in Tolland County and in the Capitol Planning Region, Connecticut, United States. The population was 12,235 at the 2020 census. The birthplace of Captain Nathan Hale, Coventry is home to the Nathan Hale Homestead, which is now a museum open to the public.

== History ==
Coventry was named in October 1711, the first town in the colonies to be named "Coventry" for Coventry in the West Midlands, United Kingdom.

=== Settlement and founding ===
The Middle Post Road, one of the three Boston Post Roads declared in 1671 with the creation of the Colonial post, ran through Coventry. The Post Roads were meant to connect the colony of New York, formerly New Amsterdam, with the Massachusetts Bay Colony. Middle Post Road connected Hartford and Boston, Massachusetts via Coventry and Pomfret, Connecticut, and Mendon and Roxbury, Massachusetts. Chapter 1 DOT History

The first house in Coventry was said to have been built near the shore of Wangumbaug Lake by Nathaniel Rust, a Hartford, Connecticut man, originally from Northampton, Massachusetts. The entire Rust family is said to have made their final move to Coventry from Massachusetts in a group of a dozen families in 1709. Along with Nathaniel Rust, the names of some of the earliest settlers were David Lee, Thomas Root, Samuel Gurley, Ebenezer Searl, Joseph Petty, Benjamin James and Benjamin Carpenter. Four other settlers were also from Northampton and two from Reading.

The land was said to have originally been given to men from Hartford by Joshua, Indian sachem. The Connecticut General Assembly, held in Hartford in 1706, appointed William Pitkin, Joseph Tallcot, William Whiting and Richard Lord, as a committee with full power to lay out the bounds of the town and divisions of the land, to admit inhabitants. A 1711 revision added Nathaniel Rust to the committee and the task of procuring a minister of the gospel. Coventry was formally formed as a town in Hartford County in 1712. The first church was established in October 1714.

Coventry became a town in Windham County on May 12, 1726, then became a town in Tolland County when it was originally formed on October 13, 1785.

St. Mary's Church is a Roman Catholic church in Coventry. The church is part of the Diocese of Norwich, located at 1600 Main Street in town.

=== To the present ===
The old center of the town is in South Coventry, near the intersection of Main Street (Route 31) and Stonehouse Road (Route 275). In the 19th century, there was a small industrial center including mills powered by the water from Coventry Lake Brook as it flowed towards the Willimantic River. South Coventry Village, listed on the National Register of Historic Places, also includes several Victorian houses, a museum, the main branch of the public library and the Bidwell Tavern, a bar/restaurant established in 1822. The Bidwell used to keep Coventry's town records in the "vault" area behind the bar, as well as hosting town meetings. A few doors away is the W.L. Wellwood General Store, which under new ownership has been renamed "Coventry Country Store". The general store was originally built in 1787 making it the oldest General Store in America (a past owner claimed to have not found an older store). In all, the area has over 100 historical buildings on the national register.

North Coventry's settlement is less dense, and its housing and businesses are of more recent construction. In the 18th century, this section of the town was largely used for dairy and vegetable farming. As the United States expanded westward, multiple farming families left the rocky fields of Connecticut for the more fertile land of the Ohio River valley. Most of the farms in North Coventry were abandoned, and the land reclaimed by second-growth forest. In the 1960s and 1970s, tract housing developments were built on some of this land, mainly raised ranch or split-level houses on one acre (4,000 m^{2}) lots. Development slowed from the mid-1970s through the 1990s, but several new developments were constructed in North Coventry after 1990. These tend to feature larger houses on two acre (8,000 m^{2}) lots. Coventry was incorporated in May 1712.

== Geography ==
According to the United States Census Bureau, the town has a total area of 38.4 square miles (99 km^{2}) of which 37.7 square miles (98 km^{2}) is land and 0.6 square miles (1.6 km^{2}) (1.67%) is water.

=== Climate ===
This climatic region is typified by large seasonal temperature differences, with warm to hot (and often humid) summers and cold (sometimes severely cold) winters. According to the Köppen Climate Classification system, Coventry has a humid continental climate, abbreviated "Dfb" on climate maps.

=== Principal communities ===
- North Coventry
- South Coventry
- Coventry Lake

== Demographics ==
Historical population
Census	Pop.	Note	%±
1790	2,130		—
1800	2,021		−5.1%
1810	1,938		−4.1%
1820	2,058		6.2%
1850	1,984		—
1860	2,085		5.1%
1870	2,657		27.4%
1880	2,043		−23.1%
1890	1,875		−8.2%
1900	1,632		−13.0%
1910	1,606		−1.6%
1920	1,582		−1.5%
1930	1,554		−1.8%
1940	2,102		35.3%
1950	4,043		92.3%
1960	6,356		57.2%
1970	8,140		28.1%
1980	8,895		9.3%
1990	10,063		13.1%
2000	11,504		14.3%
2010	12,435		8.1%
2020	12,235		−1.6%
U.S. Decennial Census

At the 2010 census, there were 12,435 people, 4,783 households and 3,426 families residing in the town. The population density was 330.0 inhabitants per square mile (127.4/km^{2}). There were 4,783 occupied housing units. 316 vacant housing units. The racial makeup of the town was 94.00% White, 0.90% African American, 0.20% Native American, 0.80% Asian, 0.00% Pacific Islander, 0.20% from other races, and 1.40% from two or more races. Hispanic or Latino of any race were 2.60% of the population.

There were 4,783 households which 31.1% had children under the age of 18 living with them, 59.5% were married couples living together, 7.7% had a female householder with no husband present, and 28.4% were non-families. Of all households, 20.9% were made up of individuals, and 6.6% had someone living alone who was 65 years of age or older. The average household size was 2.59 and the average family size was 3.01.

23.3% of the population were under the age of 18, 12.1% from 15 to 24, 25.0% from 25 to 44, 33.2% from 45 to 64, and 10.6% who were 65 years of age or older. The median age was 41.5 years. 50.6% of the population were male and 49.4% were female. 38.4% of the males were over the age of 18. 38.2% of the females were over the age of 18. For every 100 females, there were 102.2 males. For every 100 females age 18 and over, there were 100.8 males.

The median household income was $86,244, and the median family income was $91,931. Males had a median income of $65,572 versus $53,690 for females. The per capita income for the town was $34,524 About 2.4% of families and 3.1% of the population were below the poverty line, including 2.9% of those under age 18 and 1.1% of those age 65 or over.

== Politics ==
In the United States House of Representatives, Coventry belongs to Connecticut's 2nd congressional district, represented by Joe Courtney.

In the Connecticut State Senate, Coventry belongs to the 35th Senate district, represented by Ethan Werstler. In the Connecticut General Assembly, it belongs to the 8th Assembly district, represented by Francis Lombard.

Voter Registration and Party Enrollment as of October 29, 2019
Party	Active voters	Inactive voters	Total voters	Percentage
Democratic	2,520	79	2,599	28.57%
Republican	2,084	63	2,147	23.60%
Unaffiliated	4,050	158	4,208	46.26%
Minor parties	138	4	142	1.56%
Total	8,792	304	9,096	100%

Presidential Election Results
Year	Democratic	Republican	Third Parties
2024	50.0% 3,808	48.3 3,681	1.7% 131
2020	51.6% 4,011	45.6% 3,545	2.8% 216
2016	45.5% 3,083	48.2% 3,262	6.3% 426
2012	56.3% 3,358	41.7% 2,621	2.0% 126
2008	58.7% 3,888	39.6% 2,621	1.7% 111
2004	56.3% 3,588	41.5% 2,641	2.2% 141
2000	55.5% 3,005	35.6% 1,927	8.9% 481
1996	50.4% 2,591	30.4% 1,564	19.2% 989
1992	42.7% 2,393	26.2% 1,465	31.1% 1,743
1988	51.9% 2,341	46.8% 2,111	1.3% 58
1984	38.7% 1,682	60.7% 2,637	0.6% 24
1980	37.1% 1,520	40.8% 1,671	22.1% 901
1976	50.9% 1,955	48.4% 1,859	0.7% 25
1972	42.1% 1,680	56.8% 2,267	1.1% 46
1968	48.1% 1,546	45.3% 1,455	6.6% 214
1964	68.8% 2,033	31.2% 923	0.00% 0
1960	46.6% 1,409	53.4% 1,613	0.00% 0
1956	32.6% 881	67.4% 1,821	0.00% 0

== Places of interest ==
- Wangumbaug Lake, also known as Coventry Lake, covers 373 acres (1.51 km^{2}). The lake is fed by springs, and has one natural outlet, known as Coventry Lake Brook. The brook flows towards South Coventry center and ultimately into the Willimantic River. Patriots Park, located on Wangumbaug Lake, contains a guarded beach, playground, picnic area, lodge facilities, Community Center, and band shell for summer concerts. It is also home of the Coventry Lake Water Ski Team, Coventry Lake Community Rowing (CLCR), Coventry High School Rowing, E.O. Smith HS Rowing, UConn Men and Women's Crew Teams and UConn Sailing Club. The boat launch is run by the State of Connecticut. Occasionally, during the winter months, the lake will freeze over and residents have the opportunity to skate or fish on the ice. A lake island, Underwood Island, is located 100 yards from the coast of the lake.
- Nathan Hale Homestead, first established around 1740 by Deacon Richard Hale (1717–1802), the present structure has been standing since 1776 and was built to house the combined family of Deacon Hale and his second wife Abigail (Cobb) Adams. The original house, birthplace of Nathan Hale in 1755, is said to have been on the property, just southeast of the 1776 house. The original 450 acres (1.8 km^{2}) of the Hale farm now make up a large portion of the Nathan Hale State Forest. Today the Hale family home, located on South Street, is a museum open seasonally for tours and education programs. It is also home to a Farmer's market, with food trucks and local small businesses. It is run on Sundays in the summer months of the year.
- The Strong-Porter House Museum, c. 1730, is listed on the National Register of Historic Places and serves as the Coventry Historical Society's museum. Five rooms of the house, as well as several outbuildings, including a carpenter shop, carriage sheds, and barn are open to the public.
- The Brick School House, second construction completed in 1825 after original burned, it is one of the four remaining district schoolhouses in Coventry and was used through 1953.
- Caprilands Herb Farm, c. 1740 colonial farmstead, home for over 65 years to the late herbalist and author, Adelma Grenier Simmons.
- Hytone Farm, owned and operated by the Peracchio family since the early 1940s and a fully operational dairy farm since 1960, they raise all their own Holstein cows, currently have 165 young stock and use over 350 acres (1.4 km^{2}) of corn and grass for silage. Hytone Farm has received multiple Distinguished Farming awards through their years.
- Museum of Connecticut Glass is a new museum focusing on glassmaking in the state.

=== On the National Register of Historic Places ===
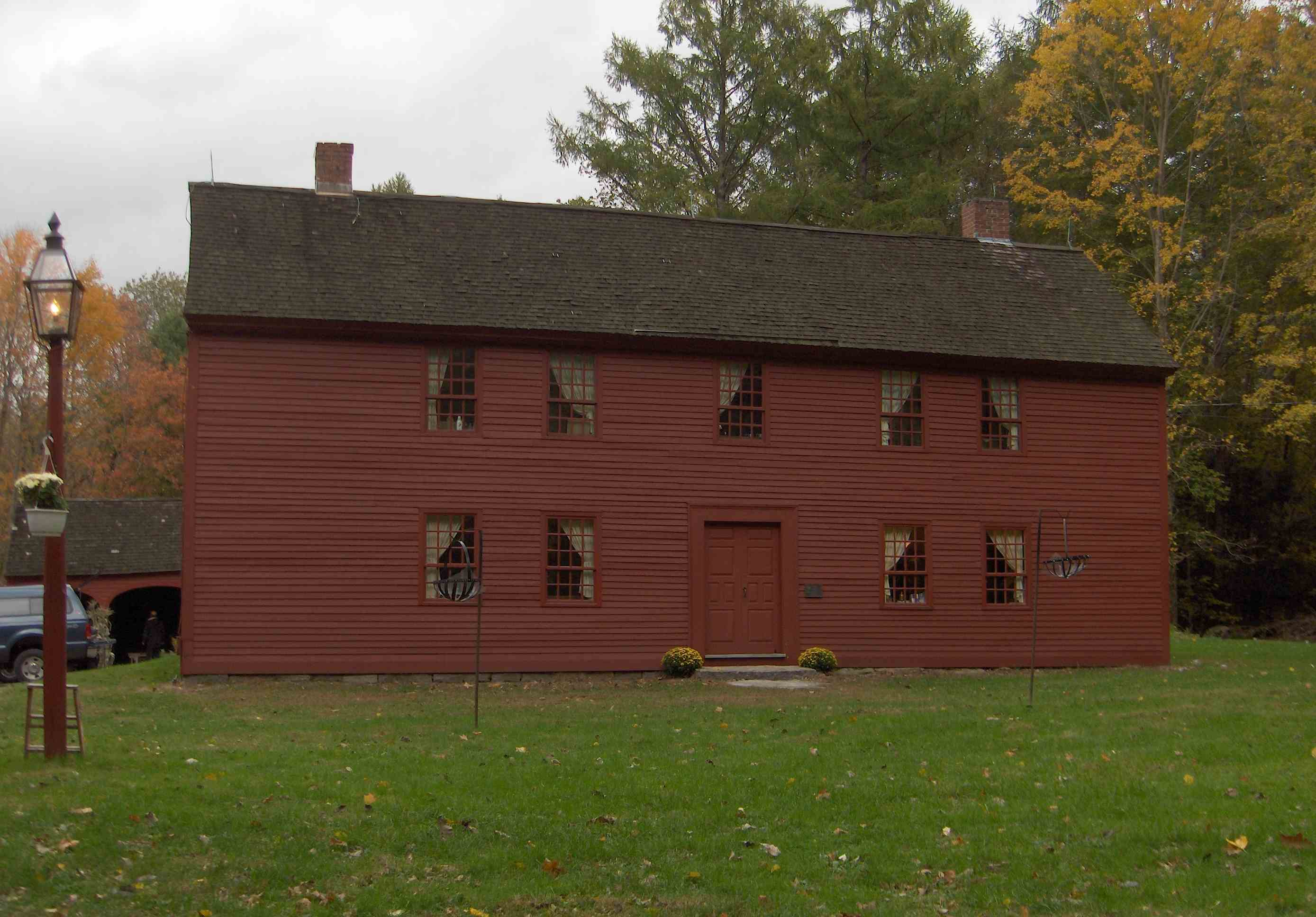
Strong-Porter House

- Brigham's Tavern – 12 Boston Turnpike (added April 25, 1982)
- Capron-Phillips House – 1129 Main Street (added May 27, 1982)
- Captain Nathan Hale Monument – 120 Lake Street (added February 28, 2002)
- Coventry Glass Factory Historic District – US 44 and North River Road (added September 27, 1987)
- Elias Sprague House – 2187 South Street (added December 2, 1987)
- Loomis-Pomeroy House – 1747 Boston Turnpike (added May 26, 1994)
- Nathan Hale Homestead – 229 South Street (added November 22, 1970)
- Parker-Hutchinson Farm – Parker Bridge Road (added May 29, 1982)
- South Coventry Historic District – Roughly, Main Street and adjacent streets from Armstrong Road to Lake Street and Lake from High Street to Main (added June 6, 1991)
- Strong-Porter House – 2382 South Street (added February 15, 1988)

== Annual events ==
Memorial Day-Memorial Day Parade – Capt. Nathan Hale is recognized along with members of the Armed Forces.

- CoventryFest: With fireworks, food and live music. Held in early July at Patriot's Park on the lake.
- June 6: Captain Hale's Birthday Party—held at the Hale Homestead
- July: Colonial Encampment and Muster—held by the Nathan Hale Ancient Fife & Drums at the Hale Homestead.
- December: "Old-Fashioned Christmas in Coventry". Main Street first Saturday in December.

== Education ==
- Coventry Grammar School, K – Grade 2
- G. H. Robertson Intermediate School, Grades 3–5
- Capt. Nathan Hale Middle School, Grades 6–8
- Coventry High School, Grades 9–12
- Coventry Academy, Grades 8–12

== Notable people ==
- George N. Barnard (1819–1902), photographer who joined Mathew Brady in recording the American Civil War
- Lorenzo Dow (1777–1834), figure in the Second Great Awakening
- Elisha W. Edgerton (1815–1904), businessman and member of the Wisconsin State Assembly
- Nathan Hale (1755–1776), captain in the Continental Army during the American Revolutionary War and official State Hero of Connecticut, was born in town. Empty grave in Nathan Hale Cemetery
- David Hayes (1931–2013), artist, American Modern Master of painted steel sculptures
- Benoni Irwin (1840–1896), American portrait painter and summer resident; drowned in Coventry Lake
- Mark Putnam, the first FBI agent to be convicted of murder, in the Susan Smith murder case.
- Jesse Root (1736–1822), resident who served in the Continental Congress representing Connecticut from 1778 until 1782 and sat as chief justice of the Connecticut Supreme Court from 1796 to 1807
- Adelma Grenier Simmons (1903–1997), author and one of the leading herbal figures in America in the 20th century

== Sister cities ==
- Coventry, New York
- Coventry, Rhode Island
- Coventry, Vermont

=== Twin town ===
Coventry is twinned with Coventry in the United Kingdom.
