= Hale High School =

Hale High School may refer to:

- Hale High School (Michigan), United States
- Hale High School (Missouri), United States
- Hale Center High School, Texas, United States
- Hale County High School, Alabama, United States
- Hale O Ulu School, Hawaii, United States
- St. David's School (Raleigh, North Carolina), United States (formerly known as Hale High School)

== See also ==
- Nathan Hale High School (disambiguation)
