= Underwood Island =

Lake island in Connecticut

Underwood Island is a small lake island in Wangumbaug Lake in Coventry, Connecticut. It is about two acres in size, and is privately owned. The island has a pond on it, and was named for both its condition and the legend that it was visited by the owner of Underwood Typewriter Co. and his wife. It is 100 yards from the coast of the lake. Strangely, it is claimed to be the only island on the lake, despite there being a larger, unnamed island at 41°46′13.7″N 72°18′59.5″W, and a small islet nearby.
