= South Coventry (CDP), Connecticut =

Census-designated place in Connecticut, United States

South Coventry, Connecticut
- CDP
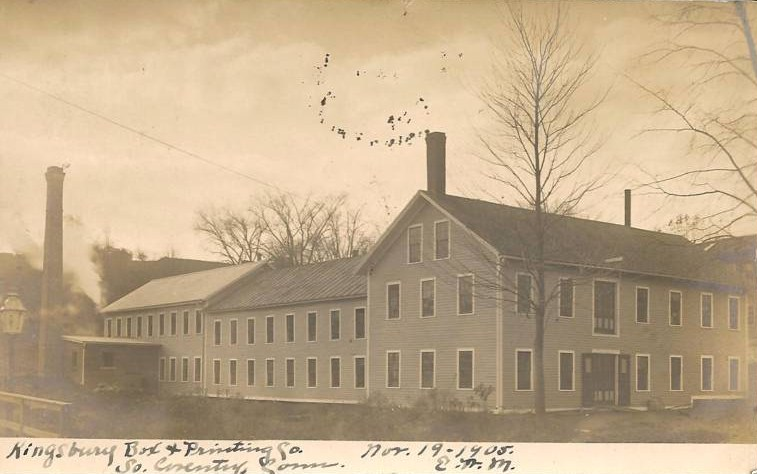
- Kingsbury Box and Printing, 1905

- Location in Tolland County and the state of Connecticut
- Coordinates: 41°46′12″N 72°18′18″W
- Country: United States
- State: Connecticut
- County: Tolland

Area
  - Total: 3.2 sq mi (8.3 km^{2})
  - Land: 3.2 sq mi (8.3 km^{2})
  - Water: 0 sq mi (0.0 km^{2})
- Elevation: 520 ft (160 m)

Population (2010)
  - Total: 1,483
  - Density: 430/sq mi (166.1/km^{2})
- Time zone: UTC-5 (Eastern (EST))
  - Summer (DST): UTC-4 (EDT)
- FIPS code: 09-69990
- GNIS feature ID: 1867101

South Coventry is a census-designated place and part of the town of Coventry, Connecticut, United States. The population was 1,483 at the 2010 census.

== Geography ==
According to the United States Census Bureau, the CDP has a total area of 8.3 km^{2} (3.2 mi^{2}), of which 8.3 km^{2} (3.2 mi^{2}) is land and 0.31% is water.

== Demographics ==
As of the census of 2000, there were 1,381 people, 555 households, and 341 families residing in the CDP. The population density was 166.1/km^{2} (430.2/mi^{2}). There were 576 housing units at an average density of 69.3/km^{2} (179.4/mi^{2}). The racial makeup of the CDP was 98.26% White, 0.22% African American, 0.58% Native American, 0.14% Asian, 0.36% from other races, and 0.43% from two or more races. Hispanic or Latino of any race were 1.81% of the population.

There were 555 households, out of which 33.9% had children under the age of 18 living with them, 50.3% were married couples living together, 8.1% had a female householder with no husband present, and 38.4% were non-families. 29.7% of all households were made up of individuals, and 13.0% had someone living alone who was 65 years of age or older. The average household size was 2.49 and the average family size was 3.17.

In the CDP, the population was spread out, with 26.8% under the age of 18, 6.4% from 18 to 24, 33.3% from 25 to 44, 22.2% from 45 to 64, and 11.4% who were 65 years of age or older. The median age was 37 years. For every 100 females, there were 99.9 males. For every 100 females age 18 and over, there were 95.6 males.

The median income for a household in the CDP was $44,063, and the median income for a family was $66,853. Males had a median income of $45,000 versus $34,018 for females. The per capita income for the CDP was $26,817. About 5.6% of families and 8.0% of the population were below the poverty line, including 5.5% of those under age 18 and 11.1% of those age 65 or over.

== Notable person ==
- Elisha W. Edgerton, Wisconsin businessman and politician
