= Oliver Frazer =

American painter

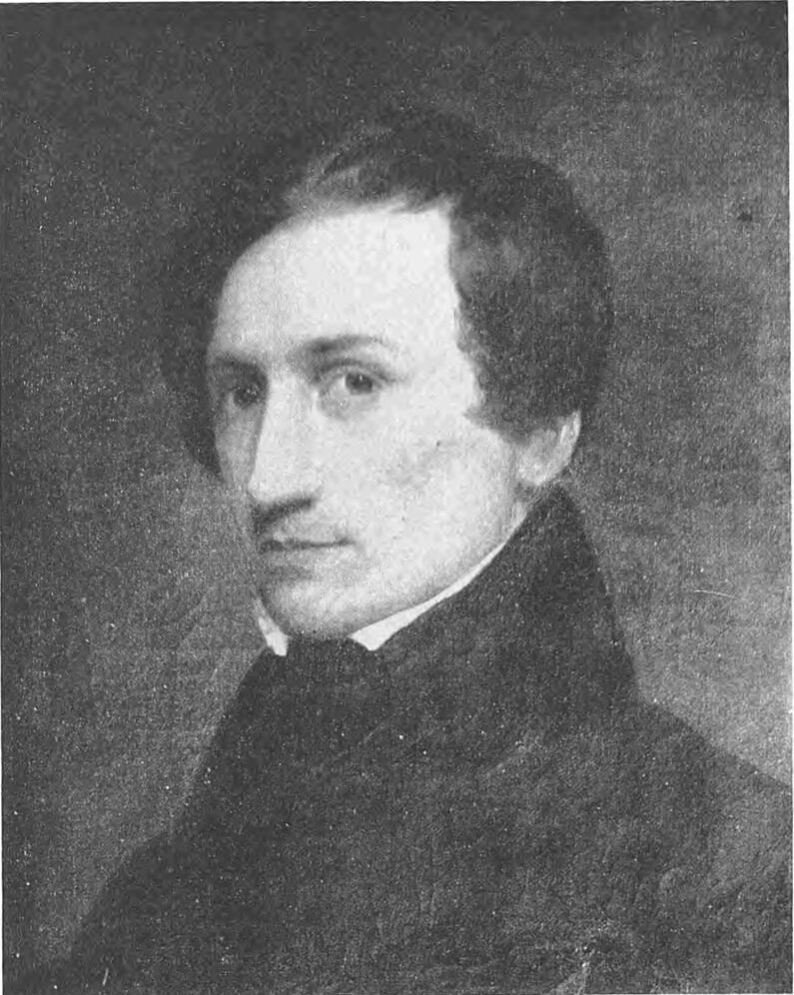
- portrait by James de Veaux, 1837
- Born: 1808
- Died: April 9, 1864 (aged 55–56)
- Occupation: Painter

Oliver Frazer (1808 – April 9, 1864) was an American portrait painter. He was trained by Matthew Harris Jouett before going to Europe, and he became a portrait painter in his home state of Kentucky. He did portraits of many Kentuckians such as James G. Birney, Edward Morton Le Grand, William Robertson McKee, and Richard Menefee. His portrait of Henry Clay is in the permanent collection of the Metropolitan Museum of Art. His papers are held at the University of Kentucky Libraries Special Collections Research Center.
