= South Coventry Historic District =

Historic district in Connecticut, United States

- U.S. National Register of Historic Places
- U.S. Historic district
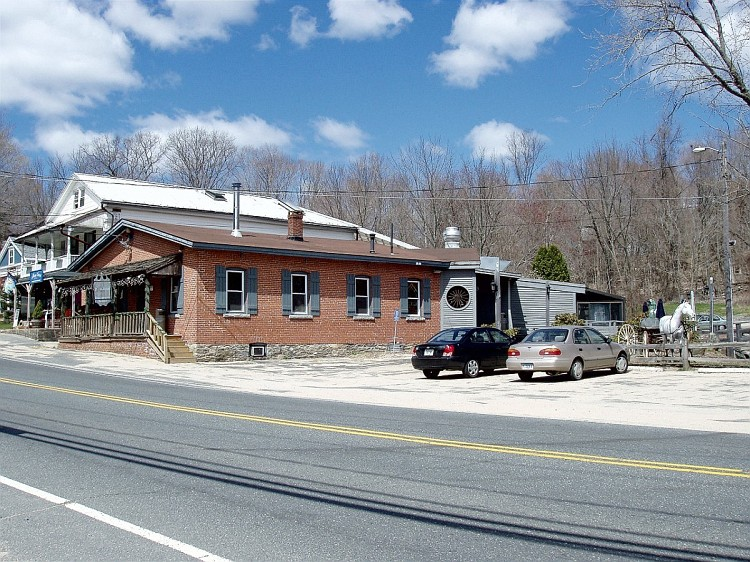
- Bidwell Tavern

- Location within Connecticut Location within the United States
- Location: Roughly, Main Street and adjacent Streets from Armstrong Road to Lake Street and Lake from High Street to Main, Coventry, Connecticut
- Coordinates: 41°46′12″N 72°18′17″W
- Area: 250 acres (100 ha)
- Architectural style: Greek Revival, Late Victorian, Colonial
- NRHP reference No.: 91000482
- Added to NRHP: May 6, 1991

The South Coventry Historic District is a historic district encompassing the historic village center of South Coventry in the town of Coventry, Connecticut. The village, settled in the early 18th century, has served as Coventry's civic center, and also served as an economic center, with textile mills operating in the 19th century. The district was listed on the National Register of Historic Places in 1991.

== Description and history ==
South Coventry was settled beginning in 1707, and Coventry was incorporated in 1712. During the 18th century, the area was agricultural, with a grist mill on nearby Mill Brook. The village green was laid at Lake and High Streets by 1730, and served as a militia training and muster ground for the French and Indian War and the American Revolutionary War. In the 19th century, there was a small industrial center including mills powered by the water from Coventry Lake Brook as it flowed towards the Willimantic River. South Coventry also includes several Victorian houses, a museum, the main branch of the public library, and the Bidwell Tavern, a bar/restaurant established in 1822. A few doors down is the W.L Wellwood General Store, under new ownership, has been renamed "Coventry Arts and Antiques". The general store was originally built in 1787 making it one of, if not the oldest general store in the United States (a past owner claimed to have not found an older store).

The historic district extends mainly along Main Street (Connecticut Route 31), between Stonehouse and Armstrong Roads, roughly paralleling Mill Brook to the south. It also extends southward along Lake Street to High Street, and along Wall and Prospect Streets, which run south of Mill Brook. It covers about 250 acres (100 ha), and includes more than 200 contributing elements. In addition to the surviving buildings, there are remnants of industrial activity along the brook, and the Captain Nathan Hale Monument, the nation's first major monument to the American Revolutionary War, placed in honor of Coventry's native son, Nathan Hale, and Patriots Park, a lakefront park that was a former Salvation Army summer camp.

== See also ==
- South Coventry CDP
- National Register of Historic Places listings in Tolland County, Connecticut
