= Coventry Lake, Connecticut =

Census-designated place in Connecticut, United States

- Census-designated place
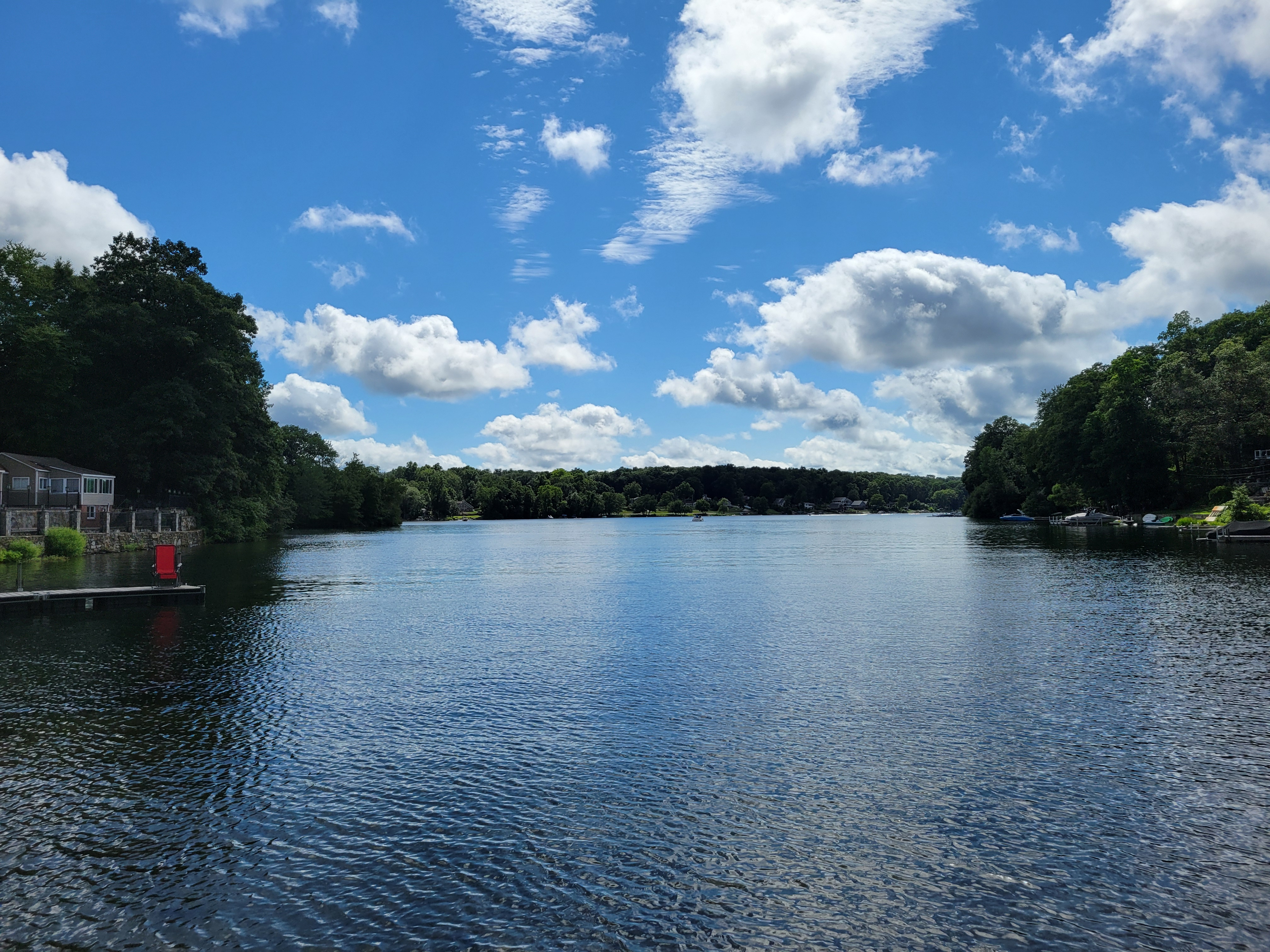
- Wangumbaug Lake - also known as Coventry Lake

- Location in Tolland County and the state of Connecticut
- Coordinates: 41°46′20″N 72°19′57″W
- Country: United States
- State: Connecticut
- County: Tolland
- Town: Coventry

Area
  - Total: 3.5 sq mi (9.1 km^{2})
  - Land: 2.9 sq mi (7.6 km^{2})
  - Water: 0.58 sq mi (1.5 km^{2})
- Elevation: 515 ft (157 m)

Population (2010)
  - Total: 2,990
  - Density: 1,000/sq mi (390/km^{2})
- Time zone: UTC-5 (Eastern (EST))
  - Summer (DST): UTC-4 (EDT)
- ZIP code: 06238
- Area code: 860
- FIPS code: 09-17835
- GNIS feature ID: 2377811

Coventry Lake is a village and census-designated place in the town of Coventry in Tolland County, United States. As of the 2020 census, Coventry Lake had a population of 2,823. The CDP includes the residential areas around Wangumbaug Lake.

== Geography ==
According to the United States Census Bureau, the CDP has a total area of 9.1 km^{2} (3.5 mi^{2}), of which 7.6 km^{2} (2.9 mi^{2}) is land and 1.5 km^{2} (0.6 mi^{2}) (16.76%) is water.

== Demographics ==
=== 2020 census ===
As of the 2020 census, Coventry Lake had a population of 2,823. The median age was 44.8 years. 16.8% of residents were under the age of 18 and 17.2% of residents were 65 years of age or older. For every 100 females there were 95.1 males, and for every 100 females age 18 and over there were 95.8 males age 18 and over.

0.0% of residents lived in urban areas, while 100.0% lived in rural areas.

There were 1,266 households in Coventry Lake, of which 25.0% had children under the age of 18 living in them. Of all households, 47.4% were married-couple households, 19.0% were households with a male householder and no spouse or partner present, and 25.0% were households with a female householder and no spouse or partner present. About 27.8% of all households were made up of individuals and 10.3% had someone living alone who was 65 years of age or older.

There were 1,446 housing units, of which 12.4% were vacant. The homeowner vacancy rate was 0.5% and the rental vacancy rate was 2.1%.

Racial composition as of the 2020 census
Race	Number	Percent
White	2,534	89.8%
Black or African American	30	1.1%
American Indian and Alaska Native	1	0.0%
Asian	37	1.3%
Native Hawaiian and Other Pacific Islander	0	0.0%
Some other race	55	1.9%
Two or more races	166	5.9%
Hispanic or Latino (of any race)	127	4.5%

=== 2000 census ===
As of the 2000 census, there were 2,914 people, 1,125 households, and 774 families residing in the CDP. The population density was 384.0/km^{2} (994.1/mi^{2}). There were 1,272 housing units at an average density of 167.6/km^{2} (433.9/mi^{2}). The racial makeup of the CDP was 96.64% White, 0.58% African American, 0.27% Native American, 0.58% Asian, 0.03% Pacific Islander, 0.69% from other races, and 1.20% from two or more races. Hispanic or Latino of any race were 1.65% of the population.

There were 1,125 households, out of which 33.6% had children under the age of 18 living with them, 54.4% were married couples living together, 8.5% had a female householder with no husband present, and 31.2% were non-families. 22.0% of all households were made up of individuals, and 5.8% had someone living alone who was 65 years of age or older. The average household size was 2.59 and the average family size was 3.05.

In the CDP, the population was spread out, with 26.3% under the age of 18, 7.6% from 18 to 24, 34.1% from 25 to 44, 23.2% from 45 to 64, and 8.8% who were 65 years of age or older. The median age was 36 years. For every 100 females, there were 104.6 males. For every 100 females age 18 and over, there were 102.6 males.

The median income for a household in the CDP was $54,233, and the median income for a family was $71,771. Males had a median income of $45,938 versus $36,204 for females. The per capita income for the CDP was $26,968. About 3.4% of families and 5.3% of the population were below the poverty line, including 4.7% of those under age 18 and 4.5% of those age 65 or over.
