= Andrew F. Bunner =

American painter and draughtsman

Andrew Fisher Bunner
- Born: 1841; New York City, U.S.
- Died: 1897 (aged 55–56); Manhattan, New York City, U.S.
- Occupations: Painter, draughtsman

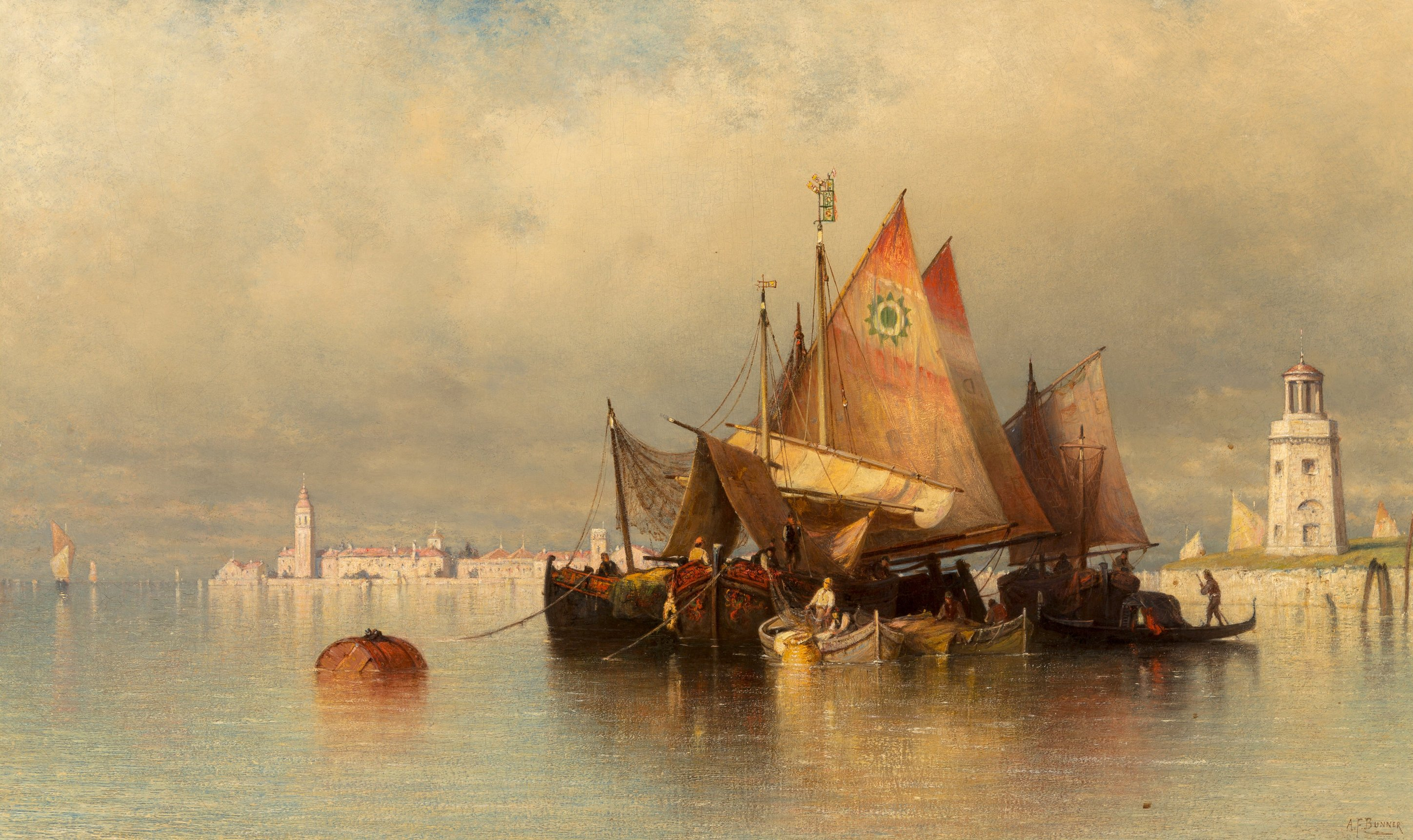
Looking Off from Venice towards San Lazzaro by Andrew Fisher Bunner.

Andrew F. Bunner (1841 – 1897) was an American painter and draughtsman. He lived in New York City, and he specialized in marine and landscape watercolors. His work is in the permanent collections of the Metropolitan Museum of Art and the National Gallery of Art.
