= Statue of Nathan Hale =

Statue of Nathan Hale may refer to:

- Statue of Nathan Hale (Chicago)
- Statue of Nathan Hale (New York City)
- Statue of Nathan Hale (Washington, D.C.)
