= Windham, Connecticut =

- Town
- Town of Windham
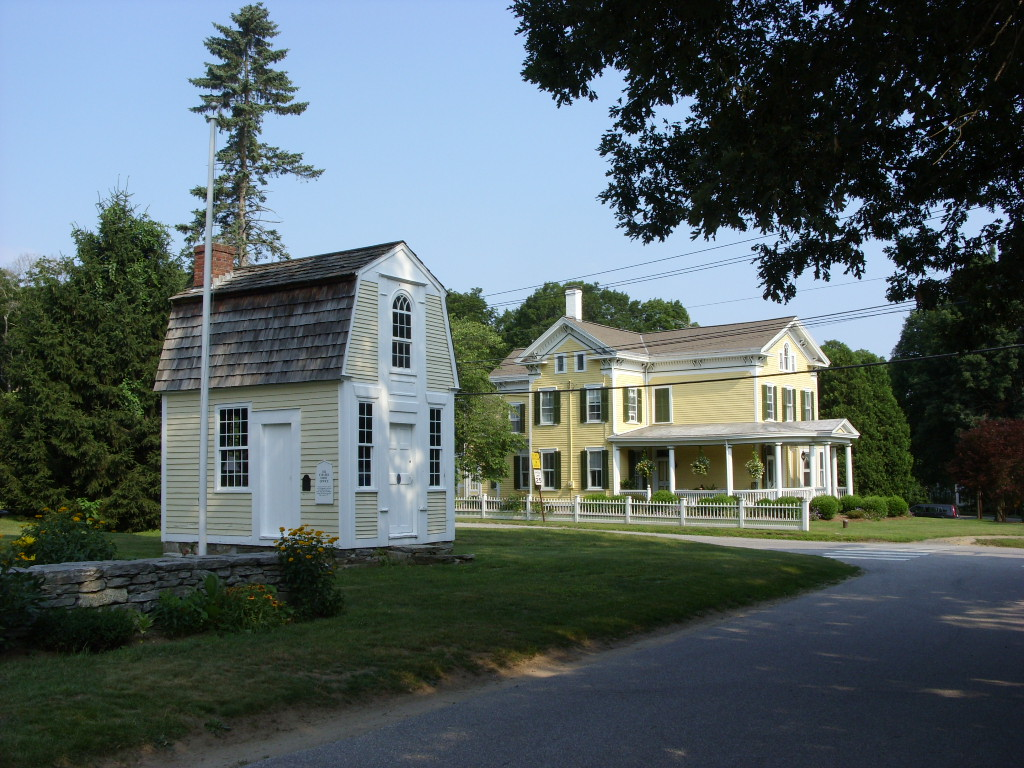
- Dr. Chester Hunt Office in Windham Center

- Seal

- Coordinates: 41°43′N 72°10′W
- Country: United States
- U.S. state: Connecticut
- County: Windham
- Region: Southeastern CT
- Incorporated: 1693

Government
  - Mayor: Tom Devivo
  - Town Manager: James Rivers

Area
  - Total: 27.9 sq mi (72.3 km^{2})
  - Land: 27.1 sq mi (70.1 km^{2})
  - Water: 0.85 sq mi (2.2 km^{2})
- Elevation: 233 ft (71 m)

Population (2020)
  - Total: 24,428
  - Density: 903/sq mi (348.5/km^{2})
- Time zone: UTC-5 (Eastern)
  - Summer (DST): UTC-4 (Eastern)
- ZIP Codes: 06226, 06235, 06256, 06266, 06280
- Area codes: 860/959
- FIPS code: 09-86790
- GNIS feature ID: 0213537
- Website: windhamct.gov

Windham (/ˈwɪndəm/ WIN-dəm) is a town in Windham County, Connecticut, United States. It contains the former city of Willimantic as well as the communities of Windham Center, North Windham, and South Windham. Willimantic, an incorporated city since 1893, was consolidated with the town in 1983. The town is part of the Southeastern Connecticut Planning Region. The population was 24,428 at the 2020 census.

== History ==
Prior to the arrival of Europeans, the region was occupied by Algonquian peoples, including the Pequot, Mohegan, Narragansett, and Nipmuck. After the conclusion of the Pequot War in 1638, the Pequots ceased to exist as a tribe; after King Philip's War ended in 1678, the Narragansett and Nipmuck did as well, leaving the Mohegans the only native power in the region. The settlement of Windham was left to settlers by Joshua Uncas, son of Uncas, in a will dated 1675. Settlers moved in, and held their first town meeting on May 18, 1691. The tract was named the town of Windham in May 1692, and was incorporated into Hartford County in fall of 1693.

Starting in the early nineteenth century, the town's center of activity moved from Windham to Willimantic, as the water power available there led to the establishment of factories. First established as a borough in 1833, it was incorporated as a separate city in 1893, then reincorporated into the town of Windham in 1983 as its industry declined.

== Geography ==
According to the United States Census Bureau, the town has a total area of 27.9 square miles (72.3 km^{2}), of which 27.1 square miles (70.1 km^{2}) is land and 0.9 square mile (2.2 km^{2}) (3.04%) is water.

=== Climate ===
Climate data for Windham County, Connecticut (including University of Connecticut and Storrs, Connecticut), 1991–2020 normals, extremes 1888–present
| Month | Jan | Feb | Mar | Apr | May | Jun | Jul | Aug | Sep | Oct | Nov | Dec | Year |
|---|---|---|---|---|---|---|---|---|---|---|---|---|---|
| Record high °F (°C) | 68 (20) | 69 (21) | 83 (28) | 95 (35) | 93 (34) | 96 (36) | 101 (38) | 97 (36) | 97 (36) | 89 (32) | 82 (28) | 73 (23) | 101 (38) |
| Mean maximum °F (°C) | 56.4 (13.6) | 55.2 (12.9) | 64.1 (17.8) | 77.7 (25.4) | 84.1 (28.9) | 87.3 (30.7) | 89.8 (32.1) | 87.8 (31.0) | 84.0 (28.9) | 76.1 (24.5) | 68.2 (20.1) | 59.8 (15.4) | 91.6 (33.1) |
| Mean daily maximum °F (°C) | 35.0 (1.7) | 37.2 (2.9) | 44.8 (7.1) | 57.0 (13.9) | 67.6 (19.8) | 75.6 (24.2) | 80.5 (26.9) | 79.1 (26.2) | 72.7 (22.6) | 61.3 (16.3) | 50.3 (10.2) | 40.1 (4.5) | 58.4 (14.7) |
| Daily mean °F (°C) | 26.9 (−2.8) | 28.8 (−1.8) | 36.3 (2.4) | 47.5 (8.6) | 57.7 (14.3) | 66.3 (19.1) | 71.7 (22.1) | 70.0 (21.1) | 63.4 (17.4) | 52.1 (11.2) | 42.1 (5.6) | 32.7 (0.4) | 49.6 (9.8) |
| Mean daily minimum °F (°C) | 18.8 (−7.3) | 20.4 (−6.4) | 27.8 (−2.3) | 38.0 (3.3) | 47.7 (8.7) | 57.0 (13.9) | 62.8 (17.1) | 60.9 (16.1) | 54.1 (12.3) | 42.9 (6.1) | 34.0 (1.1) | 25.3 (−3.7) | 40.8 (4.9) |
| Mean minimum °F (°C) | −0.2 (−17.9) | 3.2 (−16.0) | 11.1 (−11.6) | 26.6 (−3.0) | 36.4 (2.4) | 44.9 (7.2) | 53.3 (11.8) | 51.2 (10.7) | 40.3 (4.6) | 29.7 (−1.3) | 20.0 (−6.7) | 9.9 (−12.3) | −2.1 (−18.9) |
| Record low °F (°C) | −19 (−28) | −20 (−29) | −6 (−21) | 10 (−12) | 25 (−4) | 35 (2) | 42 (6) | 37 (3) | 26 (−3) | 16 (−9) | 1 (−17) | −17 (−27) | −20 (−29) |
| Average precipitation inches (mm) | 3.65 (93) | 2.99 (76) | 4.38 (111) | 4.23 (107) | 3.73 (95) | 4.52 (115) | 4.01 (102) | 4.30 (109) | 4.48 (114) | 4.58 (116) | 3.90 (99) | 4.50 (114) | 49.27 (1,251) |
| Average snowfall inches (cm) | 8.3 (21) | 14.1 (36) | 6.3 (16) | 1.7 (4.3) | 0.0 (0.0) | 0.0 (0.0) | 0.0 (0.0) | 0.0 (0.0) | 0.0 (0.0) | 0.3 (0.76) | 1.1 (2.8) | 7.2 (18) | 39.0 (99) |
| Average precipitation days (≥ 0.01 in) | 10.2 | 9.0 | 10.2 | 11.3 | 12.7 | 10.9 | 10.5 | 9.5 | 9.0 | 10.6 | 9.1 | 10.4 | 123.4 |
| Average snowy days (≥ 0.1 in) | 3.8 | 4.0 | 2.5 | 0.6 | 0.0 | 0.0 | 0.0 | 0.0 | 0.0 | 0.1 | 0.4 | 2.1 | 13.5 |
Source 1: NOAA
Source 2: National Weather Service

== Demographics ==
Historical population
| Census | Pop. | Note | %± |
|---|---|---|---|
| 1820 | 2,489 | | — |
| 1840 | 3,382 | | — |
| 1850 | 4,503 | | 33.1% |
| 1860 | 4,243 | | −5.8% |
| 1870 | 5,412 | | 27.6% |
| 1880 | 8,264 | | 52.7% |
| 1890 | 10,032 | | 21.4% |
| 1900 | 8,937 | | −10.9% |
| 1910 | 12,604 | | 41.0% |
| 1920 | 13,801 | | 9.5% |
| 1930 | 13,773 | | −0.2% |
| 1940 | 13,824 | | 0.4% |
| 1950 | 15,884 | | 14.9% |
| 1960 | 16,973 | | 6.9% |
| 1970 | 19,626 | | 15.6% |
| 1980 | 21,062 | | 7.3% |
| 1990 | 22,039 | | 4.6% |
| 2000 | 22,857 | | 3.7% |
| 2010 | 25,268 | | 10.5% |
| 2020 | 24,428 | | −3.3% |
U.S. Decennial Census

The old Windham High School building, located in Willimantic, Connecticut

As of the census of 2000, there were 22,857 people, 8,342 households, and 5,088 families residing in the town. The population density was 844.4 inhabitants per square mile (326.0/km^{2}). There were 8,926 housing units at an average density of 329.8 per square mile (127.3/km^{2}). The racial makeup of the town was 74.0% White, 5.1% African American, 0.6% Native American, 1.3% Asian, 0.1% Pacific Islander, 15.2% from other races, and 3.8% from two or more races. Hispanic or Latino of any race were 26.9% of the population.

There were 8,342 households, out of which 30.1% had children under the age of 18 living with them, 39.4% were married couples living together, 16.8% had a female householder with no husband present, and 39.0% were non-families. 29.8% of all households were made up of individuals, and 11.2% had someone living alone who was 65 years of age or older. The average household size was 2.47 and the average family size was 3.05.

In the town, the population was spread out, with 23.0% under the age of 18, 18.1% from 18 to 24, 27.2% from 25 to 44, 19.1% from 45 to 64, and 12.6% who were 65 years of age or older. The median age was 31 years. For every 100 females, there were 93.5 males. For every 100 females age 18 and over, there were 90.0 males.

The median income for a household in the town was $35,087, and the median income for a family was $42,023. Males had a median income of $32,742 versus $25,703 for females. The per capita income for the town was $16,978. About 12.7% of families and 17.5% of the population were below the poverty line, including 23.9% of those under age 18 and 9.6% of those age 65 or over.

== Arts and culture ==
Sites listed on the National Register of Historic Places include:

- Dr. Chester Hunt Office
- Forty-Seventh Camp of Rochambeau's Army
- Fourth Camp of Rochambeau's Army
- Main Street Historic District
- March Route of Rochambeau's Army: Scotland Road
- Willimantic Armory
- Windham Center Historic District

== Education ==
The Windham Public School system serves students from pre-K through high school. Elementary schools are district-based, while Windham Middle School and Windham High School serve all residents. The school district has a preschool, four elementary schools, a middle school, a high school and an alternative high school. The alternative high school, Windham Phoenix Academy, is designed to provide individualized instruction and offers a transition program for 18-22 year olds (Assisted Work Program). As of January 2024, the district schools enrolled 3,209 students. Among those students, one in three students is an English language learner, among the highest proportions of Connecticut school districts.

In Willimantic, a public STEM-focused magnet school, Charles Barrows, enrolls students in kindergarten through eighth grade through a lottery system. At the high school level, Windham Technical High School offers technical education to students from Windham and surrounding towns. Windham Tech is a part of the Connecticut Technical High School System, rather than the public school district. Windham Tech students come from twenty-three different towns as of the 2023-24 school year.

In addition, high schoolers from Windham may attend E. O. Smith High School through its vocational agriculture program, in the neighboring town of Mansfield. In Willimantic there is also a specialized high school, Arts at the Capitol Theater Performing Arts High School, operated by the non-profit organization EASTCONN. A Catholic school for students in grades pre-K through 8, St. Mary-St. Joseph, is also located in downtown Willimantic.

Public Schools located in the town of Windham:

- Windham Early Childhood Center (pre-K)
- Natchaug School (K-5)
- North Windham School (K-5)
- W.B. Sweeney School (K-5)
- Windham Center School (K-5)
- Windham Middle School (6-8)
- Windham High School (9-12)
- Windham Technical High School (9-12)
- Charles H. Barrows STEM Academy (K-8 magnet school)

Private Schools located in the town of Windham:

- Arts at the Capitol Theater
- St. Mary-St. Joseph School (pre-K to 8)

=== Higher education ===
Eastern Connecticut State University, a four-year liberal arts college, is located in Willimantic, as is a satellite campus of Quinebaug Valley Community College.

== Infrastructure ==
=== Transportation ===
Route 32 runs through South Windham and north-western Willimantic. Route 66 goes east to west from North Windham to Columbia. Route 14 serves Willimantic to Windham Center. Route 203 serves the eastern section of town from North Windham to South Windham. Route 195 goes from Willimantic to Mansfield eventually going to the University of Connecticut. Route 289 starts in southern Willimantic and shortly after going into Lebanon to Route 87. US 6 bypasses Willimantic and serves North Windham. Bus service is available around the town seven days a week. Windham Airport is a general aviation airport located in North Windham. Bradley International Airport (BDL) in Windsor Locks is the closest major commercial airport. There is no passenger train service, but a freight train stop is found in Willimantic for the Providence and Worcester Railroad. Bus service is provided by the Windham Region Transit District, and Connecticut Transit express bus route 918.

== Notable people ==
- George Hewitt Cushman (1814–1876), engraver and painter of miniature paintings and portraits
- Eliphalet Dyer (1721–1807), a lawyer, jurist, and delegate for Connecticut to the Continental Congress, was born in town
- Benjamin Hanks (1755–1824), goldsmith, instrument maker, and first maker of bronze cannons and church bells in America
- William Hebard (1800–1875), a United States representative from Vermont was born in town
- Samuel Huntington (1731–1796), signed the Declaration of Independence and the Articles of Confederation; was the 18th governor of Connecticut
- Jerusha Bingham Kirkland (1743–1788), missionary; niece of Eleazar Wheelock
- Gardiner Means (1896–1988), economist
- Mary A. Ripley (1831–1893), author, lecturer, teacher
- Eleazar Wheelock (1711–1779), a Congregational minister, orator, educator, and founder of Dartmouth College, was born in town
