= Dr. Chester Hunt Office =

- U.S. National Register of Historic Places
- U.S. Historic district – Contributing property
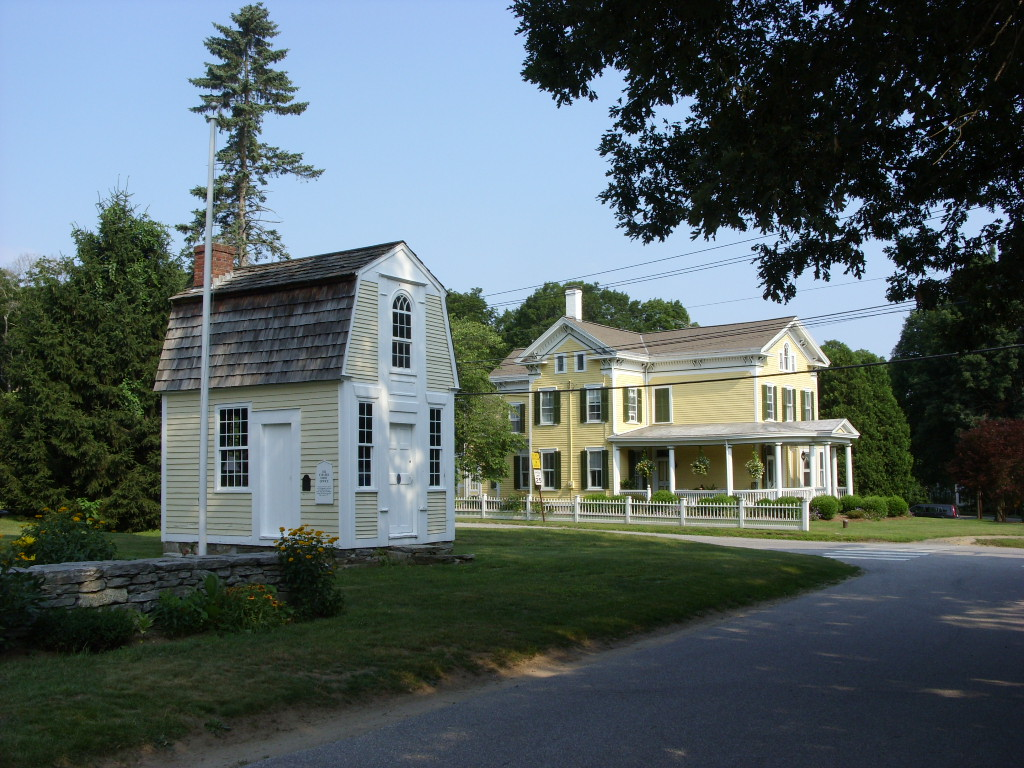
- Office building is in the foreground

- Location within Connecticut Location within the United States
- Interactive map showing the location of Dr. Chester Hunt Office
- Location: Windham, Connecticut
- Coordinates: 41°42′0″N 72°9′30″W
- Area: less than one acre
- Built: c. 1800
- Architectural style: Federal
- Part of: Windham Center Historic District (ID79002655)
- NRHP reference No.: 70000708

Significant dates
- Added to NRHP: October 6, 1970
- Designated CP: June 4, 1979

The Dr. Chester Hunt Office is an historic building on Windham Green Road in the village of Windham Center in Windham, Connecticut. Probably built in the early 19th century, it is one of the center's few surviving examples of commercial Federal period architecture. The building was listed on the National Register of Historic Places in 1970.

== Description and history ==
The Dr. Chester Hunt Office building is located on the west side of the Windham Center green, facing the green across Windham Green Road. It is located on the grounds of the Windham Free Library, a short way to its north. It is a small wood frame building with a gambrel roof and a clapboarded exterior. The front facade has the building entrance, flanked by narrow six-over-six sash windows, and topped in the gable by a sash window with a round-arch light above. There is a secondary entrance on the left facade, which appears to be an original board-and-batten door, with a twelve-over-twelve sash to its left.

The office was built in the early 19th century; its original purpose is unknown. It retains a great deal of original material, including external clapboard siding fastened with handcut nails, and stencilwork on its interior walls. The building was used by Dr. Hunt in the mid-19th century as an office and medical dispensary, and was located behind his house, at the southwest corner of the Windham Green. It was moved to its present location when it was donated to the library association.

== See also ==
- National Register of Historic Places listings in Windham County, Connecticut
