= 1911–12 Connecticut Aggies men's basketball team =

American college basketball season

1911–12 Connecticut Aggies men's basketball
- Conference: Athletic League of New England State Colleges
- Record: 6–3 (0–0 ALNESC)

The 1911–12 Connecticut Aggies men's basketball team represented Connecticut Agricultural College, now the University of Connecticut, in the 1911–12 collegiate men's basketball season. The Aggies completed the season with a 6–3 overall record. The Aggies were members of the Athletic League of New England State Colleges.

== Schedule ==
| Date time, TV | Rank^{#} | Opponent^{#} | Result | Record | Site (attendance) city, state |
Regular Season
| * | | Windham High School | W 26–14 | 1–0 | |
| * | | Hopkins Prep | W 40–11 | 2–0 | |
| * | | New Haven High School | L 12–22 | 2–1 | |
| * | | New London Manual | W 51–27 | 3–1 | |
| * | | Dean Academy | L 29–42 | 3–2 | |
| * | | Grex Club | L 23–36 | 3–3 | |
| * | | New London Manual | W 26–15 | 4–3 | |
| * | | Monson | W 15–9 | 5–3 | |
| * | | Alumni | W 22–16 | 6–3 | |
*Non-conference game. ^{#}Rankings from AP Poll. (#) Tournament seedings in parentheses. All times are in Eastern Time.

Schedule Source:
