= E. O. Smith High School =

Public school in Storrs, Connecticut, United States

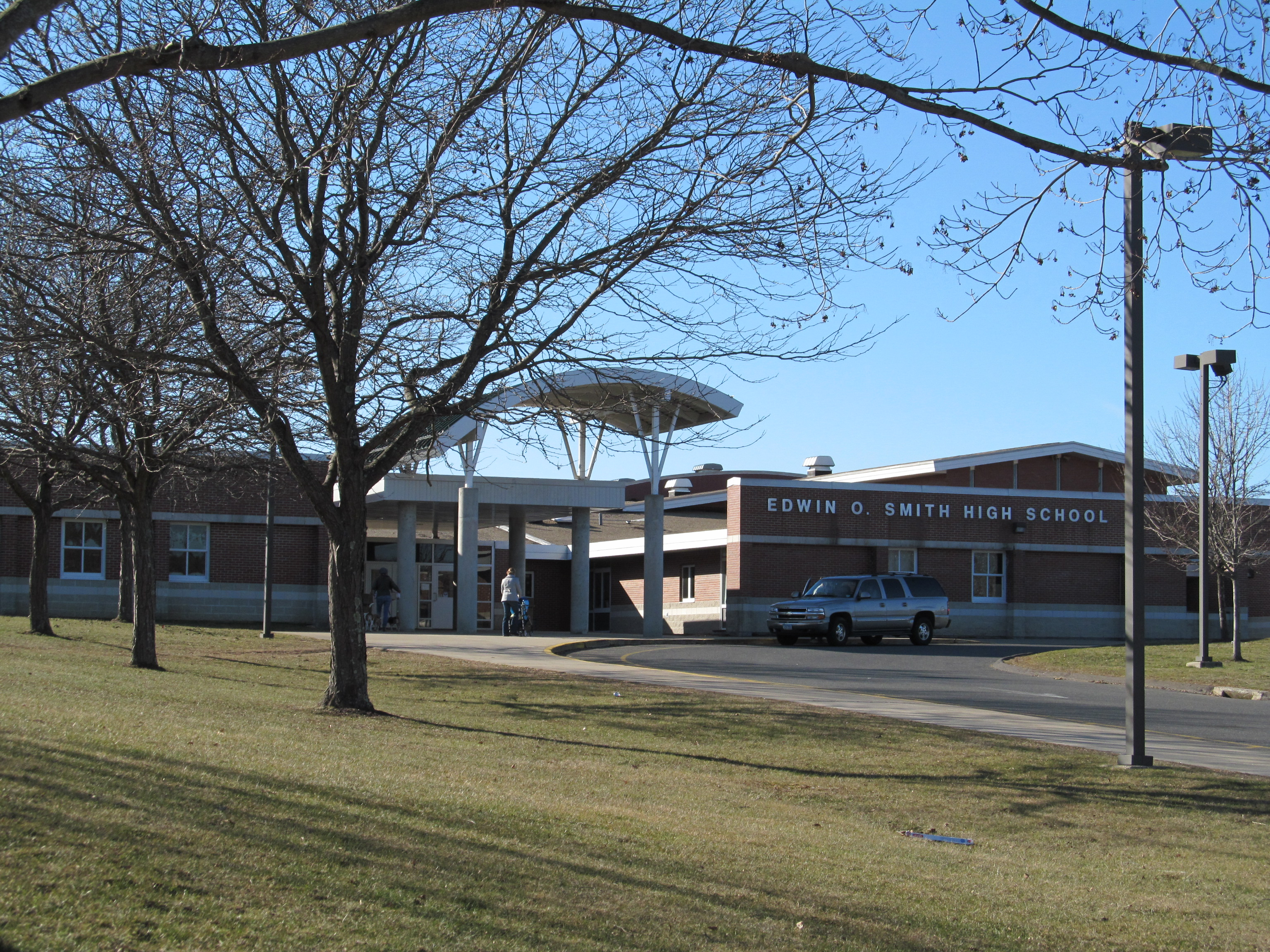

Location
- 1235 Storrs Road; Storrs, Tolland County, Connecticut 06268; United States; 41°48′09″N 72°14′39″W

Information
- Type: Public school
- Established: September 1958 (68 years ago)
- School district: Regional School District 19
- CEEB code: 070754
- Teaching staff: 93.30 (on an FTE basis)
- Grades: 9–12
- Enrollment: 1,033 (2023–2024)
- Student to teacher ratio: 11.07
- Colors: Red and black
- Team name: Panthers
- Rivals: Tolland
- Website: eosmith.org

E. O. Smith High School, (or E.O. Smith) named after a member of Connecticut's legislature and former University of Connecticut president Edwin O. Smith, is a secondary school located in Storrs, Connecticut, United States. E.O. Smith was established by the University of Connecticut in 1958 as the first high school in the area.

== Overview ==
E.O. Smith High School serves the towns of Ashford, Mansfield, and Willington, which together make up Connecticut's Regional School District #19. E.O. Smith also serves students from the nearby town of Columbia, and students from surrounding towns such as Coventry and Windham may attend E. O. Smith as participants in the school's Agriculture Education program. The Depot Campus, also in Mansfield, provides a non-traditional model of education, emphasizing internships and smaller classes.

== History ==
E. O. Smith was established in 1958 as a laboratory school for research and teacher training for the University of Connecticut, serving the towns of Ashford and Mansfield. It is located adjacent to the University of Connecticut campus, and was owned by the State of Connecticut and operated by the university until June 30, 1987. On that day, Public Act 84-42 was instated and the State Legislature voted to give ownership of the school to the Town of Mansfield and the Town of Ashford as long as the towns agreed to pay for the physical rehabilitation of the school. The Town of Willington joined the region in 1993.

In the early 2000s, the district superintendent, Bruce Silva, oversaw a referendum for a $31.5 million expansion and renovation at E.O. Smith that was "completed under budget and on time." Silva was superintendent of the Regional School District 19 for twenty-five years and an administrator for the district for forty years, with twenty-three consecutive school budgets approved by the time of his retirement in 2017. During that time, he planned and renovated the Reynolds School to become the non-traditional Depot Campus school.

Dr. Louis DeLoreto has been principal of E.O. Smith since 2001. DeLoreto is a graduate of UConn's educational administration program.

== Student demographics ==
In the 2021-22 academic year, E.O. Smith had an enrollment of 1,094 students in grades 9-12, and a student-teacher ratio of 12.7 to 1. While enrollment has been flat since the 2018-19 school year (1,091 students), the number of teachers has fallen, so the student-teacher ratio has increased (from 11.2 to 12.7).

About one quarter (26%) of students come from poor households (measured by how many qualify for free or reduced-price school lunch). The majority of E.O. Smith students identify as white (76 percent), while 7 percent identify as Asian, 12 percent Hispanic, and 4 percent Black. Less than one percent of the student body identifies as multiracial, American Indian, Alaska Native, or Native Hawaiian/Pacific Islander.

== Academics ==
As a regional public high school, E.O. Smith offers a general secondary education curriculum, including foreign languages, science courses, history, English, etc. It has a special program in agriscience, tracing to its proximity to and history as part of UConn, which began as the Storrs Agricultural College. Students at E.O. Smith may take early college courses for credit at the University of Connecticut (adjacent to the high school campus), Eastern Connecticut State University in Willimantic, or Manchester Community College, in Manchester.

== Extracurricular activities and sports ==
E.O. Smith science students have been active in a coral reef conservation project, propagating and maintaining a reef aquarium so students can learn about aquaculture, marine biology and reef ecosystems. E.O. Smith has hosted the New England Frag Farmer's Market for fifteen years, and it has become the biggest one-day coral event in the country, with over 1,500 attendees in 2019.

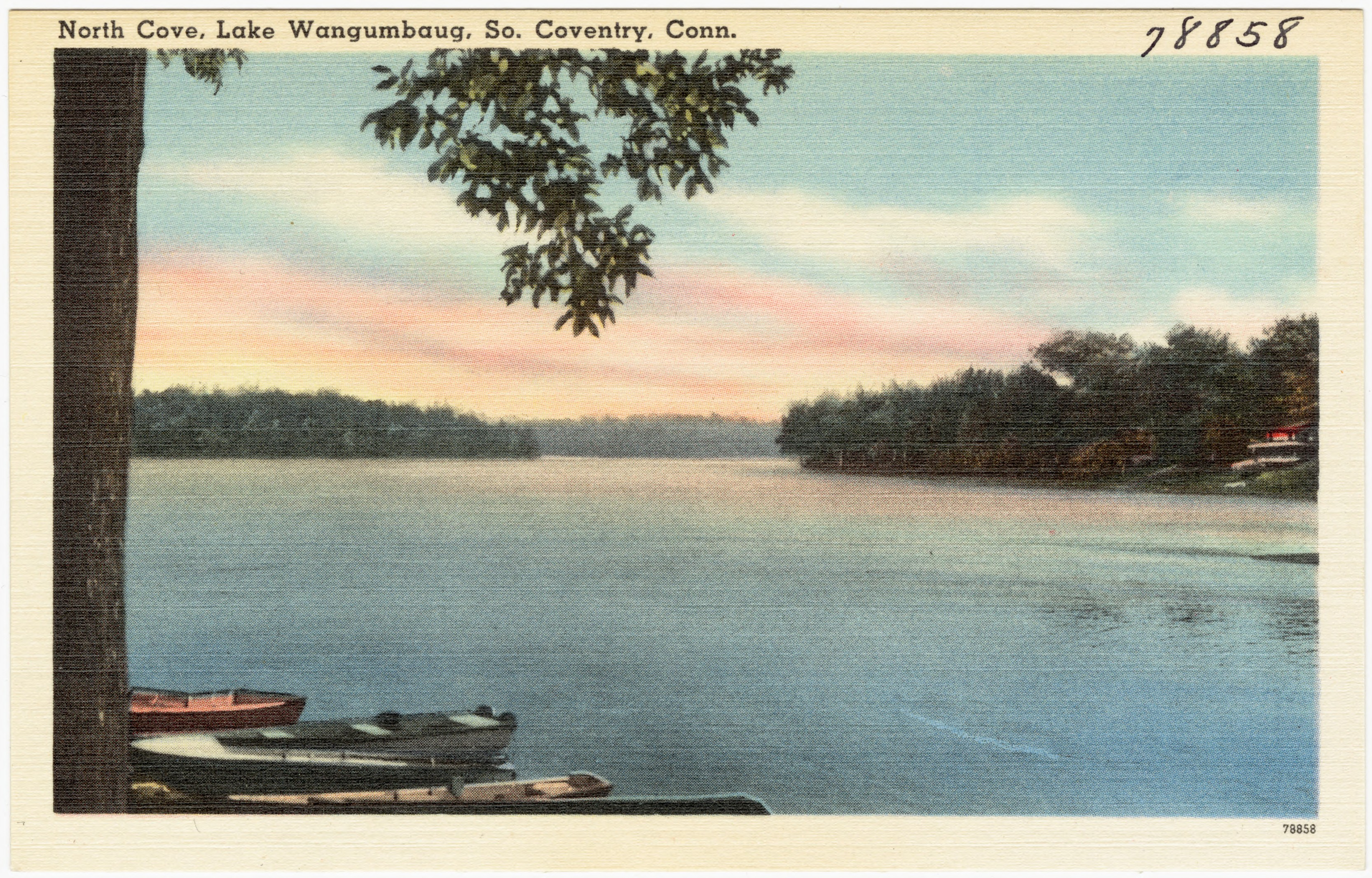
Wangumbaug Lake, in Coventry, Connecticut, location of rowing practice for the crew team.

E.O. Smith soccer has an impressive record. The boys soccer coach for forty years, John Blomstrann, has led the teams to more wins than any other coach in Connecticut history. From 1980 to 2020, Blomstrann coached the teams to 565 victories. During a three-year period from 1980 to 1983, the boys' soccer team won all but two games in the Eastern Connecticut Conference.

The girls' 2014 season was disrupted when the team's coach, Jeffrey Sirois, sent an "inappropriate" video via Snapchat to the young players on his team, for which he was arrested and fired.

Among its most successful soccer alumni are E.O. Smith players Eleni Benson and Lyle Yorks. Benson was a three time all-conference selection and was named All-New England and all-state as a high school senior. She played for Yale University, and was a defender for Greece women's national team in the 2004 Olympics. Lyle Yorks was one of the most highly decorated youth players in Connecticut. Yorks won two NCAA championships with the University of Virginia team, and then went on to a career in Major League Soccer.

The school's co-ed crew was established in 1992. As the sport is dominated by private schools, it is the only public school rowing program in Northeastern Connecticut. The team practices at Coventry Lake (Wangumbaug Lake) in the town of Coventry, where it shares a boathouse at with the UConn Huskies rowing team and uses some of the college's equipment.

The E.O. Smith Drama Club presents four shows per year, including a winter musical, two straight shows in the fall and spring, and a night of senior directed one-acts at the end of the year. The spring show is performed at the Connecticut Drama Association Festival where cast and crew members have a chance to win awards and advance to the New England Drama Festival. E.O. Smith's Drama Club has won several awards from the Connecticut Drama Association including outstanding performance for Animal Farm (2009) and Lily's Purple Plastic Purse (2010), allowing them to continue to the New England Drama Festival, which E.O. Smith hosted in 2009. Several E. O. Smith actors have also won individual awards for their performances in the shows or in the Connecticut Drama Association Monologue Contest.

The school has had competitive computer science and math teams since the early 1980s.

== Notable alumni ==
- Desireé Bassett (2010) — guitar virtuoso
- Eleni Benson — Yale soccer defender, 2004 Olympic player for the Greece women's team
- Rivers Cuomo (1988) — musician, frontman of Weezer
- Elliot Gerson — American secretary to the Rhodes Trust
- Jennifer Gordon (1983) — MacArthur Fellow, professor and immigrant rights lawyer
- Tim Page — Pulitzer Prize-winning critic and author
- Peter Tork (1959) — musician, member of The Monkees, first graduating class at EOS
- Lyle Yorks (1988) — MLS soccer midfielder, two-time NCAA champion at University of Virginia
