= Willington, Connecticut =

- Town
- Town of Willington
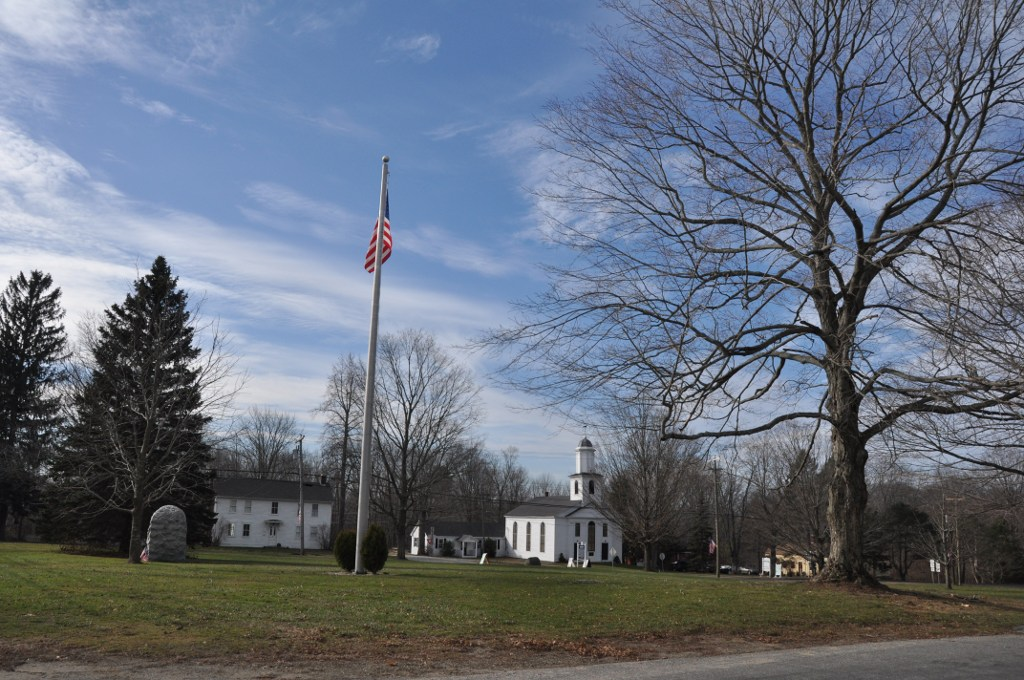
- Willington Common

- Seal

- Coordinates: 41°53′07″N 72°15′41″W
- Country: United States
- U.S. state: Connecticut
- County: Tolland
- Region: Capitol Region
- Incorporated: May 1727
- Named For: Wellington, Somersetshire

Government
  - Type: Selectman-town meeting
  - First selectman: Peter Tanaka (R)
  - Selectman: G. Matthew Clark (R)
  - Selectman: George A. Marco (Unaffiliated)

Area
  - Total: 33.5 sq mi (86.8 km^{2})
  - Land: 33.3 sq mi (86.2 km^{2})
  - Water: 0.19 sq mi (0.5 km^{2})
- Elevation: 761 ft (232 m)

Population (2010)
  - Total: 5,566
  - Density: 167/sq mi (64.6/km^{2})
- Time zone: UTC−5 (Eastern)
  - Summer (DST): UTC−4 (Eastern)
- ZIP Code: 06279
- Area codes: 860/959
- FIPS code: 09-85950
- GNIS feature ID: 0213534
- Website: www.willingtonct.gov

Willington is a town in Tolland County, Connecticut, United States. The town is part of the Capitol Planning Region. The population was 5,566 at the 2020 census.

The Willimantic River borders the town on the west. Willington is approximately 25 miles northeast of Hartford on Interstate 84, which also provides a connection to Boston, via the Massachusetts Turnpike. Providence, RI is accessible via U.S. Route 44. Larger communities nearby include Coventry, Stafford, Tolland, and Willimantic. The University of Connecticut is located in adjacent Mansfield. A new public library (formerly located within Hall Memorial School) opened in autumn 2006.

== History ==
In 1720 a party of eight men, originally from England, bought 16,000 acres of the region and called it Wellington. Willington was incorporated in May 1727. Named "Wellington," in May 1725, from Wellington, Somersetshire, the birthplace of Roger Wolcott's grandfather Henry Wolcott. However, when incorporated in May 1727, the town's name was written as "Willington." Willington became a part of Tolland County when it was formed from portions of eastern Hartford County and western Windham County on October 13, 1785.

The town was well adapted for grazing and lumbering. After a century of farming, the town gradually expanded commercially and industrially. The c. 1815 Daniel Glazier Tavern includes an upstairs ballroom that was used for almost thirty years as a town meetinghouse in cold weather.

By 1845 Willington included a thread mill, a cotton mill, three silk factories, a scythe factory, four comb factories, button mills, and a glassworks (1815–1871) producing demijohns and flasks of various designs.

== Geography ==
According to the United States Census Bureau, the town has a total area of 33.5 square miles (87 km^{2}), of which 33.3 square miles (86 km^{2}) is land and 0.2 square miles (0.52 km^{2}) (0.63%) is water.

== Notable people ==
- Jeremiah Chaplin (1776–1841), a Reformed Baptist theologian who preached in town
- Philip Corbin (1824–1910), a businessman and founder of P&F Corbin Company, was born in town
- William H. Hall (1869–1922), a president pro tempore of the Connecticut State Senate
- William L. Higgins (1867–1951), a US Congressman and doctor who practiced medicine in town
- Orrin Holt (1792–1855), 1st representative of Connecticut's 6th congressional district; born and died in town
- Elias Loomis (1811–1889), a mathematician and astronomer, was born in town
- Jared Sparks (1792–1866), historian, Unitarian minister and President of Harvard University. A street named in his honor extends from the town green to Moose Meadow Road
- Justus Vinton (1806–1858), a Baptist missionary to Myanmar, was born in town
- Roger Wolcott (1679–1767), 28th Governor of the Connecticut Colony (1750–1754), one of the town's founders
- Eleni Benson (born 1983), Olympic soccer player

== Demographics ==
Historical population
Census	Pop.	Note	%±
1820	1,246		—
1850	1,388		—
1860	1,166		−16.0%
1870	942		−19.2%
1880	1,086		15.3%
1890	906		−16.6%
1900	885		−2.3%
1910	1,112		25.6%
1920	1,200		7.9%
1930	1,213		1.1%
1940	1,233		1.6%
1950	1,462		18.6%
1960	2,005		37.1%
1970	3,755		87.3%
1980	4,694		25.0%
1990	5,979		27.4%
2000	5,959		−0.3%
2010	6,041		1.4%
2020	5,566		−7.9%
U.S. Decennial Census

As of the census of 2000 (a 2010 census is available), there were 5,959 people, 2,353 households, and 1,437 families residing in the town. The population density was 179.1 inhabitants per square mile (69.2/km^{2}). There were 2,429 housing units at an average density of 73.0 per square mile (28.2/km^{2}). The racial makeup of the town was 94.06% White, 0.97% African American, 0.12% Native American, 3.02% Asian, 0.08% Pacific Islander, 0.62% from other races, and 1.12% from two or more races. Hispanic or Latino of any race were 1.81% of the population.

There were 2,423 households, of which 24.3% had children under the age of 18 living with them, 49.3% were married couples living together, 11.2% were single householders with no spouse present (7.4% female householder, 3.8% male), and 39.5% were non-families. 21.3% of all households were made up of individuals, and 5.7% had someone living alone who was 65 years of age or older. The average household size was 2.48 and the average family size was 2.92.

In the town, the population was spread out, with 20.4% under the age of 20, 16.9% from 20 to 24, 21.3% from 25 to 44, 30.7% from 45 to 64, and 4.4% who were 65 years of age or older. The median age was 38.3 years.

The median income for a household in the town was $51,690, and the median income for a family was $70,684. Males had a median income of $41,250 versus $36,310 for females. The per capita income for the town was $27,062. About 2.9% of families and 13.3% of the population were below the poverty line, including 4.0% of those under age 18 and 3.1% of those age 65 or over.

== Education ==
Elementary and middle school-aged residents attend schools in the Willington School District.

All residents are zoned to:

- Center Elementary School (Kindergarten through 4)
- Hall Memorial School (Grades 5 through 8)

High school-aged residents attend E. O. Smith High School of the Regional School District 19, as well as an option to attend Windham Technical High School.

Prior to the community's affiliation with Regional School District 19, Willington offered its high school–aged students a choice attending one of the two institutions. Numbers varied from year to year, having the undesired effect of breaking up classes and bussing them distances of up to 15 miles. The two available choices as of 2018 are:

- E. O. Smith High School in Mansfield, Connecticut
- Windham Technical High School in Windham, Connecticut.

== Popular culture ==
Willington was featured on the Fox science fiction show Fringe in Season 5, Episode 9 ("Black Blotter").

Willington was the start of spree killer/kidnapper Peter Manfredonia's multi-state crime spree where he murdered a resident, injured another and took a third resident hostage in his home.
