= Mary Ripley =

Mary Ripley may refer to:

- Mary A. Ripley (1831–1893), American author, lecturer, and teacher
- Mary Livingston Ripley (1914–1996), American horticulturist, entomologist, photographer, and scientific collector
