= George Hewitt Cushman =

American painter

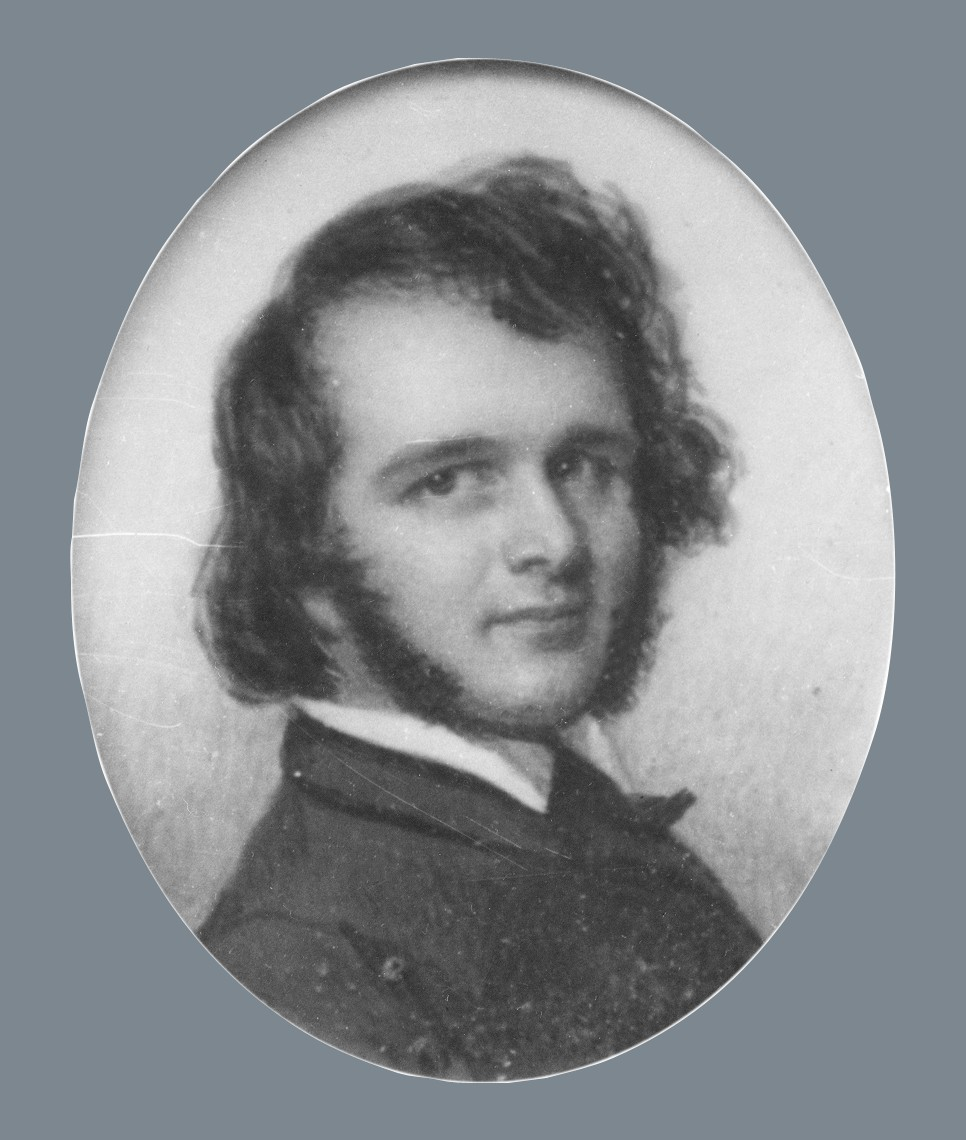
- Born: 1814; Windham, Connecticut, U.S.
- Died: 1876 (aged 61–62); Jersey City Heights, New Jersey, U.S.
- Resting place: Laurel Hill Cemetery, Philadelphia, Pennsylvania, U.S.
- Occupation: Painter

George Hewitt Cushman (June 5, 1814 – August 3, 1876) was a top American engraver and painter of miniature paintings and portraits of his time (second only to Edward Greene Malbone). He turned early to these professions after family financial misfortunes prevented him from entering West Point and becoming a soldier.

He studied drawing under Washington Allston and line engraving with Asaph Willard and Seth and John Cheney (with whom he later shared a studio in Boston).

In 1843 he moved to Philadelphia and resided there for twenty years, appearing in the city's directory as a miniature painting and portrait painter. In 1849 he married Susan Wetherill. While in Philadelphia he engraved printing plates for many books, including James Fenimore Cooper's novels' thirty-four volumes (1859–1861), the household edition of Charles Dickens (1861), and Frances S. Osgood's Poems (1850), and portraits including Young America in the Alps, Forrest in William Rounseville Alger's Life of Edwin Forrest (1877), and a portrait of Lord Byron entitled inter alia.

He primarily engraved notes for state banks until the creation of the National Banking Act and the Bureau of Engraving and Printing in Washington D.C. caused him to retire from this work.

In 1862 he moved to New York City and created miniature paintings and portraits until his death at a water cure. His funeral was held at Chalkley Hall in Frankford, Philadelphia, Pennsylvania. His self-portrait is reproduced in Anne Hollingsworth Wharton's Heirlooms in Miniatures (1898).

His genius would have placed him atop most American miniature painters. His signed engravings were noted as being "executed with much taste and ability". Sara Jane Lippincott remarked that his miniatures "were always remarkable for purity and simplicity of character as well as tone". However his extreme modesty always precluded him from ever exhibiting his miniatures save only to his friends.

In 1928 the New York Public Library displayed examples of his engravings in a presentation of the works of one hundred notable American engravers. A group of his miniatures were publicly displayed front and center at the Retrospective Exhibition of the Columbian Exposition in Chicago in 1893.

He died on August 3, 1876, in Jersey City, New Jersey, and was interred at Laurel Hill Cemetery in Philadelphia.
