= Willimantic Armory =

- U.S. National Register of Historic Places
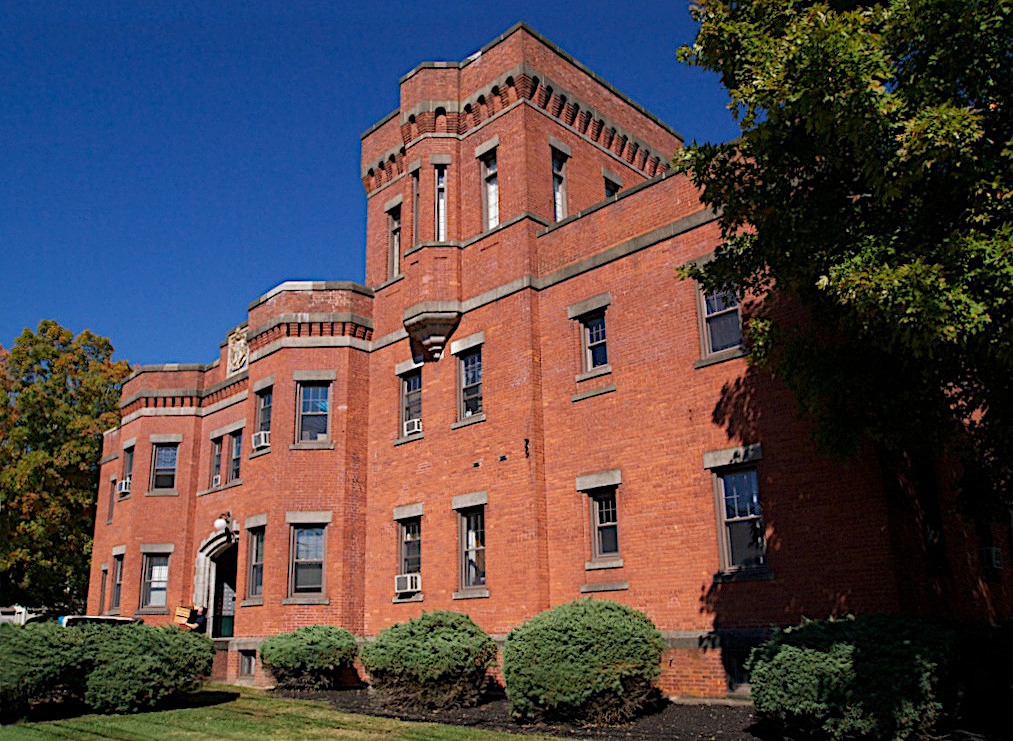

- Location within Connecticut Location within the United States
- Location: Pleasant Street, Windham, Connecticut
- Coordinates: 41°42′35″N 72°12′54″W
- Area: 2.3 acres (0.93 ha)
- Built: 1912
- Built by: F. D. Kent
- Architect: Whiton & McMahon
- Architectural style: Tudor Revival, Romanesque
- NRHP reference No.: 85002310
- Added to NRHP: September 12, 1985

Willimantic Armory is a historic armory building located on Pleasant Street in Windham, Connecticut. It served as a facility for the Connecticut National Guard from 1913 until 1980, when the building was sold to developers who converted the building into apartments.

== History ==
In 1909, city officials from Willimantic petitioned the Connecticut General Assembly for funding to construct a modern armory. Despite opposition from a few senators concerned about the expansion of military infrastructure, the bill passed, allocating $50,000 for the construction of a single-company armory. A 300-by-160-foot lot was purchased from Samuel Chesbro for $6,500, and the architectural firm Whiton & McMahon was awarded the design contract. The builder, F. D. Kent, received $32,405 for construction.

The armory originally housed Company B of the 169th Infantry until the 1960s, when it was reassigned to the 248th Engineer Company. The facility remained the home of the 248th until the late 1970s, when a new armory was constructed in Norwich, Connecticut, and the unit was relocated.

Following its closure, the Willimantic Armory was sold to developers who converted the building into apartments, preserving the exterior while renovating the interior, eliminating most traces of the original design.

The armory was added to the National Register of Historic Places in 1985.

== Characteristics ==
The Willimantic Armory consisted of two distinct elements, both of red-brick construction. The head house was a two-story, flat-roofed structure surmounted by a high parapet and a blocky tower. The drill shed was a 1 1/2-story gable-roofed structure in the rear of the head house.

== See also ==
- National Register of Historic Places listings in Windham County, Connecticut
