= Eleni Benson =

American-born Greek former footballer

Personal information
- Full name: Eleni Marie Benson
- Date of birth: 12 January 1983 (age 43)
- Place of birth: Willington, Connecticut, U.S.
- Position: Defender

College career
Years	Team	Apps	(Gls)
2001–2005	Yale Bulldogs		

International career
2004	Greece	25 (?)	(0)

Eleni Marie Benson (Greek: Ελένη Μπένσον; born 12 January 1983) is an American-born Greek former footballer who played as a defender. She has been a member of the Greece women's national team.

== College career ==
Before college, Benson was a star high school soccer player at E. O. Smith High School, in Mansfield, Connecticut. Benson went on to attend and play for Yale University in New Haven, Connecticut.

== International career ==
Benson played for Greece at senior level in the 2004 Summer Olympics.

== Personal life ==
Benson is married and has added her married name, Rettig, to her American nationality.

== See also ==
- Greece at the 2004 Summer Olympics
