= Lyle Yorks =

American soccer player and coach

Personal information
- Date of birth: January 30, 1970 (age 56)
- Place of birth: Mansfield, Connecticut, United States
- Height: 5 ft 11 in (1.80 m)
- Position: Midfielder

College career
Years	Team	Apps	(Gls)
1988–1991	Virginia Cavaliers		

Senior career*
Years	Team	Apps	(Gls)
1992–1993	Milwaukee Wave (indoor)	5	(2)
1993–1994	Næstved		
1995	New York Fever		
1998	D.C. United	1	(0)

International career
- United States U16
- United States U20

Managerial career
- 1995–1997: California Golden Bears (assistant)
- Stanford University (assistant)
- * Club domestic league appearances and goals

Lyle Yorks (born January 30, 1970) is a retired American soccer midfielder who played professionally in the Major Indoor Soccer League, USISL and Major League Soccer. He was the 1987 Gatorade National Player of the Year and was a member of the U.S. soccer teams at both the 1985 FIFA U-16 World Championship and 1989 FIFA World Youth Championship. He is the managing director of James Grant Sports.

== Youth ==
=== Club ===
Yorks attended E. O. Smith High School where he was part of a two time state championship soccer team. Yorks was a two time Parade Magazine and NSCAA High School All American and in 1987, he was the Gatorade National Player of the Year. In 1988, he entered the University of Virginia where he played on the 1989 and 1991 NCAA Championship soccer team. He captained the team in 1991 as the Cavaliers tied with the Santa Clara Broncos for the NCAA Men's Division I Soccer Championship. He graduated with a bachelor degree in sociology from Virginia and later earned a master's degree in sports management from the University of San Francisco.

=== National teams ===
In 1985, Yorks was a member of the U.S. U-16 national team which went 1–2 in the 1985 FIFA U-16 World Championship. Yorks played all three games. In 1989, he played two games for the U.S. U-20 national team which took fourth place at the 1989 FIFA World Youth Championship.

== Professional ==
On November 21, 1992, Yorks signed with the Milwaukee Wave of the National Professional Soccer League. He played only five games before being waived on January 7, 1993, in order to free up a roster spot for Paul Wright. Yorks then moved to Denmark where he signed with Næstved BK for the 1993–1994 Danish 1st Division season. In 1995, he played for the New York Fever of the USISL. In December 1995, he signed with Major League Soccer as the league prepared for its first season in 1996. However, he was not selected in the January 1996 MLS drafts. In February 1998, Yorks was invited to the D.C. United training camp. On March 10, 1998, United signed Yorks. He played one game, then was waived on May 11, 1998. A month later, he played an exhibition game with the Richmond Kickers. The team hoped to sign him for the remainder of the regular season, but Yorks retired from playing professionally.

== Coach ==
Following his playing career, Lyle was an assistant coach at the University of California at Berkeley from 1995 to 1997 as well as one season at Stanford University.

He was inducted into the Connecticut Soccer Hall of Fame in 2008.

== Soccer Agent ==
Lyle is currently the Global Head of Sport for James Grant Sports Management Ltd. As USSF registered FIFA agent, Lyle has brokered some of the biggest deals for US players both in MLS and Europe.
