= Hall Memorial School =

Coordinates: 41.8516°N 72.3021°W

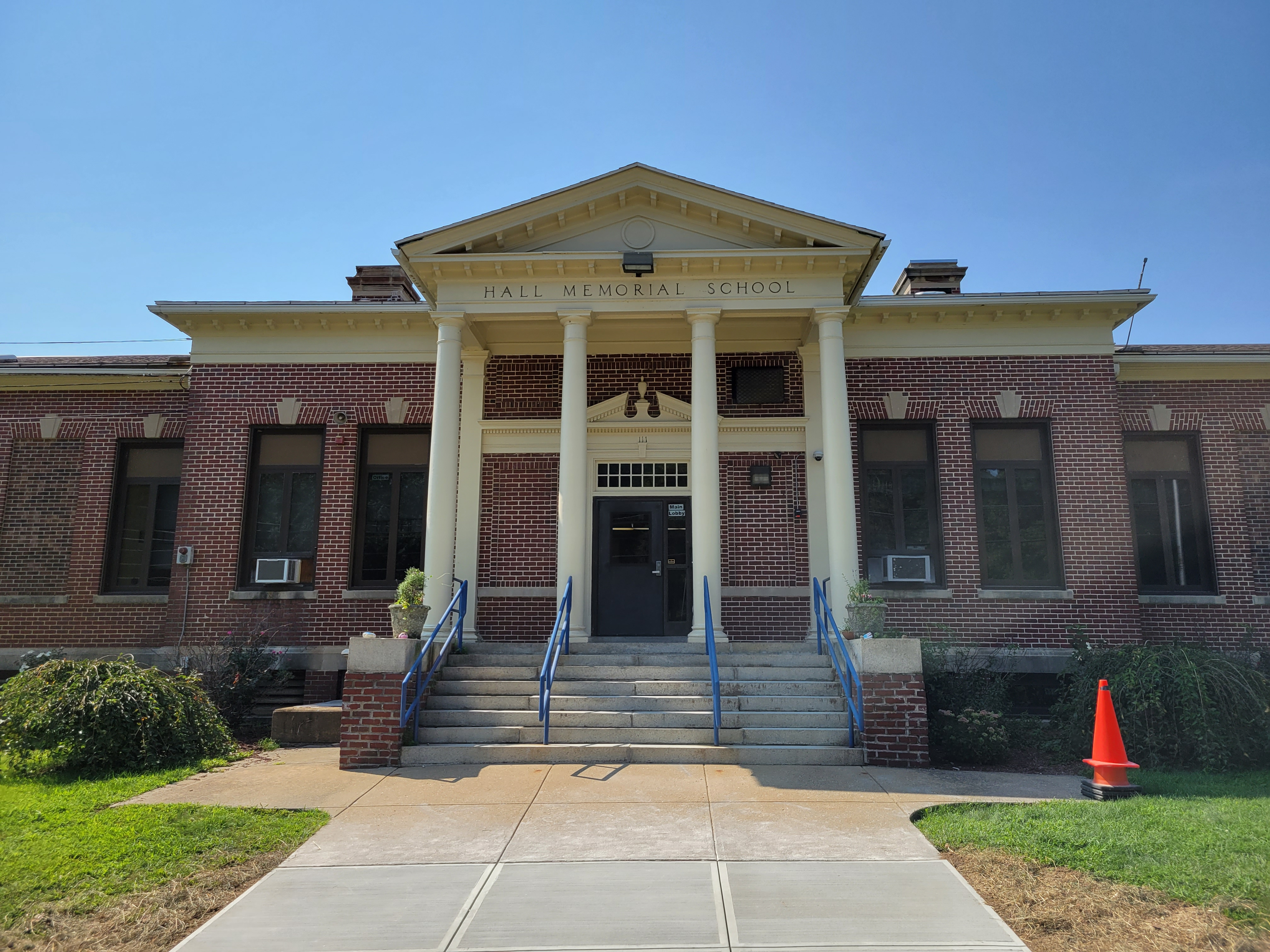

Location
- 111 River Road; Willington, Tolland County, Connecticut; United States

Information
- Established: 1922; 104 years ago
- Grades: 5-8
- Enrollment: c.320
- Website: hms.willingtonpublicschools.org/home

Hall Memorial School is located at 111 River Road (Route 32) in Willington, Connecticut. It serves only the town of Willington, grades 5 through 8. The school is fairly small, servicing about 320 students.

== History ==
Hall Memorial School was founded in 1922 and built in memory of Gardner Hall Sr., Gardner Hall Jr., and William H. Hall. From these names stem the school's namesake "Hall Memorial". The original school building was just six rooms. Since the initial construction, there have been two major additions, one adding 12 classrooms and another, in 1980, that added a new gymnasium and 6 more classrooms. Since then, existing rooms have been partitioned off to create more classroom space. More recent changes have been a complete makeover of the school's library (previously the Willington Public Library), a water main hookup with neighboring towns, and a new front sidewalk, lawn, and garden.

== Classroom Instruction ==
Hall Memorial School offers instruction to students in grades 5–8. Currently, students in grade 5 are taught in an all-inclusive classroom setting (no class changes). Students in grades 6-8 have a rotating 6 day schedule, and change classes throughout the day. Currently, the following classes are required:

| Grade 6 | Math (2-80 minute and 1-40 minute periods weekly) | Science (2-80 minute and 1-40 minute periods weekly) | Social Studies (2-80 minute and 1-40 minute periods weekly) | Language Arts (2-80 minute and 1-40 minute periods weekly) | Spanish (4-40 minute periods weekly) | Physical Education (2-40 minute periods weekly) | Health (2-40 minute periods weekly) | Art (4-40 minute periods weekly for 1 trimester of the school year) | General Music (4-40 minute periods weekly for 1 trimester of the school year) | Computers (4-40 minute periods weekly for 1 trimester of the school year) | Choir (Opt in only) | Band (Opt in only) |
| Grade 7 | Math (2-80 minute and 1-40 minute periods weekly) | Science (2-80 minute and 1-40 minute periods weekly) | Social Studies (2-80 minute and 1-40 minute periods weekly) | Language Arts (2-80 minute and 1-40 minute periods weekly) | Spanish (4-40 minute periods weekly) | Physical Education (2-40 minute periods weekly) | Health (2-40 minute periods weekly) | Art (4-40 minute periods weekly for 1 trimester of the school year) | General Music (4-40 minute periods weekly for 1 trimester of the school year) | Computers (4-40 minute periods weekly for 1 trimester of the school year) | Choir (Opt in only) | Band (Opt in only) |
| Grade 8 | Algebra 1 (Test-in) or Pre-algebra (2-80 minute and 1-45 minute periods weekly) | Science (2-80 minute and 1-40 minute periods weekly) | Social Studies (2-80 minute and 1-40 minute periods weekly) | Language Arts (2-80 minute and 1-40 minute periods weekly) | Spanish (4-40 minute periods weekly) | Physical Education (2-40 minute periods weekly) | Health (2-40 minute periods weekly) | Art (4-40 minute periods weekly for 1 trimester of the school year) | General Music (4-40 minute periods weekly for 1 trimester of the school year) | Computers (4-40 minute periods weekly for 1 trimester of the school year) | Choir (Opt in only) | Band (Opt in only) |

In addition, for students in grades 6–8, who are not enrolled in band or choir, there is a 40-minute Band/chorus/study.

== Sports ==
The school sports several athletic teams for both girls and boys. Sports include soccer (girls, boys), basketball (girls, boys), baseball (boys), softball (girls), and offer a volleyball club (girls, boys). The school colors are blue and white and the school mascot is the falcon.

== National History Day ==
Hall Memorial School has an excellent participation record in the National History Day program. Students in grades 6-8 are invited to participate with a year-long research project researched during the student's social studies classes. The project culminates with a District Competition. Students who place 1st, 2nd, or 3rd at the district competition are invited to participate in the Connecticut State History Day contest. Students who place 1st or 2nd at this contest are sent to the National Contest at University of Maryland College Park. This year, Hall Memorial School sent the most students to the state contest out of all schools in the district, and is also sending 7 students to the National History Day contest, the most out of any middle school in the state of Connecticut. Hall Memorial School has had competitors go to the National Contest for every year since 2002 (as of 2013).
