= William H. Hall =

American politician (1869–1922)

William Henry Hall
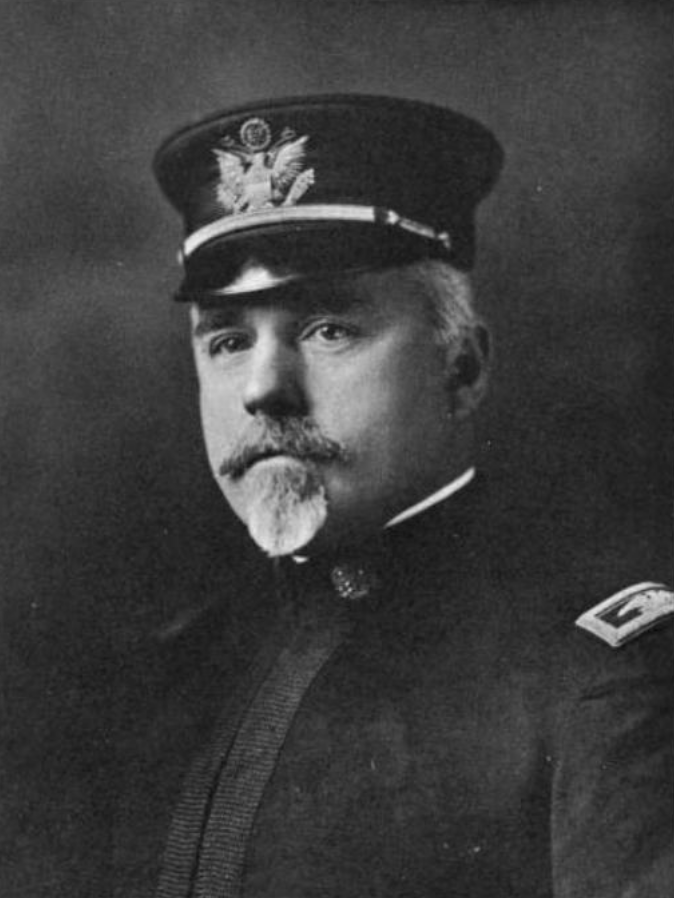

President Pro Tempore of the Connecticut State Senate
- In office 1921–1922
- Preceded by: William H. Heald
- Succeeded by: John H. Trumbull

Personal details
- Born: May 31, 1867 Willington, Connecticut, US
- Died: February 14, 1922 (aged 54) Daytona Beach, Florida
- Party: Republican Party
- Education: Wesleyan University (BA)
- Occupation: Politician, businessman

William Henry Hall (May 31, 1869 – February 14, 1922) was an American politician who served as president pro tempore of the Connecticut State Senate (1921–1922). A Republican from South Willington, Hall represented the Senate's 35th district.

== Early life and education ==
Hall was born in South Willington on May 31, 1867. He was the eldest of five children, and the only son, of businessman Gardiner Hall Jr. and Fannie (Parker) Hall. He received his Bachelor of Arts degree from Wesleyan University in 1892.

Hall took over his father's textile manufacturing firm, Gardiner Hall Jr. & Co. His father had constructed worker housing, a church, and a school. Hall added a model farm and developed a workforce made up increasingly of Eastern European immigrants. By the time of his death, Hall was a millionaire, leaving an estate worth over $1.3 million.

== Political career ==
Hall served in the Connecticut House of Representatives in 1893–1897 and again in 1905, 1909, and 1911. He was a member of the Committee on Appropriations and chair of the Committee on Assignment of Seats. He won the 1899, 1917, and 1921 state senate elections and became president pro tempore in 1921, serving until his death in 1922. He was active in Republican politics, attending every Republican state convention between 1893 and 1918 as well as two national conventions.

He held the military title of colonel due to his appointment as paymaster general by Governor Henry Roberts.

== Civic service ==
Hall served on the board of directors of local banks and manufacturers, including Berkshire Manufacturing Company, the Windham Silk Company, the American La France Fire Engine Company, the Willimantic Trust Company, and the First National Bank of Stafford Springs. He was president of Stafford Springs Agricultural Society, the New England Fair Association, and the Connecticut State Agricultural Society.

Hall served on the board of trustees of his alma mater, Wesleyan University, from 1912 until his death. His estate donated $175,000 to Wesleyan to construct a chemical laboratory named in his honor. This building was demolished in 1968 and replaced by the Hall-Atwater Laboratories, which memorializes Wilbur Olin Atwater as well.

Hall served on the University of Connecticut Board of Trustees in 1900–1903 and again in 1920–1922. He was instrumental in securing state funds to build the Benjamin F. Koons Hall, a men's dormitory, in 1911. In 1920, he obtained another $335,000 in state funding to construct the Marcus H. Holcomb Hall, a women's dormitory. The William H. Hall Building, a former men's dormitory that opened in 1927, was dedicated to his memory. The Hall Memorial School in Willington was also named in his honor.

== Personal life ==
Hall married Alice May Holman on June 14, 1894. The couple had five children: Doris Elizabeth, Gardiner Holman, Clara Alice, Holman Henry, and Frances Helen.

Hall died suddenly from a heart attack while on vacation in Daytona Beach, Florida, on February 14, 1922.
