= South Windham, Connecticut =

South Windham
- Village
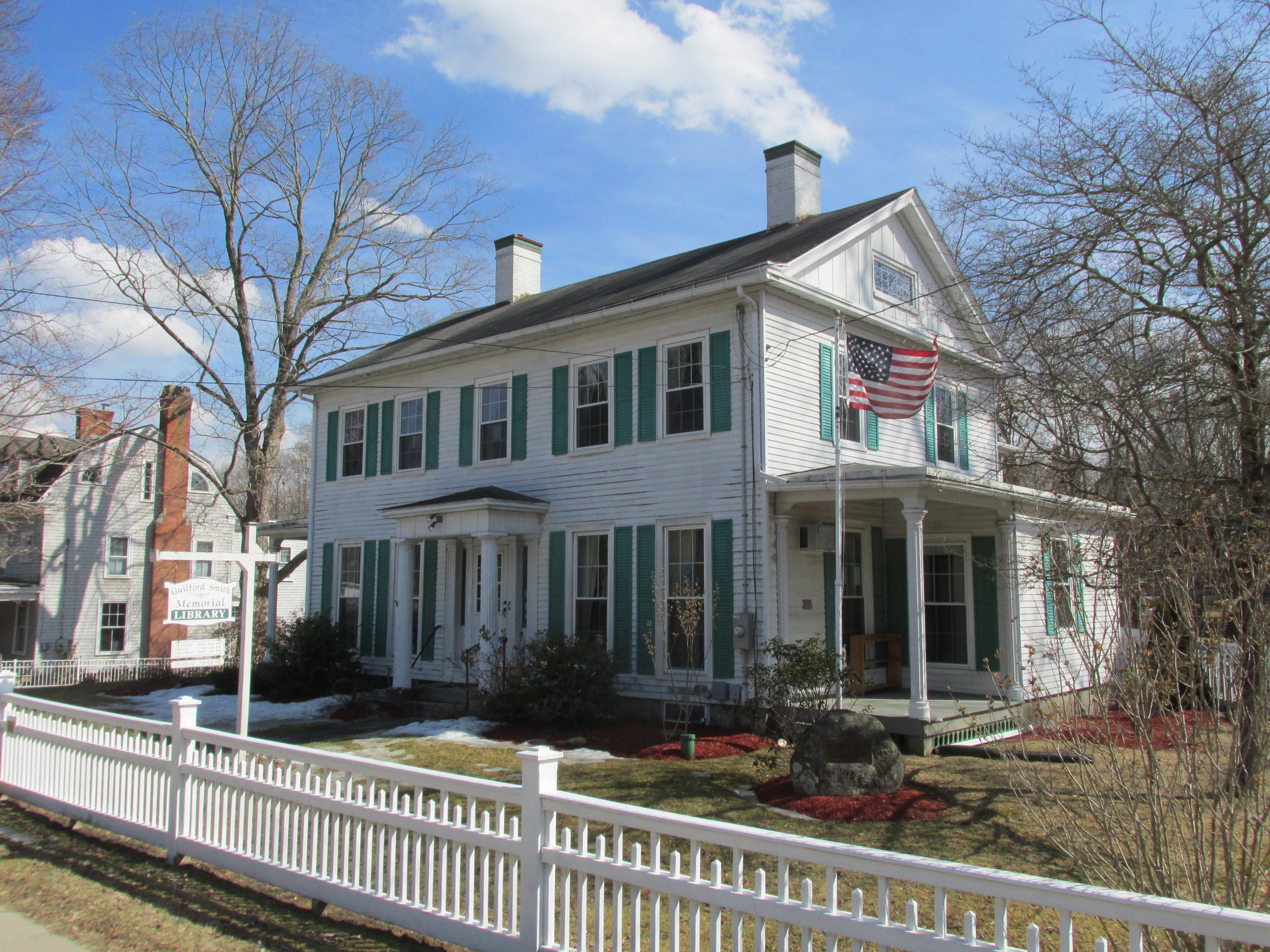
- Guilford Smith Memorial Library

- Location in Windham County and the state of Connecticut.
- Coordinates: 41°40′46″N 72°10′13″W
- Country: United States
- State: Connecticut
- Town: Windham

Area
  - Total: 3.1 sq mi (8.1 km^{2})
  - Land: 3.1 sq mi (8.1 km^{2})
  - Water: 0.039 sq mi (0.1 km^{2})
- Elevation: 335 ft (102 m)

Population (2010)
  - Total: 1,421
  - Density: 450/sq mi (180/km^{2})
- Time zone: UTC−5 (Eastern (EST))
  - Summer (DST): UTC−4 (EDT)
- ZIP code: 06266
- Area code: 860
- FIPS code: 09-71250
- GNIS feature ID: 2377863

South Windham (/ˈwɪndəm/ WIN-dəm) is a village and census-designated place (CDP) in Windham County, Connecticut, United States. It is located within the town of Windham. The population was 1,421 at the 2010 census.

== Geography ==
According to the United States Census Bureau, the CDP has a total area of 8.1 km^{2} (3.1 mi^{2}), of which 8.1 km^{2} (3.1 mi^{2}) is land and 0.1 km^{2} (0.04 mi^{2}) (0.96%) is water.

=== Climate ===
Climate data for Windham County, Connecticut (including University of Connecticut and Storrs, Connecticut), 1991–2020 normals, extremes 1888–present
Month	Jan	Feb	Mar	Apr	May	Jun	Jul	Aug	Sep	Oct	Nov	Dec	Year
Record high °F (°C)	68 (20)	69 (21)	83 (28)	95 (35)	93 (34)	96 (36)	101 (38)	97 (36)	97 (36)	89 (32)	82 (28)	73 (23)	101 (38)
Mean maximum °F (°C)	56.4 (13.6)	55.2 (12.9)	64.1 (17.8)	77.7 (25.4)	84.1 (28.9)	87.3 (30.7)	89.8 (32.1)	87.8 (31.0)	84.0 (28.9)	76.1 (24.5)	68.2 (20.1)	59.8 (15.4)	91.6 (33.1)
Mean daily maximum °F (°C)	35.0 (1.7)	37.2 (2.9)	44.8 (7.1)	57.0 (13.9)	67.6 (19.8)	75.6 (24.2)	80.5 (26.9)	79.1 (26.2)	72.7 (22.6)	61.3 (16.3)	50.3 (10.2)	40.1 (4.5)	58.4 (14.7)
Daily mean °F (°C)	26.9 (−2.8)	28.8 (−1.8)	36.3 (2.4)	47.5 (8.6)	57.7 (14.3)	66.3 (19.1)	71.7 (22.1)	70.0 (21.1)	63.4 (17.4)	52.1 (11.2)	42.1 (5.6)	32.7 (0.4)	49.6 (9.8)
Mean daily minimum °F (°C)	18.8 (−7.3)	20.4 (−6.4)	27.8 (−2.3)	38.0 (3.3)	47.7 (8.7)	57.0 (13.9)	62.8 (17.1)	60.9 (16.1)	54.1 (12.3)	42.9 (6.1)	34.0 (1.1)	25.3 (−3.7)	40.8 (4.9)
Mean minimum °F (°C)	−0.2 (−17.9)	3.2 (−16.0)	11.1 (−11.6)	26.6 (−3.0)	36.4 (2.4)	44.9 (7.2)	53.3 (11.8)	51.2 (10.7)	40.3 (4.6)	29.7 (−1.3)	20.0 (−6.7)	9.9 (−12.3)	−2.1 (−18.9)
Record low °F (°C)	−19 (−28)	−20 (−29)	−6 (−21)	10 (−12)	25 (−4)	35 (2)	42 (6)	37 (3)	26 (−3)	16 (−9)	1 (−17)	−17 (−27)	−20 (−29)
Average precipitation inches (mm)	3.65 (93)	2.99 (76)	4.38 (111)	4.23 (107)	3.73 (95)	4.52 (115)	4.01 (102)	4.30 (109)	4.48 (114)	4.58 (116)	3.90 (99)	4.50 (114)	49.27 (1,251)
Average snowfall inches (cm)	8.3 (21)	14.1 (36)	6.3 (16)	1.7 (4.3)	0.0 (0.0)	0.0 (0.0)	0.0 (0.0)	0.0 (0.0)	0.0 (0.0)	0.3 (0.76)	1.1 (2.8)	7.2 (18)	39.0 (99)
Average precipitation days (≥ 0.01 in)	10.2	9.0	10.2	11.3	12.7	10.9	10.5	9.5	9.0	10.6	9.1	10.4	123.4
Average snowy days (≥ 0.1 in)	3.8	4.0	2.5	0.6	0.0	0.0	0.0	0.0	0.0	0.1	0.4	2.1	13.5
Source 1: NOAA
Source 2: National Weather Service

== Demographics ==
As of the census of 2000, there were 1,278 people, 517 households, and 350 families residing in the CDP. The population density was 158.7/km^{2} (411.0/mi^{2}). There were 579 housing units at an average density of 71.9/km^{2} (186.2/mi^{2}). The racial makeup of the CDP was 95.07% White, 0.47% African American, 0.31% Native American, 0.16% Asian, 2.90% from other races, and 1.10% from two or more races. Hispanic or Latino of any race were 5.79% of the population.

There were 517 households, out of which 25.1% had children under the age of 18 living with them, 56.1% were married couples living together, 7.9% had a female householder with no husband present, and 32.3% were non-families. 23.2% of all households were made up of individuals, and 8.9% had someone living alone who was 65 years of age or older. The average household size was 2.47 and the average family size was 2.90.

In the CDP the population was spread out, with 19.4% under the age of 18, 7.8% from 18 to 24, 29.6% from 25 to 44, 29.6% from 45 to 64, and 13.6% who were 65 years of age or older. The median age was 41 years. For every 100 females, there were 101.3 males. For every 100 females age 18 and over, there were 102.4 males.

The median income for a household in the CDP was $51,282, and the median income for a family was $52,434. Males had a median income of $35,428 versus $31,944 for females. The per capita income for the CDP was $24,113. About 1.8% of families and 3.0% of the population were below the poverty line, including 4.1% of those under age 18 and none of those age 65 or over.
