= Windham Center Historic District =

Historic district in Connecticut, United States

- U.S. National Register of Historic Places
- U.S. Historic district
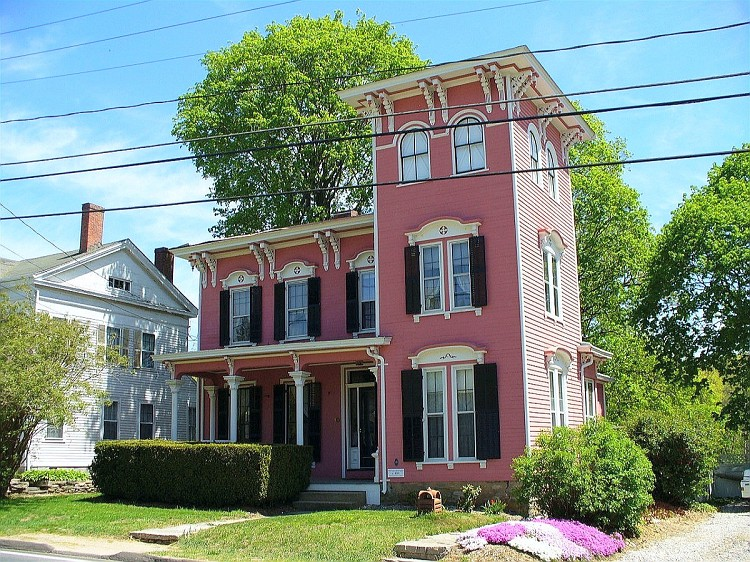
- The Laura Huntington House, c. 1850

- Location within Connecticut Location within the United States
- Location: CT 14 and CT 203, Windham, Connecticut
- Coordinates: 41°42′8″N 72°9′40″W
- Area: 205 acres (83 ha)
- Built: 1750
- Architect: Multiple
- Architectural style: Greek Revival, Colonial, Italianate
- NRHP reference No.: 79002655
- Added to NRHP: June 4, 1979

Windham Center Historic District (/ˈwɪndəm/ WIN-dəm) is a 205-acre (83 ha) area in the town of Windham, Connecticut, that is designated as a historic district. The district was listed on the National Register of Historic Places in 1979. At the time, it included 61 contributing buildings out of a total of 78 buildings, and it included 2 other contributing sites.

== General description ==
Windham Center is a village in the New England town of Windham in northeast Connecticut. The District is centered on the village green. During the town's first 125 years, this district was the most thickly settled part of the surrounding area. The village was selected as the seat of Windham County, when the latter was created in 1726, and prospered from the legal activity around the courthouse that was constructed. In the following three decades Windham Center grew to be a prosperous administrative, commercial and agricultural center.

The village green today is bordered by the Congregational Church, the Post Office, a former inn, multiple houses, and the original Greek Revival style Windham Bank (built in 1832), which was converted to the Windham Free Library in 1896. Four streets issue from the green: Scotland Rd (Route 14) to the east, Windham Center Road (Route 203) to the south, Plains Road to the west, and North Road (Routes 14 and 203) to the northwest. The village remains essentially rural.

Windham was the home of two of Connecticut's Revolutionary pioneers, Eliphalet Dyer and Jedediah Elderkin; of craftsman J. Alden Weir; and of legal scholar Zephaniah Swift. The first volume of Swift's work, A System of the Laws of the State of Connecticut (1795), was the first legal treatise in America and concerns the constitution of the state and differences between English and American common law.
