= Mary A. Ripley =

American poet (1831–1893)

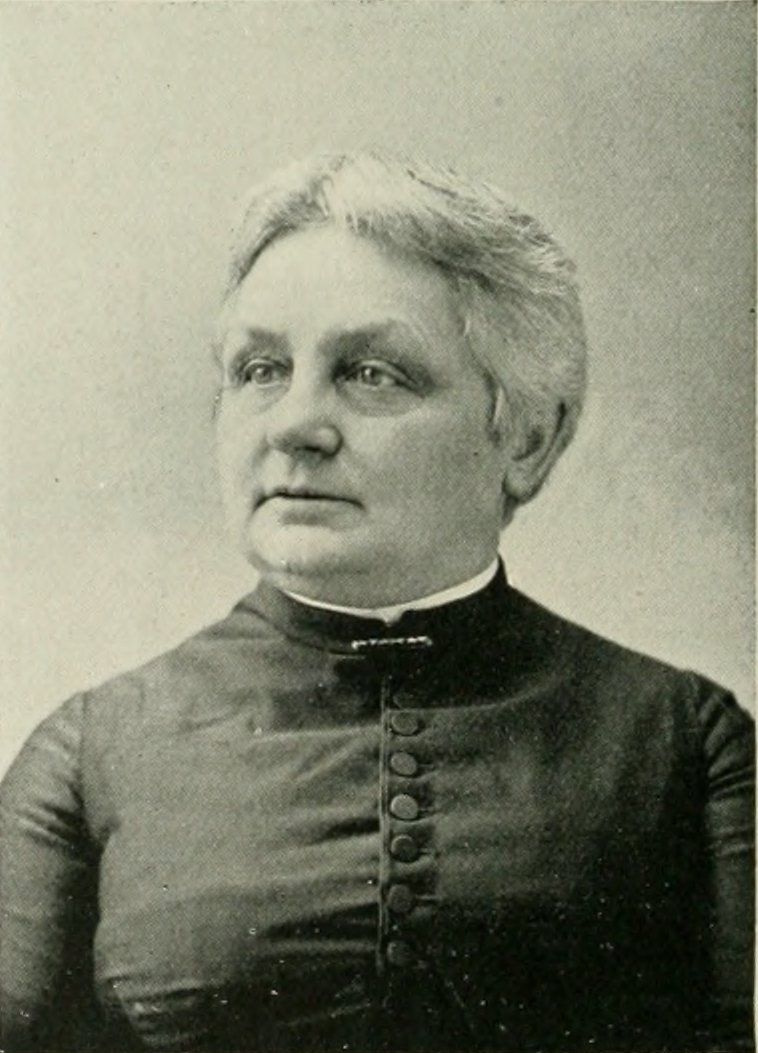
- Photo in A Woman of the Century
- Born: January 11, 1831; Windham, Connecticut, U.S.
- Died: June 3, 1893 (aged 62); Nebraska, U.S.
- Occupations: teacher; author; lecturer
- Relatives: Samuel Huntington
- Writing career
- Genres: poetry; vacation letters; essays

Mary A. Ripley (January 11, 1831 – June 3, 1893) was an American author, lecturer, and teacher. She taught in the schools of Buffalo, New York for 40 years, including 13 in the grammar schools and 27 in the high school. The Mary A. Ripley Memorial Library inside the Women's Educational and Industrial Union of Buffalo was named in her honor.

== Early life and education ==
Mary Ann Ripley was born in Windham, Connecticut, January 11, 1831. She was the daughter of John Huntington Ripley and Eliza L. Spalding Ripley. The Huntington family was prominent in New England. One of its members, Samuel Huntington, signed the Declaration of Independence and the Articles of Confederation. Ripley was, on her mother's side, of Huguenot ancestry, and was descended from the French family, D'Aubigné, anglicized into Dabney. The family, originally from Connecticut, came to Buffalo from Alden. Her mother's family name was Spaulding.

In early childhood, Ripley was studious and had literary tastes. When very young, she was already writing stories. She was educated in the country district-schools of western New York, and in the free city-schools of Buffalo.

== Career ==
When Ripley began teaching, she also had to care for an invalid mother and an infant sister. Her early career was as an assistant in primary schools. She taught in Buffalo for 40 years spending 27 years as a teacher in the Buffalo high school. It was in the management of boys that she had the most marked success. Her clear-cut distinctions between what is true and what is false, and her abhorrence of merely mechanical work, gave her a unique position in the educational history of Buffalo. In 1887, she resigned her position in the Buffalo high school on account of temporary ill health. She returned after Christmas, but resigned permanently in March 1888.

Upon retirement from her teaching career, she went to live with relatives at Kearney, Nebraska. After some rest and when her health was restored, she became a lecturer.

She was also active in good works. She held the position of State superintendent of scientific temperance instruction in public schools and colleges for Nebraska. In addition to her association with the Women's Educational and Industrial Union, Ripley was a member of the Society for the Advancement of Women, the Nebraska state branch of the Woman's Christian Temperance Union, and served as president of the 19th Century Club.

Ripley's contributions to the press were, principally, poems (characterized by vigor and sweetness), vacation letters, terse communications on questions of the day, and brief, common-sense essays, which attracted attention and exerted a wide influence. In 1867, she published a volume, Poems (Adams & Ellis; Rochester, New York, 1867); and, later, a small book entitled Exercises in Analysis and Parsing (Buffalo; Peter Paul & Brother) for school room use was issued. That was followed by Household Service, published under the auspices of the Women's Educational and Industrial Union of Buffalo.

== Death and legacy ==
Ripley died suddenly on June 3, 1893, in Kearney or Bostwick, Nebraska. She was survived by a sister, Charlotte E. Bushnell, and a niece.

=== Mary A. Ripley Memorial Library ===
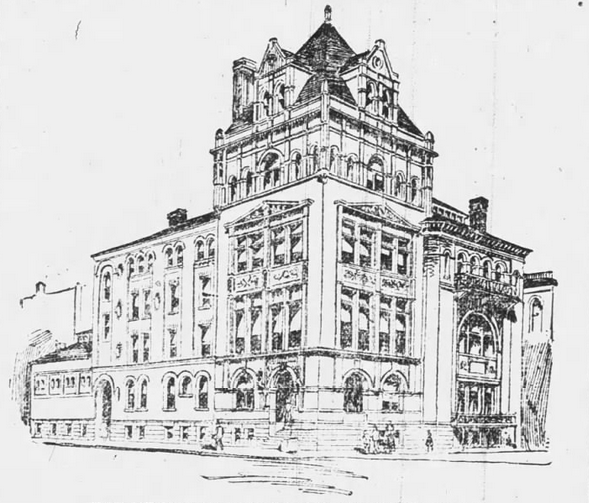
Women's Union (Buffalo, New York, 1894)

The Mary A. Ripley Memorial Library inside the Women's Educational and Industrial Union of Buffalo was named in Ripley's honor. The room was finished in cherry and was lined on three sides with bookcases. At the farther end was a mantelpiece whose paneling reached to the ceiling, and against this hung a portrait of Ripley by Rudolph Menzel. The library was furnished with leather-covered chairs and a long table. A small reading room was connected with the larger room.

== Selected works ==
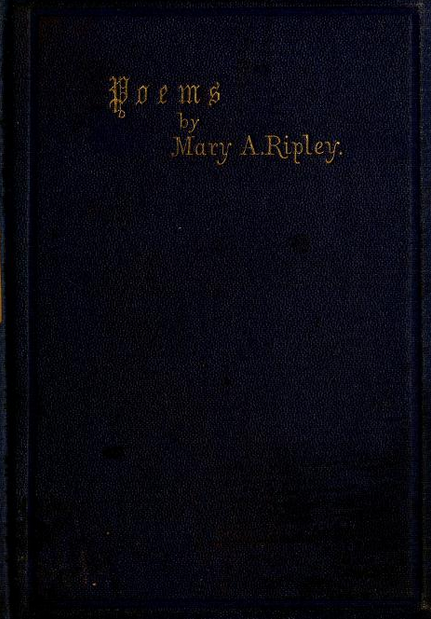
Poems (1867)

- Poems, 1867
- Exercises in Analysis and Parsing, 1878
- An Essay on Household Service: Also Legal Points and Other Matter Concerning Domestic Service : Form of Contract and Blank Receipts for Wages, 1889
