= Jennifer Gordon =

American activist

- Occupations: Professor of Law, Fordham University School of Law
- Known for: Founding the Workplace Project

Jennifer Gordon founded the Workplace Project in 1992, a non-profit worker center in Hempstead, New York, which organizes immigrant workers, mostly from Central and South America. The Workplace Project lobbied for and won a strong wage enforcement law in New York state. Gordon was the executive director of the Workplace Project from 1993 to 1998. Gordon was a MacArthur Fellow from 1999 to 2004. She is the author of Suburban Sweatshops: The Fight for Immigrant Rights, as well as several articles on immigrants, politics, and labor unions. She received a Bachelor of Arts degree from Radcliffe College of Harvard University in 1987 and a Juris Doctor degree from Harvard Law School in 1992. She is currently an associate professor at Fordham University School of Law, where she teaches courses on immigration and labor law .

== Bibliography ==
- "We Make the Road by Walking: Immigrant Workers and the Struggle for Social Change," Harvard Civil Rights - Civil Liberties Law Review. Vol 30, pg. 407. 1995.
- "Immigrants Fight the Power - Workers Centers are One Path to Labor Organizing and Political Participation". The Nation. January 3, 2000. Archived from the original on March 11, 2007 – via FindArticles.
- "American Sweatshops: Organizing workers in the Global Economy." Boston Review. Summer 2005.
- "Law, Lawyers and Labor: The United Farm Workers’ Legal Strategy in the 1960s and 1970s and the Role of Law in Union Organizing Today." Pennsylvania Journal of Labor & Employment Law. Vol. 8, Pg 1. 2005.
- Suburban Sweatshops: The Fight for Immigrant Rights. Belknap/Harvard University Press. 2005. ISBN 0-674-01524-X.
- "Transnational Labor Citizenship." Southern California Law Review. Vol. 80, pg 503. 2007.
- "Citizenship Talk: Bridging the Gap Between Race and Immigration Scholarship." (with R.A. Lenhardt). Fordham Law Review. Vol 75. pg 2493. 2007.
