= Windham Technical High School =

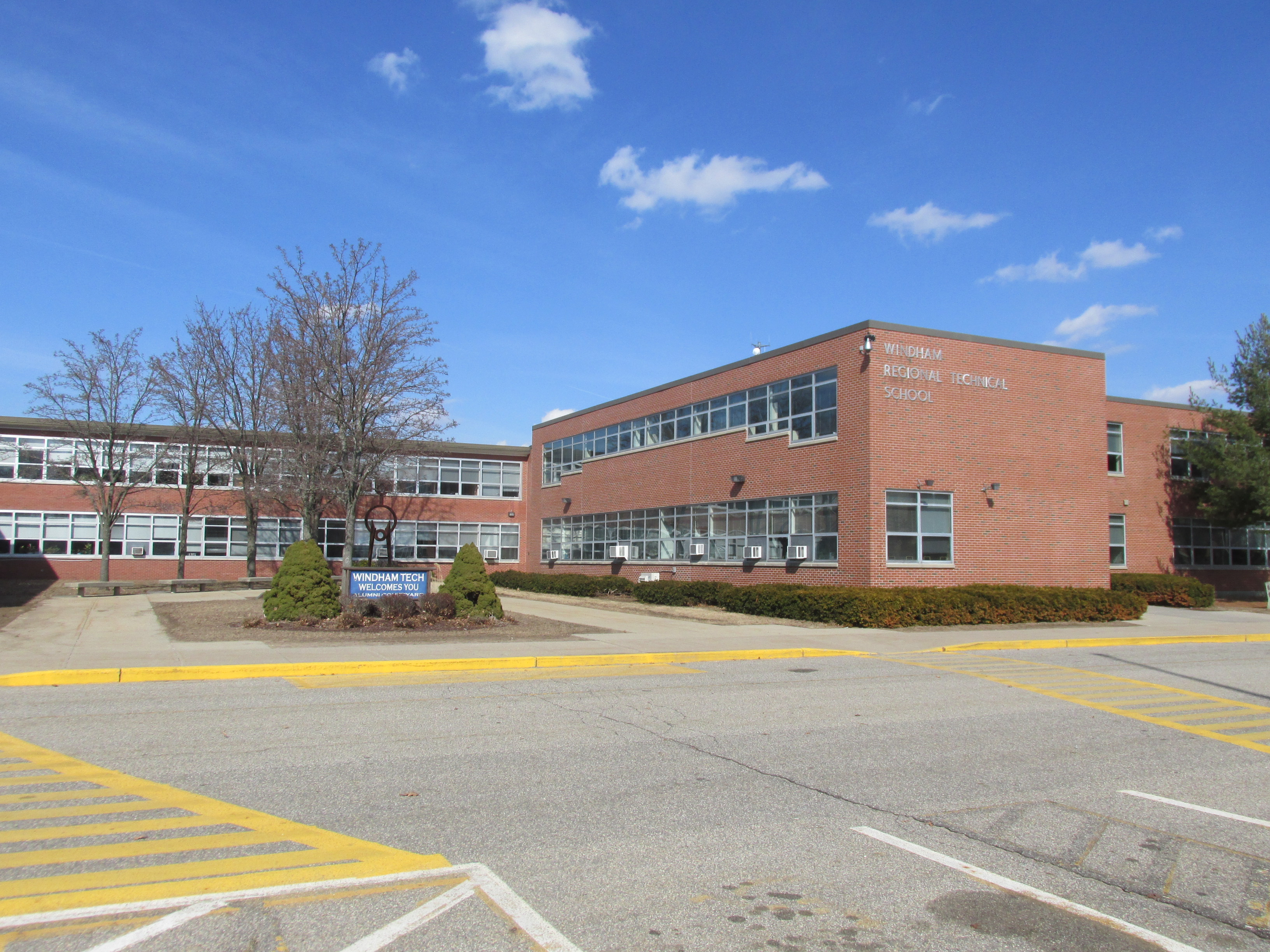

Location
- 210 Birch Street; Willimantic, Connecticut 06226; United States
- Coordinates: 41°43′12″N 72°13′16″W

Information
- CEEB code: 070935
- Principal: Eric Hilversum
- Teaching staff: 48.30 (on an FTE basis)
- Grades: 9-12
- Enrollment: 491 (2023–2024)
- Student to teacher ratio: 10.17
- Mascot: Mighty Tiger
- Website: windham.cttech.org

Windham Technical High School, or Windham Tech, is a technical high school located in Willimantic, Connecticut. It is part of the Connecticut Technical Education and Career System. In 2021–22, Windham Tech had an enrollment of 500, with boys outnumbering girls by a ratio of nearly 2:1 (326 boys and 174 girls, as of the 2021–22 school year). It is one of seventeen public technical high schools in the state of Connecticut.

The school serves students from twenty-three towns in the region. Most students come from Windham County, Tolland County (which has no technical high school of its own), and towns in the northern part of New London County. It is one of two public high schools that offer technical education in Windham County; the other is located in Danielson. Windham Tech is one of two public high schools located in Willimantic, along with Windham High School, but is not part of the Windham School District.

== Technologies ==
In addition to a complete academic program leading to a high school diploma, students attending Windham Tech may elect to receive training in one of the following trades and technologies:

- Automotive Technology
- Carpentry
- Culinary Arts
- Electrical
- Criminal Justice and Protective Services
- Heating, Ventilation & Air Conditioning (HVAC)
- Health Technology
- Information Systems Technology
- Precision Machining Technology (Manufacturing)
