= William Williams House (Lebanon, Connecticut) =

Historic house in Connecticut

- U.S. National Register of Historic Places
- U.S. National Historic Landmark
- U.S. Historic district – Contributing property
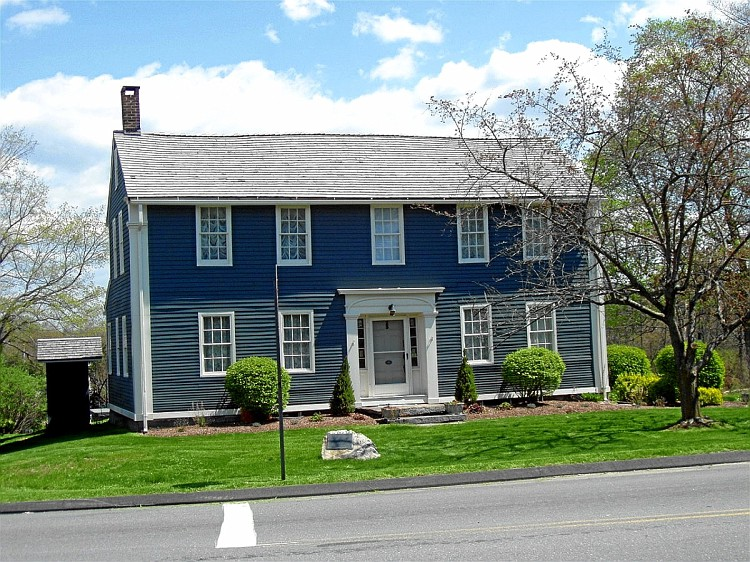
- William Williams House in 1968

- Location within Connecticut Location within the United States
- Location: Lebanon, Connecticut
- Coordinates: 41°38′9.8″N 72°12′46″W
- Area: less than one acre
- Built: by 1748
- Architectural style: Greek Revival
- Part of: Lebanon Green Historic District (ID79002666)
- NRHP reference No.: 71001012

Significant dates
- Added to NRHP: November 11, 1971
- Designated NHL: November 11, 1971
- Designated CP: June 4, 1979

The William Williams House is a historic house in Lebanon, Connecticut at the junction of Connecticut Routes 87 and 207, a National Historic Landmark. It is significant as the residence of Founding Father William Williams (1731–1811), who was a delegate from Connecticut Colony to the Continental Congress and a signer of the Declaration of Independence. Williams lived here from 1755 until his death, and it is a well-preserved and little-altered colonial-era house.

== Description and history ==
The Williams house is a 2 1/2-story wood-frame structure, five bays wide and two deep, with a side-gable roof, twin interior chimneys, and clapboard siding. Its main entrance is centered on the front façade with a Greek Revival surround, with sidelight windows and pilasters flanking the door, topped by a cornice with a carved elliptical arch. A single-story ell extends to the rear of the house. The interior follows a center hall plan and retains original features, including fireplace mantels (although most of the fireplaces have been closed up), and wide pine flooring.

The house's construction date and original owner are not known. It was purchased in 1748 by Reverend Solomon Williams, who gave it to his son William in 1755. William was born in 1731 and was trained at Harvard College, and he saw provincial militia duty in the French and Indian War in 1755. He settled in Lebanon that year, and embarked on a career as a merchant, jurist, and politician. He served in the provincial assembly 1757-1776 and the state legislature 1781–1784. He was a steadfast supporter of independence during the American Revolution, working closely with his father-in-law, Lebanon native and Governor of Connecticut Jonathan Trumbull. Williams personally funded Connecticut militia that captured Fort Ticonderoga in 1775. He was elected to the Second Continental Congress, where he signed the United States Declaration of Independence and the Articles of Confederation. He was a delegate to the 1788 state convention that ratified the United States Constitution.

Williams' house was also directly involved in the war effort during the revolution. In the winter of 1780–81, the French cavalry forces of Lauzun's Legion were stationed in Lebanon. Williams' house was allotted to Lauzun's second-in-command Robert Dillon during this time.

The house was declared a National Historic Landmark and listed on the National Register of Historic Places in 1971.

== See also ==
- List of National Historic Landmarks in Connecticut
- March Route of Rochambeau's army
- List of historic sites preserved along Rochambeau's route
- National Register of Historic Places listings in New London County, Connecticut
