= War Office (Lebanon, Connecticut) =

- U.S. National Register of Historic Places
- U.S. Historic district – Contributing property
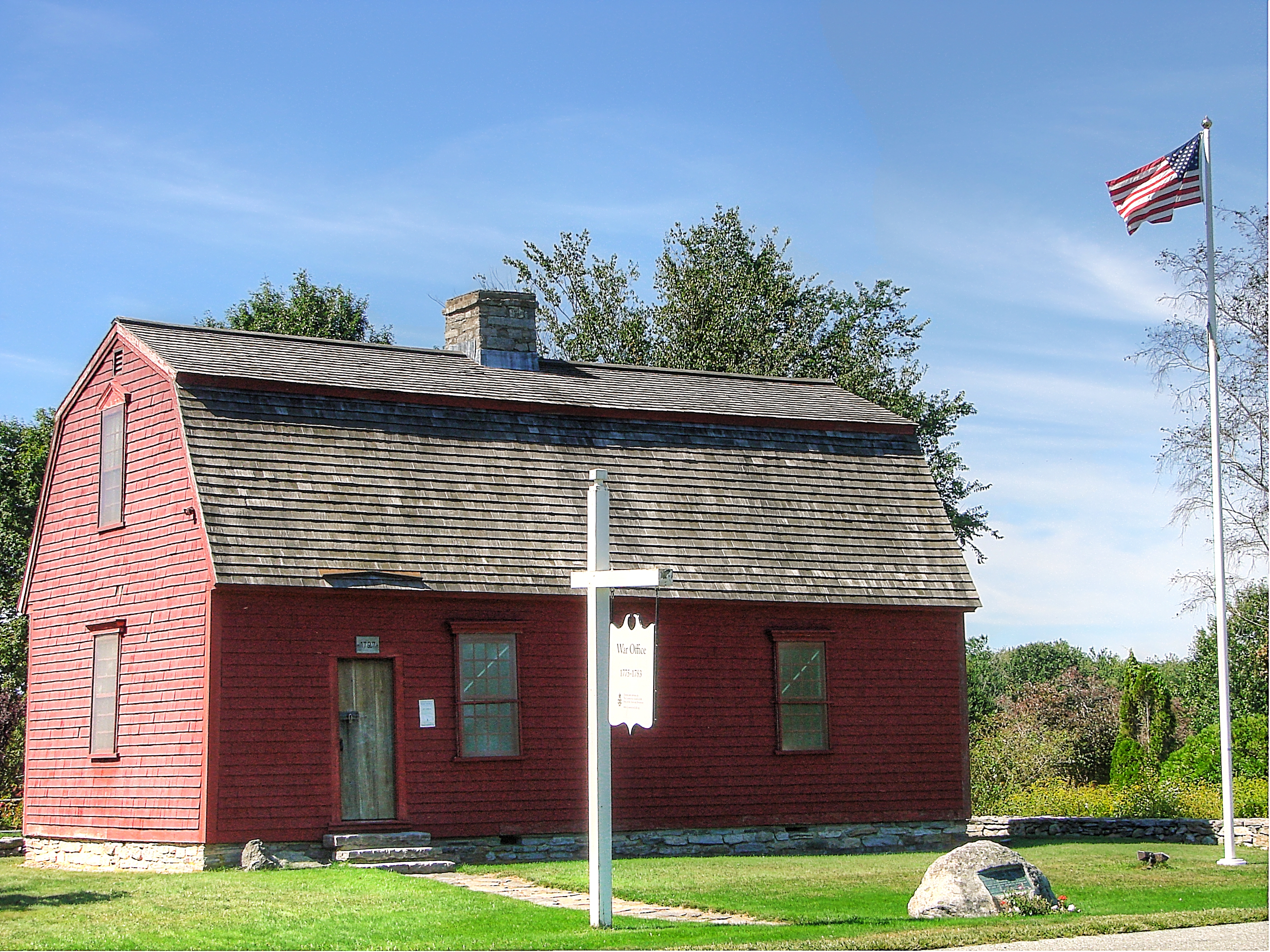

- Location within Connecticut Location within the United States
- Location: West Town Street, Lebanon, Connecticut
- Coordinates: 41°38′13″N 72°12′55″W
- Area: 0.5 acres (0.20 ha)
- Built: 1732
- Architectural style: Colonial Georgian
- Restored by: Connecticut SAR
- Website: www.sarconnecticut.org/historic-sites/trumbull-war-office/
- Part of: Lebanon Green Historic District (ID79002666)
- NRHP reference No.: 70000695

Significant dates
- Added to NRHP: October 6, 1970
- Designated CP: June 4, 1979

The War Office, also once known as the Capt. Joseph Trumble Store and Office, is a historic commercial building on the Lebanon Green in Lebanon, Connecticut, built about 1732 as a commercial building. It is most significant as the place from which Governor Jonathan Trumbull conducted military business during the American Revolutionary War. It is now part of the museum property managed by the Connecticut Society of the Sons of the American Revolution that also includes the Trumbull House and the Wadsworth Stables. The building is listed on the National Register of Historic Places since 1970.

The War Office is located facing Lebanon's elongated village green on the west side of West Town Street north of the Governor Jonathan Trumbull House, a National Historic Landmark.

== Architecture ==
The War Office is a 1½‑story timber‑frame structure built in the Colonial Georgian style typical of early‑18th‑century Connecticut mercantile buildings. Its gambrel roof, central brick chimney, and clapboard siding reflect regional adaptations intended to maximize attic storage space and improve heating efficiency. The façade’s irregular window placement suggests multiple construction phases or later modifications made to accommodate commercial use. Inside, the building retains a single‑room plan with exposed beams, wide floorboards, and a large fireplace used for heating during winter councils. The simplicity of the interior reflects its utilitarian purpose as both a merchant’s office and later a wartime administrative center.

== Early History (1732–1774) ==
Captain Joseph Trumbull, a prominent Lebanon merchant and father of Governor Jonathan Trumbull, constructed the building around 1732 as a storehouse and office for his trading operations. Lebanon’s position along inland routes connecting Norwich, Hartford, and Windham made it a natural commercial hub, and the Trumbull family operated one of the region’s most active supply networks.

The building served as a center for agricultural exchange, provisioning, and local governance. Surviving account books from the Trumbull family indicate that the office handled transactions involving livestock, grain, textiles, and imported goods.

== Revolutionary War Use (1775–1783) ==
When Jonathan Trumbull became Connecticut’s governor in 1769, he increasingly relied on the office as a secure location for military planning and logistical coordination. After the outbreak of the Revolutionary War, the building became known as the “War Office”, functioning as the governor’s de facto military headquarters.

More than 1,000 councils of war were held here, addressing troop mobilization, supply shortages, intelligence reports, and coordination with Continental Army leadership. Trumbull’s role as the only colonial governor to support the Patriot cause made the office a critical link between state and national military efforts. The War Office also served as a communications hub. Couriers arrived daily with dispatches from Washington’s headquarters, the Continental Congress, and French commanders.

The Lebanon Green was also where the French Army's cavalry wintered in 1780-81 before joining the rest of their army for the march to Yorktown, Virginia.

The War Office hosted many prominent figures of the American and French war effort. Documented visitors include:

- George Washington – meetings with Trumbull on supply coordination
- Jean‑Baptiste de Rochambeau – commander of French land forces
- Armand‑Louis de Gontaut, Duc de Lauzun – commander of Lauzun’s Legion
- Gilbert du Motier, Marquis de Lafayette – during his movements through Connecticut
- Admiral Charles-Henri-Louis d'Arsac de Ternay – commander of the French naval escort
- Generals Henry Knox, John Sullivan, and Israel Putnam
- Thomas Jefferson, Benjamin Franklin, John Adams, and John Jay – corresponded with Trumbull on wartime logistics and diplomacy

These visits underscore Lebanon’s role as a center of military planning, diplomacy, and Franco‑American coordination.

== Post‑war Decline and Preservation (1783–1891) ==
After the war, the building returned to commercial use but gradually fell into disrepair as Lebanon’s economic activity shifted. By the mid‑19th century, the structure was described in town records as “abandoned” and “in a state of decay.”

Local residents recognized its historical significance and advocated for preservation. In 1891, the building was formally transferred to the Connecticut Society of the Sons of the American Revolution, marking one of the earliest SAR preservation efforts in the nation.

== Connecticut SAR Stewardship (1891–present) ==
The Connecticut SAR stabilized the structure, restored its exterior, and opened it as a museum. Early restoration efforts focused on preserving original materials, including clapboards, beams, and flooring. Later work addressed structural reinforcement, chimney repair, and historically appropriate window restoration.

Today, the SAR maintains the War Office as part of a three‑building historic campus that includes the Governor Jonathan Trumbull House and the Wadsworth Stable.

== Role in the Washington–Rochambeau Route ==
The War Office is a documented site along the Washington–Rochambeau Revolutionary Route National Historic Trail. The Lebanon Green served as the winter quarters for Lauzun’s Legion in 1780–81, and the War Office was a key administrative center supporting French troop movements toward Yorktown.

== See also ==
- March Route of Rochambeau's army
- List of historic sites preserved along Rochambeau's route
- National Register of Historic Places listings in New London County, Connecticut
