= Lebanon Green Historic District =

Historic district in Connecticut

- U.S. National Register of Historic Places
- U.S. Historic district
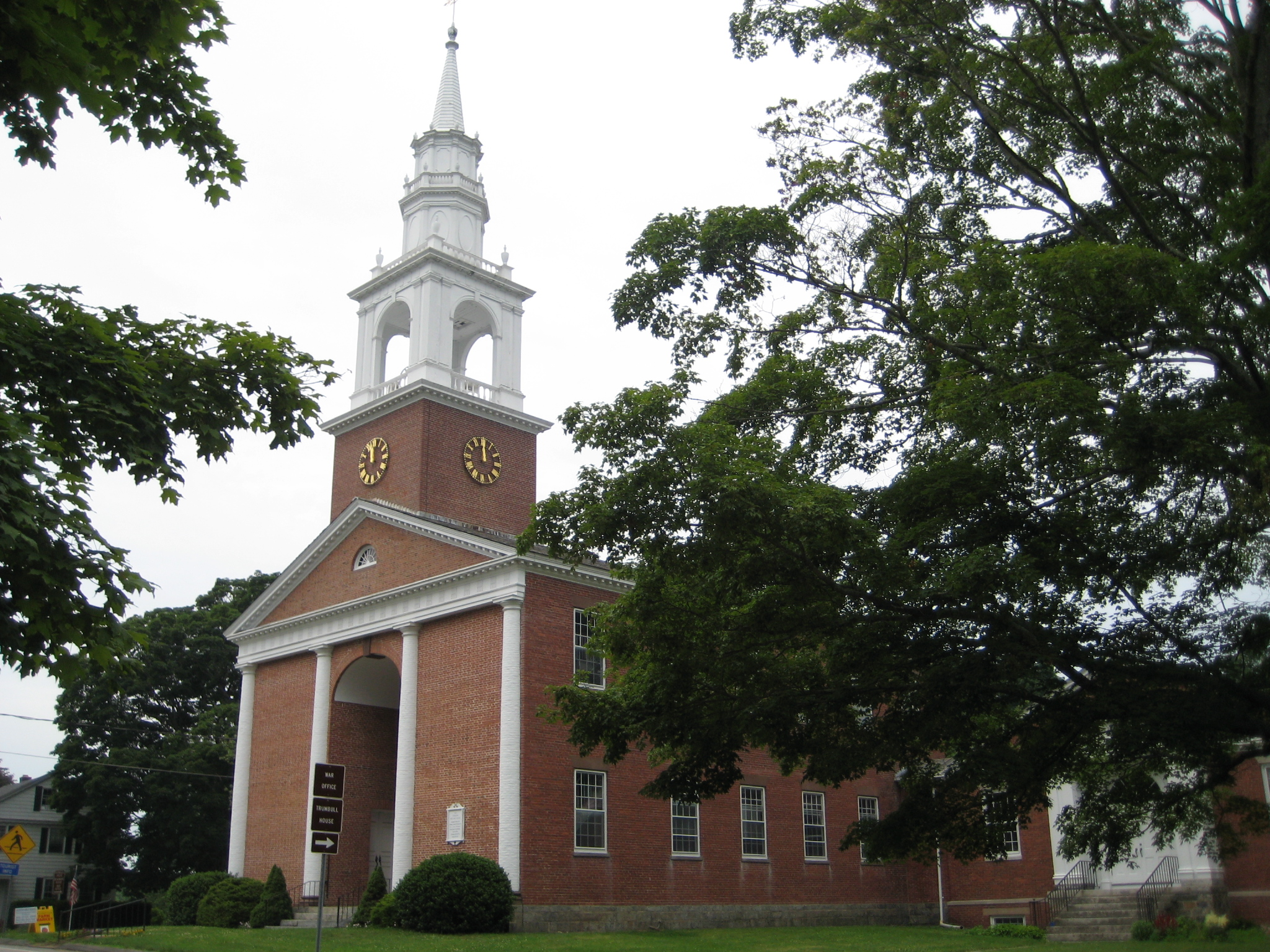

- Location within Connecticut Location within the United States
- Location: CT 87 and West Town Street, Lebanon, Connecticut
- Coordinates: 41°38′26″N 72°13′8″W
- Area: 345 acres (140 ha)
- Architect: Trumbull, John; Multiple
- Architectural style: Greek Revival, Late Victorian, Federal
- NRHP reference No.: 79002666
- Added to NRHP: June 04, 1979

The Lebanon Green Historic District encompasses the historic town center of Lebanon, Connecticut. It extends along the mile-long town green, including historic buildings that face it and a few on nearby streets. The green is bounded on its north by Connecticut Route 87 and on the south by West Town Street, and extends from a junction with Connecticut Route 289 to a triangular point south of Connecticut Route 207. The district includes a number of prominent civic and religious buildings, including the town hall, library, and Congregational church, although these are all 20th century buildings. Prominent buildings include the National Historic Landmark John Trumbull Birthplace, William Williams House, and the 1730 War Office, in which many meetings of the state's military council were held during the American Revolutionary War. The district was listed on the National Register of Historic Places in 1979. The Alden Tavern Site (now a parking lot, but recognized for its archaeological potential) is a contributing property.

The town of Lebanon was incorporated in 1700, and the area that became the green was settled by Joseph Trumble in 1704. He raised cattle and operated a store, whose 1730 building became the War Office. The green's expanse of grassy meadows is a rare surviving example of an 18th-century town common in Connecticut. In addition to the buildings associated with the prominent Trumbull family, several are also associated with the family of William A. Buckingham, who was governor during the American Civil War. The civic buildings are clustered near its southern end, while the sides are lined mainly by residences in 18th and 19th-century vernacular styles.

== See also ==
- National Register of Historic Places listings in New London County, Connecticut
