= Trumbull Cemetery (Lebanon, Connecticut) =

Cemetery in Lebanon, Connecticut, United States

Coordinates: 41.6441°N 72.2037°W

The Trumbull Cemetery (also known as the Old Cemetery) is an historic cemetery in Lebanon, Connecticut, United States.

== Notable burials ==
- Jonathan Trumbull (1710–1785), governor of Connecticut during the American Revolution.
- Jonathan Trumbull Jr. (1740–1809), governor of Connecticut.
- William Williams (1731–1811), signatory to the United States Declaration of Independence.
- James Fitch (1622–1702), colonial minister.
