= Joseph Trumbull =

Joseph Trumbull may refer to:

- Joseph Trumbull (commissary general) (1737–1778), Connecticut army officer in the American Revolution
- Joseph Trumbull (governor) (1782–1861), U.S. Governor of Connecticut
