= Alden Tavern Site =

- U.S. National Register of Historic Places
- U.S. Historic district – Contributing property
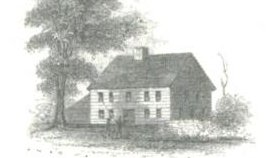
- Sketch of the Alden Tavern

- Location within Connecticut Location within the United States
- Location: 777-873 Norwich-Hartford Turnpike, Lebanon, Connecticut
- Coordinates: 41°38′14″N 72°12′47″W
- Area: 0.5 acres (0.20 ha)
- Built: 1738; 288 years ago
- Architectural style: Fieldstone foundations
- Part of: Lebanon Green Historic District (ID79002666)
- NRHP reference No.: 98000361

Significant dates
- Added to NRHP: April 13, 1998
- Designated CP: June 4, 1979

Alden Tavern Site is a historic site in Lebanon, Connecticut. The tavern was built in 1738 and owned by Captain Alden. Legend holds that Alden once horsewhipped British General Richard Prescott, commander of the British troops of Rhode Island, when he dined at the tavern. The site was added to the National Register of Historic Places in 1998 and listed under the "Event" and "Information Potential" criteria. It was listed as having only fieldstone foundations remaining. A parking lot was paved over the site in 2010, adding 26 paved spaces and 70 spaces in overflow parking on a grass field. It is now known as the Alden Tavern Parking Lot by the town of Lebanon.

== Owners ==
Captain Alden was the tavern's proprietor during the American Revolutionary War. Around 1850, it was owned by a man named Wattles who was a descendant of Alden. The fate of the tavern is unknown, but the site where it stood was part of the Lebanon town green by the 1903 publication of Butterworth's book Brother Jonathan.

== Historical significance ==
According to local legend, Captain Alden had an altercation with British General Richard Prescott, commander of the British troops of Rhode Island, during the American Revolutionary War. Prescott had been captured and was being escorted to General George Washington's headquarters, but on the trip he stopped at Alden's tavern. Several books detail different accounts and portrayals of the exchanges which led to Prescott's whipping, all involving Prescott being served "the common dish of corn and beans" (called succotash) and throwing the food on the floor. According to one published account, Prescott threw the food on the floor and cried out, "Do you give me the pigs' feed?" There is no direct contemporaneous evidence to verify the story, but it persists today as a likely legend.

== Alden Tavern Parking Lot ==
The site was added to the National Register of Historic Places on April 13, 1998, and it was noted that only fieldstone foundations remained. It was listed under the "Event" and "Information Potential" criteria with a period of significance between 1700 and 1874. The property is also listed as a contributing property for the Lebanon Green Historic District.

The Alden Tavern site is now a parking lot on town-owned property adjacent to Lebanon's Community Center. A phase 2 archaeological survey was completed before the project began, and a notice for this survey was published in 2003. The town received a Small Town Economic Assistance Program grant for $250,000 to construct the parking lot. Coit Excavating won the contract with the lowest bid of $193,000 and began construction in April 2010. The paved parking lot has 26 spots, with 70 more for overflow in a grass field. On December 6, 2011, the Lebanon Selectmen dissolved the committee because the project was successfully completed. It is now known as the Alden Tavern Parking Lot.

== See also ==
- National Register of Historic Places listings in New London County, Connecticut
