= John Trumbull Birthplace =

Historic house in Connecticut, United States

- U.S. National Register of Historic Places
- U.S. National Historic Landmark
- U.S. Historic district – Contributing property
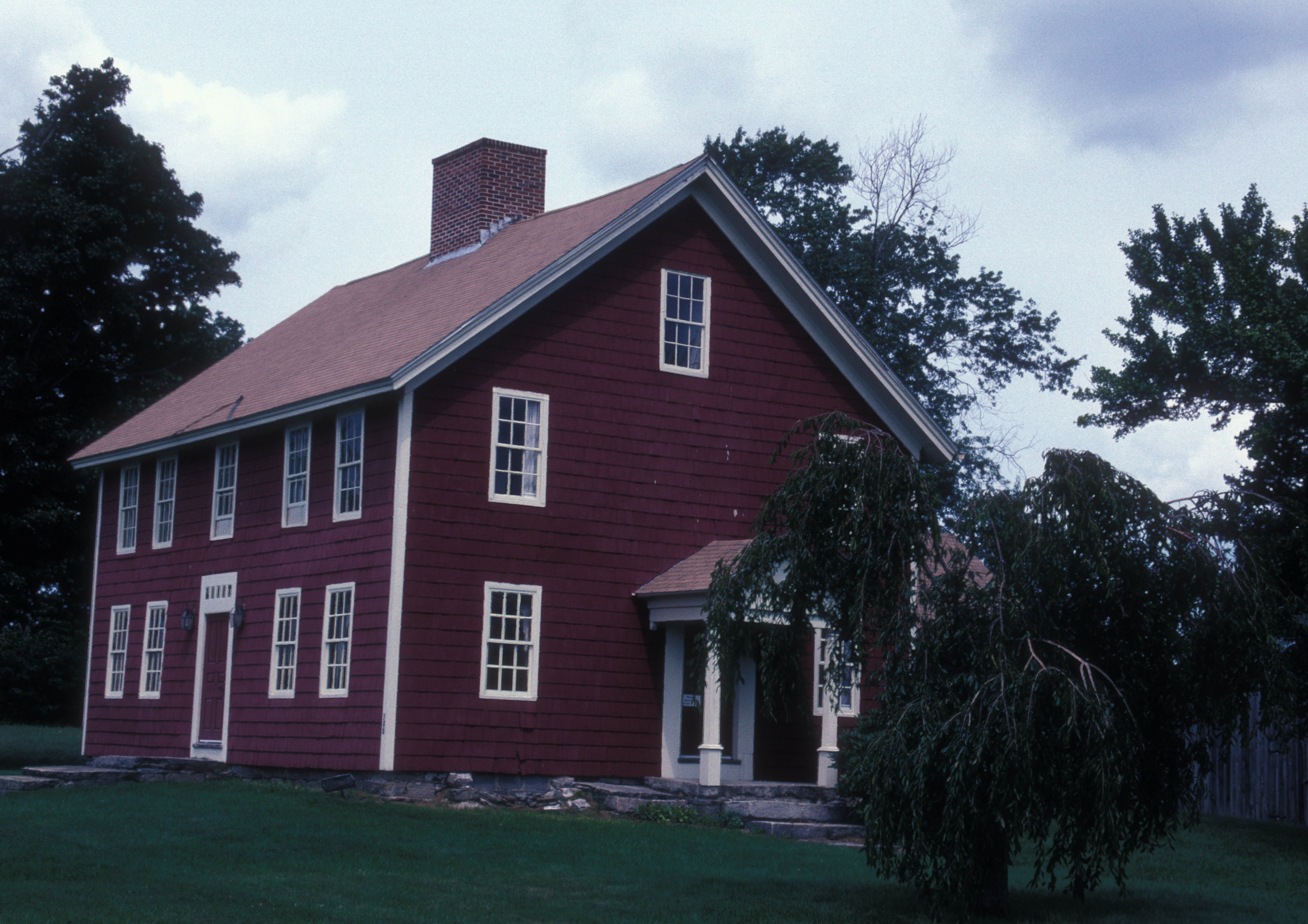

- Location within Connecticut Location within the United States
- Location: Town Common, Lebanon, Connecticut
- Coordinates: 41°38′10″N 72°12′56″W
- Area: 3 acres (1.2 ha)
- Built: 1735
- Architectural style: Georgian
- Part of: Lebanon Green Historic District (ID79002666)
- NRHP reference No.: 66000883

Significant dates
- Added to NRHP: October 15, 1966
- Designated NHL: December 21, 1965
- Designated CP: June 4, 1979

The John Trumbull Birthplace, also known as the Governor Jonathan Trumbull House, is a historic house museum on the Lebanon Green in Lebanon, Connecticut, built in 1735 by Joseph Trumbull as a wedding present for his son Jonathan (1710–1785). The house was a center of political and military strategy during the American Revolutionary War, when Jonathan Trumbull was Governor of Connecticut. It was also the birthplace of John Trumbull (1756–1843), an artist known for his depictions of the war and its people. The house was designated a National Historic Landmark in 1965.

== Description ==
The house is a 2 1/2-story wood-frame structure, five bays wide, with a side-gable roof, wooden clapboard siding, and a large central chimney. Its centered entrance is flanked by fluted pilasters and topped by a transom window and an entablature. Two ells extend back from the house, joining it to another small cottage used as a caretaker's residence. The first floor of the interior is divided into a parlor, dining room, and bedroom, with a kitchen and pantry in the ell. The second floor has bedrooms and a secret "bolthole" chamber which Governor Trumbull used as an office. The house includes a selection of Trumbull possessions, as well as other period items.

== History ==
Joseph Trumbull built the house in 1735 when his son Jonathan married Faith Robinson. Jonathan Trumbull was elected governor of the Connecticut Colony in 1769 and became the first governor of the State of Connecticut in 1776. He was also a merchant, managing his affairs from this house. Many meetings took place in his home during the years of the American Revolutionary War (1775–1783), as well as in the adjacent War Office. The War Office was originally connected to the house by a passage, and it functioned as a major logistical center for the northern states.

A troop of French Army cavalry was stationed on the Lebanon Green during the winter of 1780–1781, and these troops joined those of the Comte de Rochambeau when he marched through in 1781 on their way to join George Washington and the Continental Army prior to the Siege of Yorktown.

John Trumbull was born in the house June 6, 1756. He served as an aide to George Washington in the war and became an artist. He was commissioned by Congress in the 19th century to paint four of the eight historical paintings that adorn the United States Capitol rotunda. He also painted portraits of many of the war's military leaders.

In 1830, the house was moved several hundred feet to its present location. The Connecticut chapter of the Daughters of the American Revolution purchased the property in 1934 and have operated it since then as a historic house museum. The property is open to the public on weekends from May through October.

The house was declared a National Historic Landmark in 1965 and listed on the National Register of Historic Places in 1966.

== See also ==
- List of National Historic Landmarks in Connecticut
- March Route of Rochambeau's army
- List of historic sites preserved along Rochambeau's route
- National Register of Historic Places listings in New London County, Connecticut
