= Jonathan the Husky =

College sports team mascot

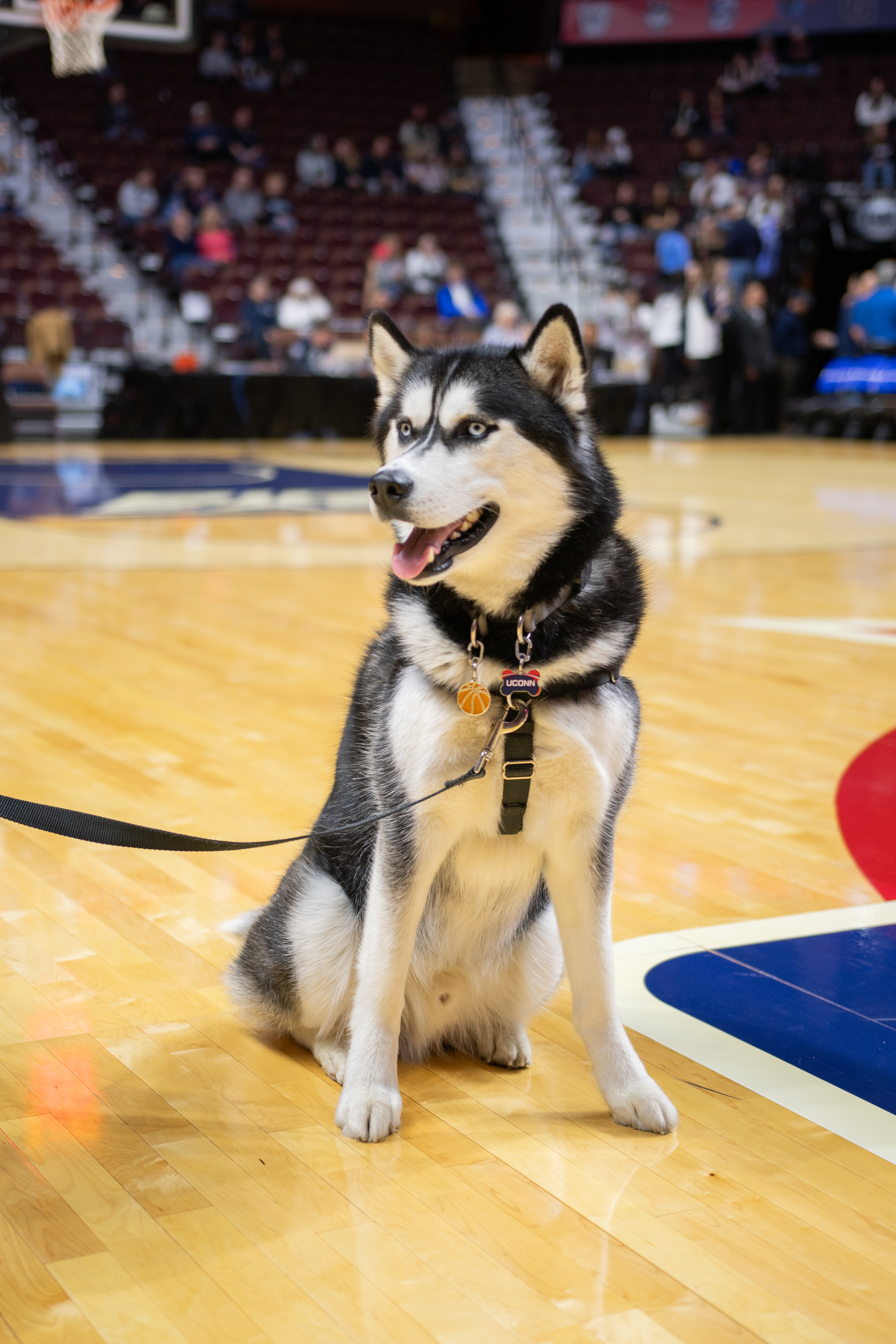
Jonathan XV, UConn's current live mascot

Jonathan the Husky is the mascot of the University of Connecticut. All of UConn's huskies are named Jonathan in honor of Jonathan Trumbull, the last colonial and first state Governor of Connecticut. (There have been two other governors of Connecticut with similar names: Jonathan Trumbull Jr. (1797–1809) and John H. Trumbull (1925–1931). The student body president at the time of the mascot naming later cited the name of the mascot as coming from the most recent Governor Trumbull, a near contemporary.) Traditionally, there are two Jonathan mascots: one is a student in a costume which resembles the university's Athletics logo, and the other is a live husky canine.

All but the first real husky mascot, a brown and white dog, had been solid white with one brown eye and one blue eye, until 2013 when UConn officially changed their logo to a black and white Husky. The newest Jonathan is Jonathan XV, a black and white male introduced June 28, 2023. Jonathan is one of the few university mascots in the nation to have been selected by students via a popular poll (in 1933).

The co-ed service fraternity Alpha Phi Omega has helped to care for the canine Jonathan since 1970 when the Student Government wanted to get rid of the mascot.

== Jonathan I ==
In 1934 Rhode Island's ram mascot was kidnapped and the story gained interest in bringing a live animal mascot to Connecticut State College. A student poll selected the husky to be the college's mascot and thus, in January 1935, Connecticut State College's first husky mascot arrived at the campus in Storrs. Jonathan I's grandfather had accompanied Robert Peary on an expedition to the North Pole. The Alumnus had announced a "Name the Mascot Contest" and "Jonathan" was the winning entry. The day before the name was announced Jonathan I was struck by a vehicle in North Windham. Jonathan I was able to attend a few basketball games at the Willis Nichols Hawley Armory before his passing. He is buried by the Old Whitney granite step and a plaque commemorates his life.

== Jonathan II ==
Jonathan II debuted November 8, 1935, at a pep rally prior to the annual football rivalry game against Rhode Island. Jonathan II was an Eskimo Husky, and cousin to the original Jonathan. Jonathan made his presence felt in September 1936. He scared Brown University's live bear mascot severely and chased the bear up a tree. Jonathan II made Brown's bear so timid, it refused to leave the tree. The bear had to be rescued from the tree by Providence police and fire fighters.

== Jonathan III ==
Jonathan III made his debut November 8, 1947, against Rhode Island in football. Jonathan III is best known for chasing Yale's bulldog mascot around the Yale Bowl. Other sources claim that Handsome Dan VI growled when introduced to Jonathan III, but turned and fled when Jonathan stepped closer. Before arriving in Storrs, Jonathan traveled to Antarctica to assist Admiral Richard E. Byrd with Operation Highjump during the winter of 1946 to 1947. Bob Steiner, considered the most famous of husky trainers, would break an area of ice on campus's Mirror Lake for Jonathan to enjoy a cool swim in. He was also dog-napped prior to a football game.

== Jonathan IV ==
Jonathan IV arrived on campus in 1949. He was a Siberian-Eskimo-Samoyed mix with greyish markings. His first football game was against Yale, and he bit their bulldog mascot on the nose. In 1951, Jonathan IV traveled to Madison Square Garden, NYC in to accompany the men's basketball team in their first NCAA tournament appearance. While there he received a standing ovation after abruptly running onto the court. Jonathan IV was not a big fan of opposing basketball players and was known to growl when points were scored against UConn.

== Jonathan V ==
Jonathan V made his appearance as the UConn mascot in 1959. However, he was not able to handle the noise and commotion of large crowds. This made appearances at football games unpleasant for Jonathan V, where he would roll onto his back and moan at the loud noises. News reports refer to Jonathan V as "shell shocked". Jonathan V was retired in 1963. UConn introduced a man in a husky costume mascot to serve as an interim mascot known as "Homer the Husky". Pictures from the period show human mascot outfits have vastly changed for UConn since this time.

== Jonathan VI ==
Just two months after being introduced to campus, Jonathan VI died after being hit by a car.

== Jonathan VII ==
In March 1965, Jonathan VII came to campus as a gift from the student body of the University of Alaska. The University of Alaska wanted to repay UConn for their assistance following a devastating earthquake in Alaska. The beautiful all-white husky almost became the last animal mascot for UConn. He wore a dog tag labeled "Number One," serving as a symbol for the Town Clerk's annual dog registration campaign. 1970, the Student Senate voted to sell the mascot because the dog "represented the establishment." UConn was a hotbed of anti-Vietnam fervor, like most college campuses of the time. 2,500 students petitioned support for Jonathan, which successfully saved the mascot by overriding the Student Senate. Jonathan VII was turned over to Alpha Phi Omega, the service fraternity, for handling. Before retiring, Jonathan VII's final football game was in 1977. As a reward for his life-long, model service to UConn, Jonathan VII was honored with the title "Mascot Emeritus." He died at the age of 14 and a half and is buried near Jonathan I at the Old Whitney Granite Step.

== Jonathan VIII ==
As Jonathan VII was being retired, the university was introducing Jonathan VIII. Finally, in 1989, university trustees officially recognized the Husky dog as the official mascot of UConn athletics. Jonathan VIII lived on the farm of Richard Rogers, a retired army officer living in Willington. He was said to shy away from men but loved the company of women. Jonathan VIII died of cancer in May 1991.

The original Jonathan VIII was brought to campus in 1970 and died shortly after being hit by a car. Jonathan VII then continued as the sole mascot until 1977 when the name Jonathan VIII was re-used.

== Jonathan IX or Jonathan X ==
Jonathan IX arrived on campus in July 1991, and began his stay with Alpha Phi Omega. However, before his debut to the student body, the fraternity stated the husky was not Jonathan IX but actually Jonathan X. Alpha Phi Omega's theory was that two huskies served as Jonathan VIII and the mascot's name needed to reflect this. There are no public records to dispute or verify this claim but it is the claim given by the university in publications and on tours. In 2023, a university news director clarified that the original Jonathan VIII was brought to campus in 1970 and died shortly after being hit by a car. Jonathan VII then continued as the sole mascot until 1977 when the second Jonathan VIII arrived on campus. Another theory on campus states that students of Clubhouse 29 found a stray pup on the streets and took him in. After being informed it was Jonathan IX they refused to give the pup back to Alpha Phi Omega. The fraternity mobilized and was able to find another husky in time, Jonathan X. Even though it is unclear what the truth is surrounding Jonathan X, he served the university dutifully. Jonathan X is notable for having one blue eye and one brown eye, known as Heterochromia iridum. Tragically Jonathan X was struck by a vehicle and died in 1995.

== Jonathan XI ==
Jonathan XI arrived with about as much momentum a husky pup can arrive on campus. He made his debut 2 weeks after the unveiling of the majestic husky dog statue, and a month after the UConn Women's basketball team won its first NCAA National Championship. Jonathan XI retired in 2001 but continued to represent UConn in a positive manner by participating in an animal therapy program.

== Jonathan XII ==
Jonathan XII made his debut in 2001. He continued the UConn tradition of being a majestically brilliant all white husky that was cared for by Alpha Phi Omega. Jonathan XII was unable to deal with large crowds, and seemed stressed with being surrounded by large crowds. This became an issue because of UConn growing athletic prowess at the time. During Jonathan XII's tenure, UConn football became a Division I-A football team that played at a 40,000-seat stadium. UConn men's basketball won their second National Championship, and UConn Women's basketball won 3 more National Championships (2001, 2003, and 2004). All of the heightened interest caused Jonathan XII distress, so he was retired.

== Jonathan XIII ==
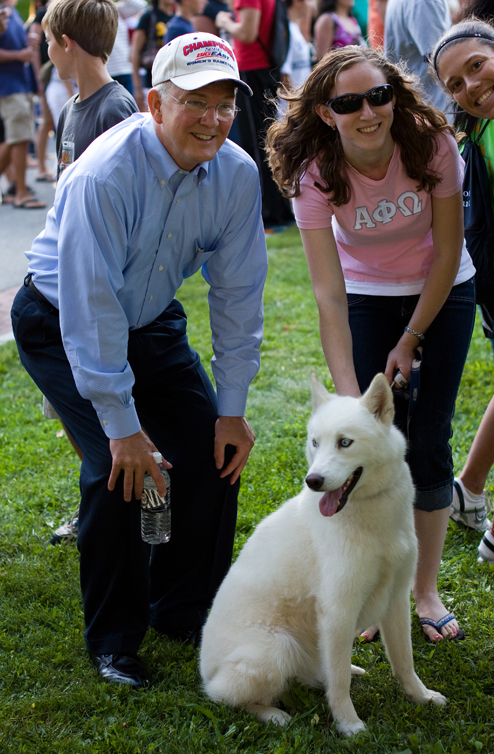
The canine Jonathan XIII with former president of UConn, Michael Hogan

Jonathan XIII was a rambunctious pup born in Hartstown, Pennsylvania. After being selected to carry on the tradition of the UConn Husky, he received training at Connecticut K-9 and Behavioral Services in Watertown, CT.

Jonathan XIII made his debut March 9, 2008, and helped guide the men to victory over Cincinnati. The delay in bringing in a new husky mascot was due to Alpha Phi Omega revamping their policies of caring for Jonathan. Further, a professional handler was brought in to work with Jonathan full-time. Other policies included a vetting process to show that Jonathan could handle large crowds and loud noise. In October 2019, post-retirement Jonathan XIII experienced a series of seizures, and a campaign to raise fund for his veterinary bills was held. The campaign produced a surplus that was donated Pieper Memorial Veterinary Hospital to help families in need pay for their pet's care. Jonathan XIII died on August 4, 2021, at the age of 14.

== Jonathan XIV ==
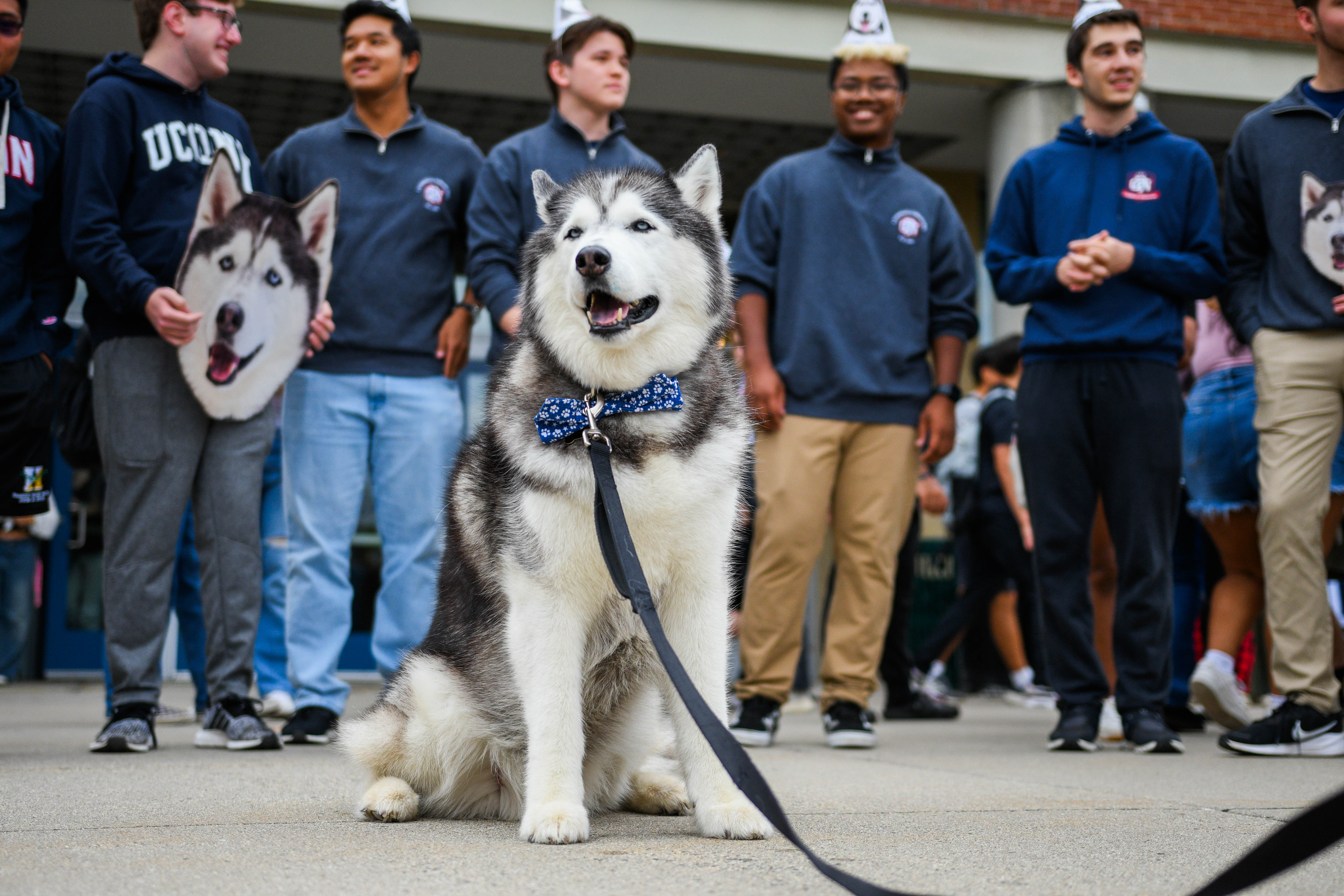
Jonathan XIV at his 11th birthday party, the first after his retirement.

Jonathan XIV was born October 5, 2013, in El Dorado, Arkansas. He has the more traditional black and white coat, with blue eyes, to reflect UConn's recent change in their mascot logo.

Jonathan XIII and XIV made joint appearances for several months before the transition was completed. After Jonathan XIII's veterinary emergency in late 2019, both Jonathans were again frequently photographed together on XIV's official Facebook page, particularly to build morale on campus during the COVID-19 pandemic. Jonathan XIV was officially retired as the mascot on March 3, 2024.

== Jonathan XV ==
Jonathan XV was born on April 19, 2023, in Ontario, Canada, and was introduced to campus on June 28, 2023. The third mascot to wear a non-all white coat, Jonathan XV is distinct in having a stripe of black fur surrounding his eyes, closely resembling the UConn athletics logo. He made appearances alongside Jonathan XIV until the former's official retirement on March 3, 2024.

== Jonathan's likenesses ==
- In 1995 a statue of Jonathan by Larry Waisele was installed at the Wolff Family Park outside of Gampel Pavilion.
- In 2010, Jonathan's image was made into a corn maze at Lyman Orchards farm in Middlefield, Connecticut

== See also ==
- List of individual dogs
