= Board of War =

American colonial-era committee responsible for managing the Continental Army

Board of War and Ordnance
- Seal of the United States Board of War and Ordnance, note Phrygian cap

Committee overview
- Formed: January 24, 1776; 250 years ago
- Dissolved: February 7, 1781; 245 years ago
- Superseding Committee: United States Department of War

The Board of War, also known as the Board of War and Ordnance, was created by the Second Continental Congress as a special standing committee to oversee the American Continental Army's administration and to make recommendations regarding the army to Congress. On January 24, 1776, Congressional delegate Edward Rutledge, echoing General George Washington's own concerns, suggested that a war office similar to Great Britain's be established. Pressure from Washington and the large volume of military business led Congress to establish the Board of War and Ordnance on June 12, 1776. Five delegates of Congress, initially John Adams, Roger Sherman, Benjamin Harrison, James Wilson, and Edward Rutledge, assisted by a permanent secretary, Richard Peters, composed the Board of War. They assumed the prescribed responsibilities for compiling a master roster of all Continental Army officers; monitoring returns of all troops, arms, and equipment; maintaining correspondence files; and securing prisoners of war. The Board of War began functioning on June 21, 1776.

Organization of the Board of War underwent several significant changes after its inception. The original board could not keep pace with the volume of work, and in early April 1777 it recommended its own replacement by a permanent administrative body. On October 17, 1777, Congress approved a plan that called for a Board of War consisting of three permanent members—men who were not members of Congress—plus a clerical staff. Congress also expanded the board's duties. In addition to the administrative functions of its predecessor, the new board's responsibilities included supervising recruitment and producing weapons. It was to act as Congress' sole official intermediary in dealing with the Army and the states on military affairs. On November 7, 1777, Quartermaster General Thomas Mifflin, Adjutant General Timothy Pickering, and Robert Hanson Harrison, Washington's military secretary, were elected as members, although Harrison promptly declined. Mifflin persuaded Congress to expand the board to five members, which it did on November 24, and recommended Richard Peters (the permanent secretary of the old board) and Maj. Gen. Horatio Gates for the new vacancies. Congress appointed both men and named former Commissary General Joseph Trumbull to replace Harrison. At Mifflin's suggestion, Gates was named president of the board. Robert Troup served as Secretary to the Board of War from February 1778 until its dissolution.

Various modifications to the structure and duties of the Board of War continued to be made throughout the war. For example, on October 29, 1778, Congress again modified the membership of the Board to now include two members of Congress and three permanent commissioners, and the Departments of the Quartermaster General and Commissaries General of Purchases and Issues were placed under the direction of the board on November 25, 1779.
