= Henry Strong McCall =

American lawyer (1819–1893)

- Born: February 14, 1819; Lebanon, Connecticut, U.S.
- Died: March 19, 1893 (aged 74); Albany, New York, U.S.
- Education: Yale College
- Occupations: Lawyer; writer; educator
- Spouse: Rhoda W. Peaslee (m. 1849)
- Children: 3

Henry Strong McCall (February 14, 1819 – March 19, 1893) was an American lawyer and writer. He was known for his legal writings.

== Early life ==
Henry Strong McCall was born on February 14, 1819, in Lebanon, Connecticut, as the fifth son to Melissa (née Hale) and Henry McCall. He was a descendant of John Strong of Northampton, Massachusetts. He graduated from Yale College in 1842. He then moved to Albany, New York, where he taught at and was principal of the Boys' Collegiate Institute until February 1847. He was admitted to the bar on May 14, 1847.

== Career ==
In 1847, McCall was Albany County's superintendent of schools. He practiced law in Albany. He was city attorney of Albany from January 1854 to May 13, 1856. Starting in 1879, he was a lecturer at Albany Law School.

McCall helped found the First Congregational Church of Albany in 1850 and served as its clerk.

== Works ==
McCall published a number of legal works, including:

- Notes to the New York Code of Civil Procedure (1851)
- Precedents, or Practical Forms in Actions at Law (1852, 1868, 1871)
- The Clerk's Assistant (1860, 1866, 1873)
- The Constable's Guide (1862)
- New York Civil and Criminal Justice (1865, 1873)
- Real Property (1883)

== Personal life ==
McCall married Rhoda W. Peaslee, daughter of Ebenzer Peaslee, of Bridgeport, New York, on May 10, 1849. They had two daughters and one son, including Henry Strong Jr.

In the summer of 1885, he had a stroke that caused him to lose the ability to speak. He had a second stroke and died on March 19, 1893, at his home in Albany.
