= Joseph Trumbull (commissary general) =

American politician

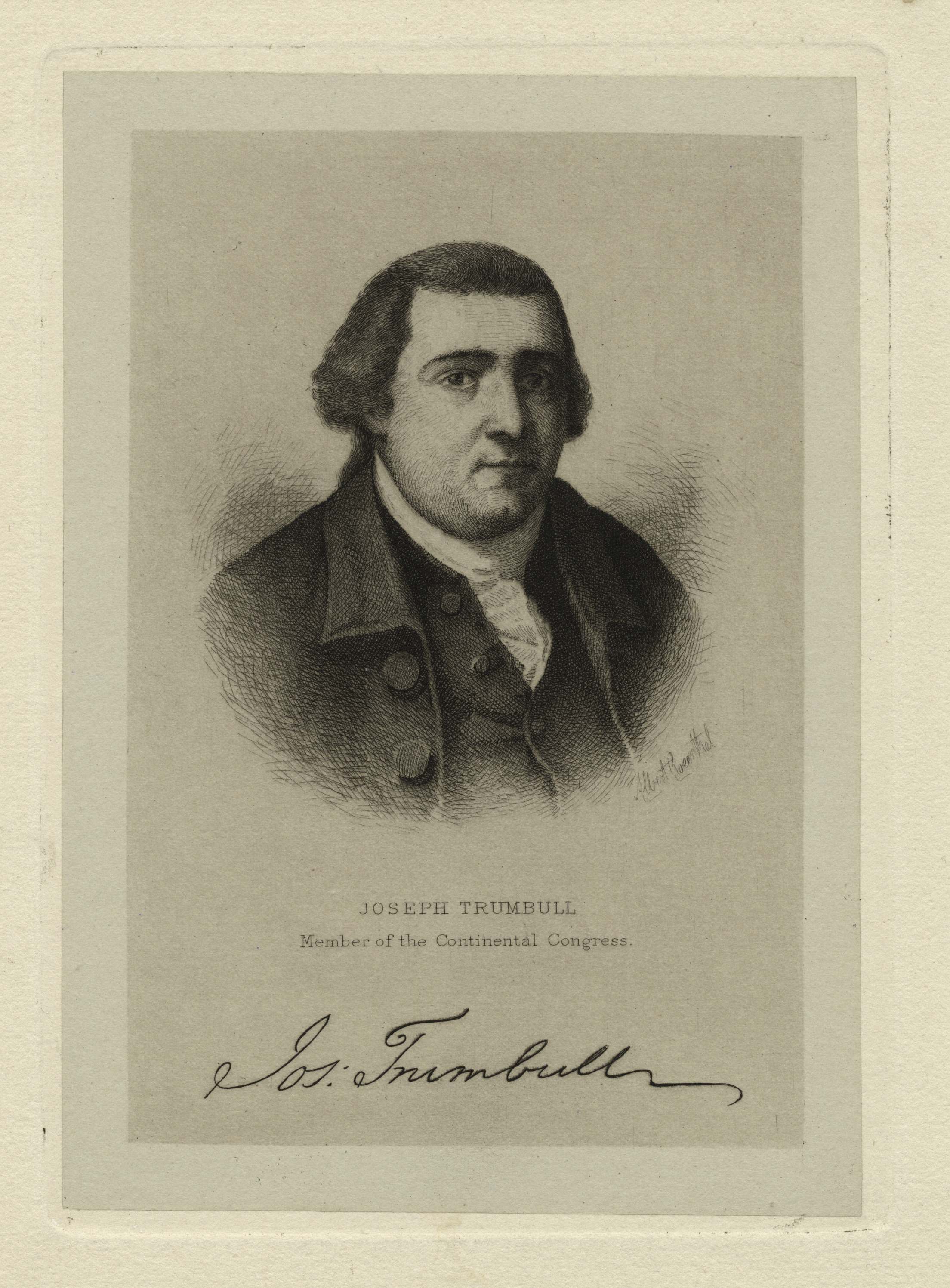
Joseph Trumbull (NYPL NYPG94-F149-419975)

Joseph Trumbull (March 11, 1737 – July 23, 1778), son of Governor Jonathan Trumbull of Connecticut, was the first commissary general of the Continental Army during the American Revolutionary War.

== Biography ==
Trumbull was born in Lebanon, Connecticut. He graduated from Harvard in 1756, the same year his brother, artist John Trumbull, was born, and worked in his father's mercantile business. He served in the Connecticut House of Representatives from 1767 to 1773. He joined the Connecticut Committee of Correspondence at the outset of the American Revolution. He was elected as an alternate delegate to the First Continental Congress in 1774, but did not attend any sessions.

After Lexington and Concord in April 1775, the Connecticut Assembly appointed Trumbull as commissary general in charge of supplying food for the Connecticut troops who had joined the siege of Boston. At Boston, General George Washington was impressed with Trumbull's efforts, and recommended him for the same job in the newly created Continental Army. On 19 July 1775, Congress appointed Trumbull as Commissary General of Stores and Provisions, with the rank of colonel.

Trumbull struggled to meet the needs of the army, and was strongly criticized by some congressmen. He got into a dispute with General Philip Schuyler, who wanted to appoint his nephew Walter Livingston as commissary for Schuyler's Northern Department. Trumbull was charged with corruption but an official inquiry cleared him of wrongdoing in December 1775. Trumbull resigned in 1777 when Congress took away some of his duties.

Congress then appointed him to the Board of War, and he served from August 1777 until his resignation in April 1778 due to sickness. He died three months later in Lebanon and was buried in the East Cemetery.

== See also ==
- Trumbull, Connecticut
- Trumbull County, Ohio
