= Jonathan Trumbull =

American politician (1710–1785)

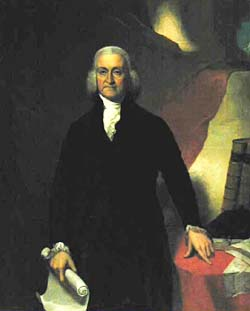

16th Governor of Connecticut
- In office October 10, 1776 – May 13, 1784
- Lieutenant: Matthew Griswold
- Preceded by: Himself (governor of Connecticut Colony)
- Succeeded by: Matthew Griswold

16th Governor of Connecticut Colony
- In office 1769–1776
- Preceded by: William Pitkin
- Succeeded by: Himself (governor of State of Connecticut)

Personal details
- Born: October 12, 1710 Lebanon, Connecticut Colony, British America
- Died: August 17, 1785 (aged 74) Lebanon, Connecticut, United States
- Party: Independent
- Spouse: Faith Robinson
- Children: Joseph Trumbull; Jonathan Trumbull Jr. Faith Trumbull; Mary Trumbull; David Trumbull; John Trumbull
- Education: Harvard College

Jonathan Trumbull Sr. (October 12, 1710 – August 17, 1785) was an American politician who served as the governor of Connecticut during the American Revolution. Trumbull and Nicholas Cooke of Rhode Island were the only men to serve as governor of both a British colony and a U.S. state, and he was the only governor to take up the Patriot cause at the start of the Revolutionary War. Trumbull College at Yale University, the town of Trumbull, Connecticut, Trumbull County, Ohio (originally part of the Connecticut Western Reserve), and Jonathan the Husky the UConn mascot are all named for him. Trumbull was the father of John Trumbull, the noted artist, and Jonathan Trumbull Jr., Governor of Connecticut and Speaker of the United States House of Representatives.

== Early life ==
Coat of Arms of Jonathan Trumbull

Trumbull was born in Lebanon, Connecticut, the son of Joseph Trumble (1678–1755) and his wife, Hannah Trumble (née Higley), the daughter of John Higley and Hannah Drake. The patriarch of the Trumble family was the immigrant John Trumble (1612–1687), from Newcastle upon Tyne, Northumberland, who was Joseph's grandfather. The original spelling of "Trumble" was later changed for an unknown reason.

Jonathan graduated from Harvard College with a B.A. in 1727; for three years after graduation, he studied theology under the Reverend Solomon Williams at Lebanon and was licensed to preach at Colchester, Connecticut; this became a Master of Arts degree.

== Career ==
Trumbull became a merchant with his father in 1731, participating more fully in the business after the death of his brother at sea in 1732. From 1733 to 1740, he was a delegate to the general assembly, and, in 1739–1740, was Speaker of the House. He was appointed lieutenant colonel in Connecticut's militia in 1739, and was colonel of the 12th Connecticut Regiment during the French and Indian War.

He served as deputy governor of the Colony of Connecticut from 1766 to 1769, and, on the death of Governor William Pitkin, became Governor of Connecticut in 1769, serving in that capacity until 1784, through Connecticut's transition from a colony to a U.S. state.

=== Revolutionary War ===
On May 13, 1774, British General Thomas Gage arrived in Boston, a city with a history of violent protests against British policies. Given the problems he was inheriting from Royal Governor Thomas Hutchinson, within a week of arriving Gage contacted Trumbull and expressed a "readiness to cooperate" with him "for the good of his Majesty's service." When Gage sent Trumbull a request for assistance after the Battles of Lexington and Concord in April 1775, Trumbull refused and made clear his choice to side with the Patriots. He replied that Gage's troops would "disgrace even barbarians", and he accused Gage of "a most unprovoked attack upon the lives and the property of his Majesty's subjects."

On July 6, 1775, along with other officers, Trumbull commissioned Nathan Hale as a first lieutenant in the newly raised Seventh Connecticut Regiment of the Continental Army. Hale was later executed by the British for espionage.

Trumbull was a friend and advisor of General George Washington throughout the Revolutionary period, dedicating the resources of Connecticut to the fight for independence. Washington declared him "the first of the patriots." When Washington was desperate for men or food during the war, he could turn to "Brother Jonathan".

=== Post-war ===
Trumbull was one of only two colonial governors to continue in office after independence (the other was Rhode Island's Nicholas Cooke, who assumed office early in the war). Governor Trumbull was elected as an honorary member of the Connecticut Society of the Cincinnati in 1784. In 1782, he was elected a Fellow of the American Academy of Arts and Sciences. He received an honorary LL.D. from Yale University in 1775 and from the University of Edinburgh in 1787.

== Personal life ==
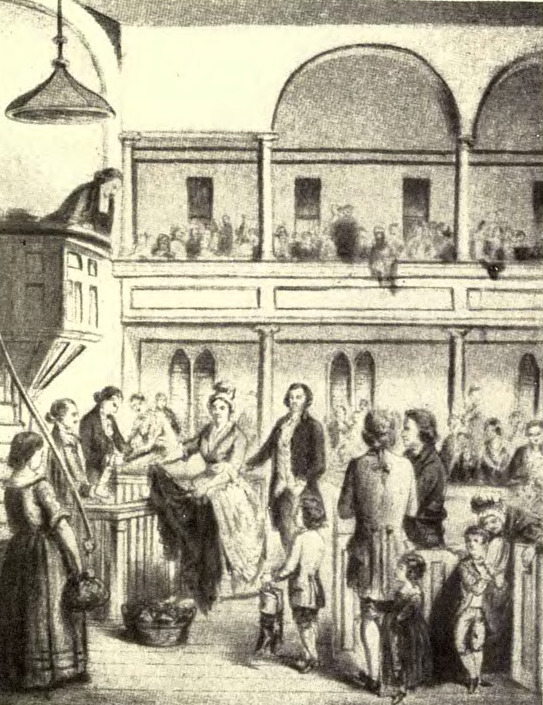
Faith Robinson Trumbull, depicted donating her cloak for the revolutionary war effort

In 1736, one year prior to his marriage, Jonathan Trumbull Sr. purchased Flora, a 'mulato girl and slave for life', from Eliphalet Adams of New London.

On December 9, 1735, he married Faith Robinson (1718–1780), daughter of Reverend John Robinson. They were the parents of six children, including:

- Joseph Trumbull (1737–1778), first commissary general of the Continental Army and an early member of the Board of War.
- Jonathan Trumbull Jr. (1740–1809), aide-de-camp to General George Washington from 1781 to the end of the war, Speaker of the House from 1791 to 1793, and Governor of Connecticut from 1798 to 1809.
- Faith Trumbull (1743–1775), who married General Jedidiah Huntington.
- Mary Trumbull (1745–1831), who married William Williams, signer of the Declaration of Independence.
- David Trumbull (1751–1822), commissary of the Colony of Connecticut and father of Joseph Trumbull, the 35th Governor of Connecticut.
- John Trumbull (1756–1843), "Painter of the American Revolution" and aide-de-camp to General Washington for 19 days in 1775.

Trumbull died in Lebanon, Connecticut, and is buried at the Trumbull Cemetery (also known as the Old Cemetery). there. His home in Lebanon, the Jonathan Trumbull House, was declared a National Historic Landmark in 1965.

== In historical fiction ==
- In A Little Maid of Old Connecticut by Alice Turner Curtis, the main character, a little girl named Ellie Barlow, aided by a friend, delivers a secret message to Trumbull during his years as governor, after which he seeks her out, and helps her friend's father get a much-needed job. The story begins in the year 1777.

== See also ==
- Maria Trumbull, granddaughter

== Bibliography ==
- Baker, Mark Allen (2014). Spies of Revolutionary Connecticut, From Benedict Arnold to Nathan Hale. The History Press.
- Baker, Mark Allen (2014). Connecticut Families of the Revolution, American Forebears from Burr to Wolcott. The History Press.
- Phelps, M. William (2008). Nathan Hale: The Life and Death of America's First Spy, St. Martin's Press.
- Lefkowitz, Arthur S.(2003). George Washington's Indispensable Men: The 32 Aides-de-Camp Who Helped Win the Revolution, Stackpole Books.
- Rose, Alexander (2006). Washington's Spies: The Story of America's First Spy Ring, Bantam Books.

Political offices
| Preceded by William Pitkin | Governor of the Connecticut Colony; 1769–1776 | Succeeded by himself as Governor of Connecticut |
| Preceded by himself as Governor of the Connecticut Colony | Governor of Connecticut; 1776–1784 | Succeeded by Matthew Griswold |
