= Lebanon, Connecticut =

- Town
- Town of Lebanon
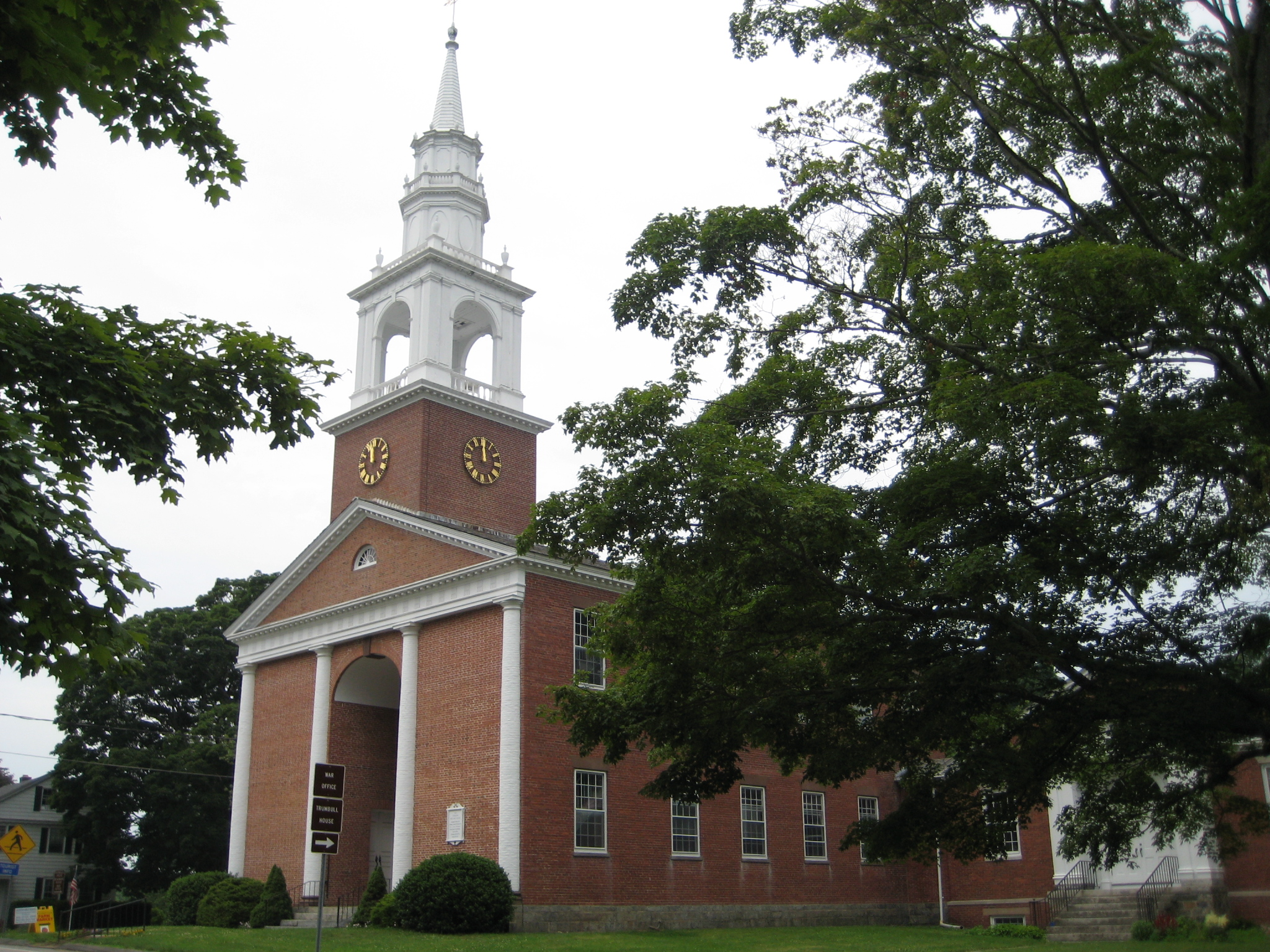
- The First Congregational Church on the Green, site of the first town council and featured on the town seal

- Seal
- Interactive map of Lebanon, Connecticut
- Coordinates: 41°37′57″N 72°14′24″W
- Country: United States
- U.S. state: Connecticut
- County: New London
- Region: Southeastern CT
- Incorporated: 1700

Government
  - Type: Selectman-town meeting
  - First selectman: Kathleen Smith (D)

Area
  - Total: 55.2 sq mi (143.0 km^{2})
  - Land: 54.1 sq mi (140.2 km^{2})
  - Water: 1.1 sq mi (2.9 km^{2})
- Elevation: 499 ft (152 m)

Population (2020)
  - Total: 7,142
  - Density: 131.9/sq mi (50.94/km^{2})
- Time zone: UTC−5 (Eastern)
  - Summer (DST): UTC−4 (Eastern)
- ZIP Code: 06249
- Area codes: 860/959
- FIPS code: 09-42390
- GNIS feature ID: 0213449
- Website: www.lebanonct.gov

Lebanon (/ˈlɛbənən/ LEB-ən-ən) is a town in New London County, Connecticut, United States. The town is part of the Southeastern Connecticut Planning Region. The population was 7,142 at the 2020 census. The town lies just to the northwest of Norwich, directly south of Willimantic, 20 miles (32 km) north of New London, and 20 miles (32 km) east of Hartford. It is best known for its role in the American Revolution, when it was a major base of American operations, and for its historic town green, which is one of the largest in the nation and the only one still used partially for agriculture.

== History ==
=== From Poquechaneed to Lebanon ===
Lebanon was originally inhabited by the Mohegan people, an Algonquian-speaking tribe in the upper Thames River Valley in eastern Connecticut. The area was known as Poquechaneed and was used primarily for hunting.

Lebanon was settled by colonists from Norwich who wanted to expand beyond the nine square miles that they had bought from Mohegan sachem Uncas. In 1663, the first grant in the area was given to Major John Mason, deputy governor of the Connecticut Colony; the next year, Mason accepted 500 acres (2.0 km^{2}) northwest of Norwich. This area was known as "Pomakuck" or "Pomocook" by the Mohegans and is now the Goshen Hill area of Lebanon.

In 1666, Connecticut granted an additional 120 acres (0.49 km^{2}) to the Rev. James Fitch, minister of Norwich, adjacent to Maj. Mason's land which was now known as Cedar Swamp. The Mohegans conferred their blessing on the grants by giving an additional 7-mile (11 km) strip to Maj. Mason's son in 1675, who split the land with the Rev. Fitch, his father-in-law. This area is now known as "Fitch and Mason's Mile", or just "The Mile".

In 1692, Uncas' son Owaneco sold 25 square miles (65 km^{2}) to four men from Norwich and Stonington known as the "Five Mile Purchase" or "Five Mile Square", being 5 miles (8 km) on each side. With the Purchase, most of the town of Lebanon was established.

The town of Lebanon was incorporated by the General Assembly of the Connecticut Colony on October 10, 1700. The town's name was the idea of one of Rev. Fitch's sons, because of "the height of the land, and a large cedar forest." Lebanon was the first town in the Connecticut Colony to be given a Biblical name. From its incorporation in 1700, Lebanon was part of New London County. In 1724 it became part of the newly created Windham County where it remained until 1826 when it was reassigned to New London County.

=== "Heartbeat of the Revolution" ===
Connecticut's effort during the Revolutionary War was directed from the War Office on the Green and the adjacent home of Governor Jonathan Trumbull Sr.

William Williams was a signer of the Declaration of Independence. He was a native of Lebanon and son-in-law to Governor Trumbull.

Trumbull was the only colonial governor to side with the Patriots during the Revolution. He served as one of George Washington's chief quartermasters, convening a Council of Safety to manage the affairs of the Continental Army. The council met over 1,100 times, mostly in Trumbull's own house on the Lebanon Green. He was also paymaster general for the Northern Department of the Continental Army, and the first comptroller of the young nation's treasury during the war.

Trumbull's children were also influential in the war effort. Joseph Trumbull was a colonel in the Continental Army, Jonathan Trumbull Jr. was secretary to George Washington, and John Trumbull served first as a soldier and then as Washington's personal aide during the war.

French duc de Lauzun's Legion of Horse encamped in Lebanon from November 1780 to June 21, 1781. The legion became infamous later for disorderliness, dueling, and pillaging, but they were generally well behaved in Lebanon. However, two officers were executed by firing squad for attempted desertion while here. The local economy benefited only slightly from the troops' extended stay. In June, the soldiers rode off toward White Plains, New York. Lauzun remarked later in his memoirs, "Siberia alone can furnish any idea of Lebanon, which consists of a few huts scattered among vast forests."

The importance of the Trumbull family and of Lebanon itself to the war effort earned the town the nickname "Heartbeat of the Revolution."

=== Into the 19th and 20th centuries ===
Joseph Trumbull, father of Jonathan Trumbull Sr., brought livestock farming to the town in 1704, and Lebanon had the largest meat packing industry in Connecticut by 1730. Agriculture has since been the primary focus of the town. The Trumbull family left Lebanon after the death of Jonathan Trumbull Jr. in 1809, and the town's political significance fell.

Lebanon maintained its focus on agriculture and remained a dedicated farming town, as the towns around it became more commercialized. It was this characteristic that brought a major wave of immigration in the early 20th century. Political troubles in Russia and the onset of the First World War encouraged many to flee to America. The village of Karlswalde near Ostrog saw its entire population leave. Philip Krause settled in the Village Hill area of Lebanon. The town offered similar terrain and fertile farming ground, and 12 families of Karlswalde had moved to the Lebanon neighborhood by 1928. Many of these families are still present and active in Lebanon today and have been a major influence on the town's culture.

The Liberty Hill neighborhood was the commercial center of town for most of the 19th century and into the 20th, holding the town's post office and two general stores. It was Lebanon's primary link to the larger Connecticut and New England communities. The area maintained its importance into the 1940s.

Lebanon saw more than ten percent of its residents leave to fight in the Second World War. The Memorial Day parade is still one of the town's largest annual celebrations.

=== Present ===
The town has large agricultural and service sectors, the largest employers being farms and the school system. KofKoff Egg Farms is New England's largest egg producer, and it maintains a farm in the town. The Lebanon Country Fair is known for its agricultural shows. The Lebanon School District is responsible for the town's three schools: Lyman Memorial High School, Lebanon Middle School, and Lebanon Elementary School. The town is still centered around the Green which is the site of many of Lebanon's most prominent past citizens' homes, including Gov. Trumbull and William Beaumont. First Congregational Church of Lebanon, Lebanon Baptist Church, and Saint Francis of Assisi Roman Catholic Church are also located on the Green. The Jonathan Trumbull Library is also located on the Green, as are the War Office, the Jonathan Trumbull Jr. house, and the Wadsworth Stable. The Redeemer Lutheran Church is located at the Village Hill area of town, with the Lebanon Bible Church and Goshen Congregational Church located in the Goshen area.

== Notable people ==
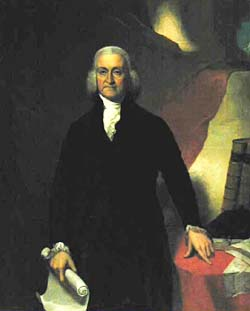
Gov. Jonathan Trumbull

- William Beaumont (1785–1853), "Father of Gastric Physiology", whose book describing digestion, published in 1833, became a classical medical study still used today
- Martha Wadsworth Brewster (1710 – c. 1757), poet and writer, one of the earliest American female literary figures
- William Alfred Buckingham (1804–1875), businessman, elected four-term mayor of Norwich, later elected seven-term governor of Connecticut. Served during the Civil War. Elected to the U.S. Senate in 1868 and died in office.
- Nelson Dewey (1813–1889), first governor of Wisconsin (1848–1852) at the age of 35
- Ralph Gurley (1797–1872), clergyman, chaplain of the US House of Representatives, and an influential figure in the American Colonization Society, which offered passage to their colony in west Africa (now Liberia) to free black Americans
- Henry Strong McCall (1819–1893), lawyer and writer
- Prince Saunders (1775–1839), attorney general of the Republic of Haiti
- William Strong (1763–1840), US congressman and judge
- Jonathan Trumbull Sr. (1710–1785), governor of Connecticut, father of Jonathan Trumbull Jr., and a strong supporter of Washington during the American Revolutionary War, studied theology in Lebanon and later died in the town, where he is buried (portrait at right)
- Joseph Trumbull (1737–1778), a delegate to the Continental Congress in 1774 (did not attend sessions), and colonel in the Continental Army. He served as one of the Commissary Generals. Son of Jonathan Trumbull Sr.
- Jonathan Trumbull Jr. (1740–1809), General George Washington's secretary during the American Revolution, later eight-term governor of the state. Son of Jonathan Trumbull Sr.
- John Trumbull (1756–1843), American neoclassical painter, famous for artwork in the US Capitol, and the artwork on the back of the two-dollar bill. Son of Jonathan Trumbull Sr.
- Joseph Trumbull (1782–1861), state governor, later Connecticut representative to the US Congress. Grandson of Jonathan Trumbull Sr.
- Pelatiah Webster (1726–1795), Colonial merchant and author of short essays concerning the finances and government of the fledging United States
- William Williams (1731–1811), merchant and delegate for Connecticut to the Second Continental Congress in 1776, where he signed the Declaration of Independence. Son-in-law of Jonathan Trumbull Sr.
- Eleazar Wheelock (1711–1779), Congregational minister, orator, educator, and founder of Dartmouth College

== Geography ==
According to the United States Census Bureau, the town has a total area of 55.2 square miles (143 km^{2}), of which 54.1 square miles (140 km^{2}) is land and 1.1 square miles (2.8 km^{2}), or 2.05%, is water. Gates Hill, at 660 ft (200 m), is the highest point in the town and in New London County.

=== Principal communities ===
- Exeter
- Goshen Hill
- Lebanon Center
- Leonard Bridge
- Liberty Hill

Other minor named locations in the town are Babcock Hill, Bush Hill, Chestnut Hill, Cook Hill, Coreyville, Kick Hill, Mason Hill, Scott Hill, Standish Hill, and Village Hill.

== Demographics ==
Historical population
Census	Pop.	Note	%±
1850	1,901		—
1860	2,174		14.4%
1870	2,211		1.7%
1880	1,845		−16.6%
1890	1,670		−9.5%
1900	1,521		−8.9%
1910	1,528		0.5%
1920	1,343		−12.1%
1930	1,436		6.9%
1940	1,467		2.2%
1950	1,654		12.7%
1960	2,434		47.2%
1970	3,804		56.3%
1980	4,762		25.2%
1990	6,041		26.9%
2000	6,907		14.3%
2010	7,308		5.8%
2020	7,142		−2.3%
Population 1990 - 2000; Population 2010

As of the census of 2000, there were 6,907 people, 2,446 households, and 1,934 families residing in the town. The population density was 127.6 inhabitants per square mile (49.3/km^{2}). There were 2,820 housing units at an average density of 52.1 per square mile (20.1/km^{2}). The racial makeup of the town was 96.89% White, 0.81% African American, 0.39% Native American, 0.26% Asian, 0.06% Pacific Islander, 0.49% from other races, and 1.10% from two or more races. Hispanic or Latino of any race were 1.65% of the population.

There were 2,446 households, out of which 38.6% had children under the age of 18 living with them, 66.4% were married couples living together, 8.8% had a female householder with no husband present, and 20.9% were non-families. 15.7% of all households were made up of individuals, and 5.4% had someone living alone who was 65 years of age or older. The average household size was 2.77 and the average family size was 3.09.

In the town, the population was spread out, with 28.0% under the age of 18, 5.5% from 18 to 24, 31.0% from 25 to 44, 26.0% from 45 to 64, and 9.5% who were 65 years of age or older. The median age was 38 years. For every 100 females, there were 101.9 males. For every 100 females age 18 and over, there were 98.2 males.

The median income for a household in the town was $61,173, and the median income for a family was $63,198. Males had a median income of $45,952 versus $35,594 for females. The per capita income for the town was $25,784. About 1.5% of families and 2.3% of the population were below the poverty line, including 2.0% of those under age 18 and 3.7% of those age 65 or over.

Voter Registration and Party Enrollment as of October 25, 2005
Party	Active Voters	Inactive Voters	Total Voters	Percentage
Republican	1,195	40	1,235	25.72%
Democratic	1,178	49	1,227	25.56%
Unaffiliated	2,216	119	2,335	48.64%
Minor Parties	4	0	4	0.08%
Total	4,593	208	4,801	100%
