= List of high schools in Connecticut =

This list of high schools in the state of Connecticut is a sortable table. To sort alphabetically by the subject of each column, click on the triangles in each column heading. A second click reorders the list in reverse alphabetical order by that column. The default order for the list is alphabetically by community name.

School names are listed with the full, official name of the school without beginning articles such as 'the' to allow the below table to be sorted appropriately. Some schools named after people are sometimes known by the last name of the person (such as "O'Brien Tech", for Emmett O'Brien Technical High School).

Name (Common Name)	Public/Private (Affiliation)	Town	County	Athletic Conference	Nickname	Notes
Henry Abbott Technical High School (Abbott Tech)	Connecticut Technical High School System	Danbury	Fairfield County	Connecticut Technical Conference	Wolverines	
Academy of Aerospace and Engineering	Capitol Region Education Council	Windsor	Hartford County	Capitol Region Athletic League	Jets	
Academy of Computer Science and Engineering	Capitol Region Education Council	Enfield	Hartford County	Capitol Region Athletic League	Eagles	
Academy of Information Technology and Engineering	Stamford Public Schools	Stamford	Fairfield County	N/A	Cyber Rams	
Academy of Science and Innovation	Capitol Region Education Council	New Britain	Hartford County	Capitol Region Athletic League	Ravens	Grades 6-12
Academy of the Holy Family	Private (Catholic)	Sprague	New London County	CIAC	Marist Eagles	For girls
Achievement First Amistad High School	Amistad Academy District	New Haven	New Haven County	Capitol Region Athletic League	Wolves	
Amity Regional High School	Regional School District 5	Woodbridge	New Haven County	Southern Connecticut Conference	Spartans	Also serves Bethany and Orange
Ansonia High School	Ansonia School District	Ansonia	New Haven County	Naugatuck Valley League	Chargers	
Avon High School	Avon Public Schools	Avon	Hartford County	Central Connecticut Conference	Falcons	
Avon Old Farms	Private (nonsectarian)	Avon	Hartford County	Founders League	Winged Beavers	For boys
Bacon Academy	Colchester Public Schools	Colchester	New London County	Eastern Connecticut Conference	Bobcats	
Bassick High School	Bridgeport Public Schools	Bridgeport	Fairfield County	FCIAC	Lions	
Berlin High School	Berlin Public Schools	Berlin	Hartford County	Central Connecticut Conference	Redcoats	
Bethel High School	Bethel Public Schools	Bethel	Fairfield County	South-West Conference	Wildcats	
Bi-Cultural Hebrew Academy of Connecticut	Private (Jewish)	Bridgeport	Fairfield County	N/A	N/A	Grades K-12
Bloomfield High School	Bloomfield Public Schools	Bloomfield	Hartford County	Central Connecticut Conference	Warhawks	
Bolton High School	Bolton Public Schools	Bolton	Tolland County	North Central Connecticut Conference	Bulldogs	
Branford High School	Branford Public Schools	Branford	New Haven County	Southern Connecticut Conference	Hornets	
The Bridge Academy Charter School	Charter	Bridgeport	Fairfield County	CIAC	Panthers	
Bridgeport International Academy	Private (nonsectarian)	Bridgeport	Fairfield County	N/A	N/A	
Brien McMahon High School	Norwalk Public Schools	Norwalk	Fairfield County	FCIAC	Senators	
Bristol Central High School	Bristol Public Schools	Bristol	Hartford County	Central Connecticut Conference	Rams	
Bristol Eastern High School	Bristol Public Schools	Bristol	Hartford County	Central Connecticut Conference	Lancers	
Bristol Technical Education Center	Connecticut Technical High School System	Bristol	Hartford County	N/A	N/A	Attending students receive diplomas from their local high schools
Brookfield High School	Brookfield Public Schools	Brookfield	Fairfield County	South-West Conference	Bobcats	
Brunswick School	Private (nonsectarian)	Greenwich	Fairfield County	Fairchester Athletic Association	Bruins	For boys
Bulkeley High School	Hartford Public Schools	Hartford	Hartford County	Central Connecticut Conference	Bulldogs	
Bullard Havens Technical High School (Bullard Havens Tech)	Connecticut Technical High School System	Bridgeport	Fairfield County	Connecticut Technical Conference	Tigers	
Bunnell High School	Stratford Public Schools	Stratford	Fairfield County	South-West Conference	Bulldogs	
Canton High School	Canton Public Schools	Canton	Hartford County	North Central Connecticut Conference	Warriors	
Canterbury School	Private (Catholic)	New Milford	Litchfield County	NEPSAC	Saints	Boarding option
Capital Preparatory Magnet School (Capital Prep)	Magnet	Hartford	Hartford County	Capitol Region Athletic League	Trailblazers	
Cedarhurst School	Private (Therapeutic)	Hamden	New Haven County	N/A	N/A	Grades 7-12
Bridgeport Central High School	Bridgeport Public Schools	Bridgeport	Fairfield County	FCIAC	Hilltoppers	
Howell Cheney Technical High School (Cheney Tech)	Connecticut Technical High School System	Manchester	Hartford County	Connecticut Technical Conference	Beavers	
Cheshire Academy	Private (nonsectarian)	Cheshire	New Haven County	NEPSAC	Cats	
Cheshire High School	Cheshire Public Schools	Cheshire	New Haven County	Southern Connecticut Conference	Rams	
Choate Rosemary Hall	Private (nonsectarian)	Wallingford	New Haven County	Founders League	Wild Boars	Boarding
Christian Heritage School	Private (Christian)	Trumbull	Fairfield County	Housatonic Valley Athletic League	Kingsmen	Grades K-12
Classical Magnet School	Hartford Public Schools	Hartford	Hartford County	Capitol Region Athletic League	Gladiators	Grades 6-12
Coginchaug Regional High School	Regional School District 13	Durham	Middlesex County	Shoreline Conference	Blue Devils	Also serves Middlefield
Common Ground High School	Charter	New Haven	New Haven County	N/A	Hawks	
Conard High School	West Hartford Public Schools	West Hartford	Hartford County	Central Connecticut Conference	Red Wolves	
Connecticut International Baccalaureate Academy	Magnet	East Hartford	Hartford County	N/A	N/A	
Connecticut River Academy	Magnet	East Hartford	Hartford County	N/A	Eagles	
Cooperative High School	Amistad Academy District	New Haven	New Haven County	N/A	N/A	
Crec Academy of International Studies	Capitol Region Education Council	Bloomfield	Hartford County	N/A	N/A	Grades 6-12
Crosby High School	Waterbury Public Schools	Waterbury	New Haven County	Naugatuck Valley League	Bulldogs	
Coventry High School	Coventry Public Schools	Coventry	Tolland County	North Central Connecticut Conference	Patriots	
Cromwell High School	Cromwell Public Schools	Cromwell	Middlesex County	Shoreline Conference	Panthers	
Danbury High School	Danbury Public Schools	Danbury	Fairfield County	FCIAC	Hatters	
Daniel Hand High School	Madison Public Schools	Madison	New Haven County	Southern Connecticut Conference	Tigers	
Darien High School	Darien Public Schools	Darien	Fairfield County	FCIAC	Blue Wave	
Derby High School	Derby Public Schools	Derby	New Haven County	Naugatuck Valley League	Red Raiders	
E.O. Smith High School	Regional School District 19	Storrs	Tolland County	Central Connecticut Conference	Panthers	serves Ashford, Mansfield and Willington
East Catholic High School	Private (Catholic)	Manchester	Hartford County	Central Connecticut Conference	Eagles	
East Granby High School	East Granby Public Schools	East Granby	Hartford County	North Central Connecticut Conference	Crusaders	
East Hampton High School	East Hampton Public Schools	East Hampton	Middlesex County	Shoreline Conference	Bellringers	
East Hartford High School	East Hartford Public Schools	East Hartford	Hartford County	Central Connecticut Conference	Hornets	
East Haven High School	East Haven Public Schools	East Haven	New Haven County	Southern Connecticut Conference	Yellow Jackets	
East Lyme High School	East Lyme Public Schools	East Lyme	New London County	Eastern Connecticut Conference	Vikings	Also serves Salem
East Windsor High School	East Windsor Public Schools	East Windsor	Hartford County	North Central Connecticut Conference	Panthers	
Ellington High School	Ellington Public Schools	Ellington	Tolland County	North Central Connecticut Conference	Knights	
H. H. Ellis Technical High School (Ellis Tech)	Connecticut Technical High School System	Killingly	Windham County	Connecticut Technical Conference	Golden Eagles	
Enfield High School	Enfield Public Schools	Enfield	Hartford County	Central Connecticut Conference	Eagles	
Ethel Walker School	Private (nonsectarian)	Simsbury	Hartford County	Founders League	Walkers	Grades 7-12, boarding option, for girls
Explorations Charter School	Charter	Winsted	Litchfield County	N/A	N/A	
Fairfield Ludlowe High School	Fairfield Public Schools	Fairfield	Fairfield County	FCIAC	Falcons	
Fairfield College Preparatory School (Fairfield Prep)	Private (Catholic)	Fairfield	Fairfield County	Southern Connecticut Conference	Jesuits	For boys
Fairfield Warde High School	Fairfield Public Schools	Fairfield	Fairfield County	FCIAC	Mustangs	
Faith Preparatory School	Private (Christian)	New Milford	Litchfield County	Constitution State Conference	Bulldogs	Grades PK-12, nondenominational
Farmington High School	Farmington Public Schools	Farmington	Hartford County	Central Connecticut Conference	River Hawks	
Fitch Senior High School	Groton Public Schools	Groton	New London County	Eastern Connecticut Conference	Falcons	
Foran High School	Milford Public Schools	Milford	New Haven County	Southern Connecticut Conference	Lions	
Forman School	Private (nonsectarian)	Litchfield	Litchfield County	Housatonic Valley Athletic League	Lions	Boarding option, serves students with learning differences
Franklin Academy	Private (Therapeutic)	East Haddam	Middlesex County	N/A	Phoenix	Grades 8-12, boarding, serves students with nonverbal learning disabilities/autism spectrum disorder
Gilbert School	Public Endowed	Winsted	Litchfield County	Berkshire League	Yellow Jackets	Grades 7-12
Glastonbury High School	Glastonbury Public Schools	Glastonbury	Hartford County	Central Connecticut Conference	Guardians	
E. C. Goodwin Technical High School (Goodwin Tech)	Connecticut Technical High School System	New Britain	Hartford County	Connecticut Technical Conference	Gladiators	
Grace S. Webb School	Private (Therapeutic)	Hartford	Hartford County	N/A	N/A	Grades K-12
Granby Memorial High School	Granby Public Schools	Granby	Hartford County	North Central Connecticut Conference	Bears	
Grasso Southeastern Technical High School (Grasso Tech)	Connecticut Technical High School System	Groton	New London County	Connecticut Technical Conference	Eagles	
Greater Hartford Academy of the Arts	Capitol Region Education Council	Hartford	Hartford County	N/A	N/A	
Greens Farms Academy	Private (nonsectarian)	Westport	Fairfield County	Fairchester Athletic Association	Dragons	Grades PK-12
Greenwich Academy	Private (nonsectarian)	Greenwich	Fairfield County	Fairchester Athletic Association	Gators	For girls
Greenwich High School	Greenwich Public Schools	Greenwich	Fairfield County	FCIAC	Cardinals	
Griswold High School	Griswold Public Schools	Griswold	New London County	Eastern Connecticut Conference	Wolverines	
Grove School	Private (therapeutic)	Madison	New Haven County	Coastal Conference (CT/RI)	Hawks	Grades 7-12, boarding option
Guilford High School	Guilford Public Schools	Guilford	New Haven County	Southern Connecticut Conference	Grizzlies	
Haddam-Killingworth High School	Regional School District 17	Haddam	Middlesex County	Shoreline Conference	Cougars	Serves Haddam and Killingworth
Hall High School	West Hartford Public Schools	West Hartford	Hartford County	Central Connecticut Conference	Titans	
Hamden Hall Country Day School	Private (nonsectarian)	Hamden	New Haven County	Fairchester Athletic Association	Hornets	Grades PK-12
Hamden High School	Hamden Public Schools	Hamden	New Haven County	Southern Connecticut Conference	Green Dragons	
Harding High School	Bridgeport Public Schools	Bridgeport	Fairfield County	unknown	Presidents	
Hartford Magnet Trinity College Academy	Hartford Public Schools	Hartford	Hartford County	North Central Connecticut Conference	Phoenix	
Hartford Public High School	Hartford Public Schools	Hartford	Hartford County	Central Connecticut Conference	Owls	
Hill Regional Career Magnet High School	Amistad Academy District	New Haven	New Haven County	Connecticut Technical Conference	Panthers	
Hillhouse High School	Amistad Academy District	New Haven	New Haven County	Southern Connecticut Conference	Bulldogs	
Holy Cross High School	Private (Catholic)	Waterbury	New Haven County	Naugatuck Valley League	Crusaders	
Hopkins School	Private (nonsectarian)	New Haven	New Haven County	Fairchester Athletic Association	Hilltoppers	Grades 7-12
Hotchkiss School	Private (nonsectarian)	Salisbury	Litchfield County	Founders League	Bearcats	Boarding option
Housatonic Valley Regional High School (Housatonic Regional)	Regional School District 1	Canaan	Litchfield County	Berkshire League	Mountaineers	Also serves Cornwall, Kent, North Canaan, Salisbury and Sharon.
Immaculate High School	Roman Catholic Diocese of Bridgeport	Danbury	Fairfield County	South-West Conference	Mustangs	
Joel Barlow High School	Regional School District 9	Redding	Fairfield County	South-West Conference	Falcons	Also serves Easton
Jonathan Law High School	Milford Public Schools	Milford	New Haven County	Southern Connecticut Conference	Lawmen/Eagles	
W.F. Kaynor Technical High School (Kaynor Tech)	Connecticut Technical High School System	Waterbury	New Haven County	Connecticut Technical Conference	Panthers	
Kennedy High School	Waterbury Public Schools	Waterbury	New Haven County	Naugatuck Valley League	Eagles	
Kent School	Private (Episcopal)	Kent	Litchfield County	Founders League	Lions	
Killingly High School	Killingly Public Schools	Killingly	Windham County	Eastern Connecticut Conference	Redmen	
King School	Private (nonsectarian)	Stamford	Fairfield County	Fairchester Athletic Association	Vikings	Grades PK-12
Kingswood-Oxford School	Private (nonsectarian)	West Hartford	Hartford County	Founders League	Wyverns	Grades 6-12
Kolbe Cathedral High School	Roman Catholic Diocese of Bridgeport	Bridgeport	Fairfield County	South-West Conference	Cougars	
Laurelton Hall	Private (Catholic)	Milford	New Haven County	Southern Connecticut Conference	Crusaders	For girls
Ledyard High School	Ledyard Public Schools	Ledyard	New London County	Eastern Connecticut Conference	Colonels	
Lewis Mills High School	Regional School District 10	Burlington	Hartford County	Central Connecticut Conference	Spartans	serving Harwinton and Burlington
Litchfield High School	Litchfield Public Schools	Litchfield	Litchfield County	Berkshire League	Cowboys	Grades 7-12
Loomis Chaffee School	Private (nonsectarian)	Windsor	Hartford County	Founders League	Pelicans	Boarding option
Lyman Hall High School	Wallingford Public Schools	Wallingford	New Haven County	Southern Connecticut Conference	Trojans	
Lyman Memorial High School	Lebanon School District	Lebanon	New London County	Eastern Connecticut Conference	Bulldogs	
Lyme-Old Lyme High School	Lyme-Old Lyme Schools	Old Lyme	New London County	Shoreline Conference	Wildcats	Serves Lyme and Old Lyme
Maloney High School	Meriden Board of Education	Meriden	New Haven County	Central Connecticut Conference	Spartans	
Manchester High School	Manchester Public Schools	Manchester	Hartford County	Central Connecticut Conference	Red Hawks	
Manchester Regional Academy	Manchester Public Schools	Manchester	Hartford County	N/A	N/A	
Marianapolis Preparatory School	Private (Catholic)	Thompson	Windham County	NEPSAC	Knights	
Marine Science Magnet High School	Magnet	Groton	New London County	N/A	Sharks	
Marvelwood School	Private (nonsectarian)	Kent	Litchfield County	Hudson Valley Athletic League (NY/CT)	Pterodactyls	Boarding
The Master's School	Private (Christian)	Simsbury	Hartford County	Housatonic Valley Athletic League	Lions	Grades PK-12
Masuk High School	Monroe Public Schools	Monroe	Fairfield County	South-West Conference	Panthers	
Mercy High School	Roman Catholic Diocese of Norwich	Middletown	Middlesex County	Southern Connecticut Conference	Tigers	
Metropolitan Learning Center for Global and International Studies	Capitol Region Education Council	Bloomfield	Hartford County	Capitol Region Athletic League	Dragons	Grades 6-12
Middletown High School	Middletown Public Schools	Middletown	Middlesex County	Central Connecticut Conference	Blue Dragons	
Miss Porter's School	Private (nonsectarian)	Farmington	Hartford County	Founders League	Daisys	Boarding option, for girls
Montville High School	Montville Public Schools	Montville	New London County	Eastern Connecticut Conference	Wolves	
Morgan School	Clinton Public Schools	Clinton	Middlesex County	Shoreline Conference	Huskies	
Nathan Hale-Ray High School	East Haddam Public Schools	Moodus	Middlesex County	Shoreline Conference	Noises	
Naugatuck High School	Naugatuck Public Schools	Naugatuck	New Haven County	Naugatuck Valley League	Greyhounds	
New Britain High School	New Britain Public Schools	New Britain	Hartford County	Central Connecticut Conference	Golden Hurricane	
New Canaan High School	New Canaan Public Schools	New Canaan	Fairfield County	FCIAC	Red Rams	
New England Jewish Academy	Private (Jewish)	West Hartford	Hartford County	N/A	Eagles	Grades PK-12
New Fairfield High School	New Fairfield Public Schools	New Fairfield	Fairfield County	South-West Conference	Rebels	
New London High School	New London Public Schools	New London	New London County	Eastern Connecticut Conference	Whalers	
New Milford High School	New Milford Public Schools	New Milford	Litchfield County	South-West Conference	Green Wave	
Newington High School	Newington Public Schools	Newington	Hartford County	Central Connecticut Conference	Nor'easters	
Newtown High School	Newtown Public Schools	Newtown	Fairfield County	South-West Conference	Nighthawks	
Nonnewaug High School	Regional School District 14	Woodbury	Litchfield County	Berkshire League	Chiefs	Also serves Bethlehem
North Branford High School	North Branford Public Schools	North Branford	New Haven County	Shoreline Conference	Thunderbirds	
North Haven High School	North Haven Public Schools	North Haven	New Haven County	Southern Connecticut Conference	Nighthawks	
Northwest Catholic High School	Private (Catholic)	West Hartford	Hartford County	Central Connecticut Conference	Lions	
Northwestern Regional High School	Regional School District 7	Winsted	Litchfield County	Berkshire League	Highlanders	
Norwalk High School	Norwalk Public Schools	Norwalk	Fairfield County	FCIAC	Bears	
Norwich Free Academy	Public endowed	Norwich	New London County	Eastern Connecticut Conference	Wildcats	
Norwich Technical High School (Norwich Tech)	Connecticut Technical High School System	Norwich	New London County	Connecticut Technical Conference	Warriors	
Notre Dame Catholic High School (Notre Dame-Fairfield)	Roman Catholic Diocese of Bridgeport	Fairfield	Fairfield County	South-West Conference	Lancers	
Notre Dame High School (Notre Dame-West Haven)	Private (Catholic)	West Haven	New Haven County	Southern Connecticut Conference	Green Knights	
Emmett O'Brien Technical High School (O'Brien Tech)	Connecticut Technical High School System	Ansonia	New Haven County	Connecticut Technical Conference	Condors	
Old Saybrook Senior High School	Old Saybrook Public Schools	Old Saybrook	Middlesex County	Shoreline Conference	Rams	
Oxford High School	Oxford Public Schools	Oxford	New Haven County	Naugatuck Valley League	Wolverines	
Parish Hill High School	Regional School District 11	Chaplin	Windham County	Capitol Region Athletic League	Pirates	Grades 7-12, also serves Hampton and Scotland
Plainfield High School	Plainfield Public Schools	Central Village in Plainfield	Windham County	Eastern Connecticut Conference	Panthers	Also serves Sterling
Plainville High School	Plainville Public Schools	Plainville	Hartford County	Central Connecticut Conference	Blue Devils	
Platt High School	Meriden Board of Education	Meriden	New Haven County	Central Connecticut Conference	Panthers	
Platt Technical High School (Platt Tech)	Connecticut Technical High School System	Milford	New Haven County	Connecticut Technical Conference	Panthers	
Pomfret School	Private (nonsectarian)	Pomfret	Windham County	NEPSAC	Griffins	Boarding option
Pomperaug Regional High School	Regional School District 15	Southbury	New Haven County	South-West Conference	Panthers	
Portland High School	Portland Public Schools	Portland	Middlesex County	Shoreline Conference	Highlanders	
A.I. Prince Technical High School (Prince Tech)	Connecticut Technical High School System	Hartford	Hartford County	Connecticut Technical Conference	Falcons	
Putnam High School	Putnam Public Schools	Putnam	Windham County	Eastern Connecticut Conference	Clippers	
RHAM High School	Regional School District 8	Hebron	Tolland County	Central Connecticut Conference	Raptors	Also serves Andover and Marlborough
Ridgefield High School	Ridgefield School District	Ridgefield	Fairfield County	FCIAC	Tigers	
Rockville High School	Rockville Public Schools	Vernon	Tolland County	North Central Connecticut Conference	Rams	
Rocky Hill High School	Rocky Hill Public Schools	Rocky Hill	Hartford County	Central Connecticut Conference	Terriers	
Sacred Heart Academy	Roman Catholic Archdiocese of Hartford	Hamden	New Haven County	Southern Connecticut Conference	Sharks	
Sacred Heart Greenwich	Private (Catholic)	Greenwich	Fairfield County	Fairchester Athletic Association	Tigers	Grades K-12, for girls
Salisbury School	Private (nonsectarian)	Salisbury	Litchfield County	NEPSAC	Knights	Boarding, for boys
Seymour High School	Seymour Public Schools	Seymour	New Haven County	Naugatuck Valley League	Wildcats	
Sheehan High School	Wallingford Public Schools	Wallingford	New Haven County	Southern Connecticut Conference	Titans	
Shelton High School	Shelton Public Schools	Shelton	Fairfield County	Southern Connecticut Conference	Gaels	
Shepaug Valley High School	Regional School District 12	Washington	Litchfield County	Berkshire League	Spartans	
Simsbury High School	Simsbury Public Schools	Simsbury	Hartford County	Central Connecticut Conference	Trojans	
Somers High School	Somers Public Schools	Somers	Tolland County	North Central Connecticut Conference	Spartans	
Sound School	New Haven Public Schools	New Haven	New Haven County	N/A	N/A	
South Kent School	Private (nonsectarian)	Kent	Litchfield County	Housatonic Valley Athletic League	Cardinals	Boarding, for boys
South Windsor High School	South Windsor Public Schools	South Windsor	Hartford County	Central Connecticut Conference	Bobcats	
Southington High School	Southington Public Schools	Southington	Hartford County	Central Connecticut Conference	Blue Knights	
Sport and Medical Sciences Academy	Hartford Public Schools	Hartford	Hartford County	North Central Connecticut Conference	Tigers	Grades 7-12
St. Bernard High School	Private (Catholic)	Montville	New London County	Eastern Connecticut Conference	Saints	
St. Joseph High School	Roman Catholic Diocese of Bridgeport	Trumbull	Fairfield County	FCIAC	Cadets	
St. Luke's School	Private (Christian)	New Canaan	Fairfield County	Fairchester Athletic Association	The Storm	Grades 5-12
St. Thomas More School	Private (Roman Catholic)	Oakdale	New London County	NEPSAC	Chancellors	Grades 8-12
St. Paul Catholic High School	Roman Catholic Archdiocese of Hartford	Bristol	Hartford County	Naugatuck Valley League	Falcons	
Stafford High School	Stafford Public Schools	Stafford Springs	Tolland County	North Central Connecticut Conference	Bulldogs	
Stamford High School	Stamford Public Schools	Stamford	Fairfield County	FCIAC	Black Knights	
Staples High School	Westport Public Schools	Westport	Fairfield County	FCIAC	Wreckers	
Stonington High School	Stonington Public Schools	Stonington	New London County	Eastern Connecticut Conference	Bears	
Stratford High School	Stratford Public Schools	Stratford	Fairfield County	South-West Conference	Red Devils	
Suffield Academy	Private (nonsectarian)	Suffield	Hartford County	NEPSAC	Tigers	Boarding option
Suffield High School	Suffield Public Schools	Suffield	Hartford County	North Central Connecticut Conference	Wildcats	
Taft School	Private (nonsectarian)	Watertown	Litchfield County	Founders League	Rhinos	
Terryville High School	Plymouth Public Schools	Plymouth	Litchfield County	Berkshire League	Kangaroos	
Thomaston High School	Thomaston Public Schools	Thomaston	Litchfield County	Berkshire League	Golden Bears	Grades 7-12
Tolland High School	Tolland Public Schools	Tolland	Tolland County	North Central Connecticut Conference	Eagles	
Torrington High School	Torrington Public Schools	Torrington	Litchfield County	Naugatuck Valley League	Red Raiders	
Tourtellotte Memorial High School	Thompson Public Schools	Thompson	Windham County	Eastern Connecticut Conference	Tigers	
Trumbull High School	Trumbull Public Schools	Trumbull	Fairfield County	FCIAC	Eagles	
University High School of Science and Engineering	Hartford Public Schools and University of Hartford	Hartford	Hartford County	Capitol Region Athletic League	Hawks	
Valley Regional High School	Regional School District 4	Deep River	Middlesex County	Shoreline Conference	Valley Vs	Also serves Chester and Essex
Vinal Technical High School	Connecticut Technical High School System	Middletown	Middlesex County	Connecticut Technical Conference	Hawks	
Wamogo Regional High School	Regional School District 6	Litchfield	Litchfield County	Berkshire League	Warriors	7th Grade to 12th Grade
Waterbury Arts Magnet School	Waterbury Public Schools	Waterbury	New Haven County	N/A	N/A	
Waterford High School	Waterford Public Schools	Waterford	New London County	Eastern Connecticut Conference	Lancers	
Watertown High School	Watertown Public Schools	Watertown	Litchfield County	Naugatuck Valley League	Indians	
Watkinson School	Private (nonsectarian)	Hartford	Hartford County	Housatonic Valley Athletic League	Rams	Grades 6-12
Weaver High School	Hartford Public Schools	Hartford	Hartford County	Capitol Region Athletic League	Beavers	
West Haven High School	West Haven Public Schools	West Haven	New Haven County	Southern Connecticut Conference	Blue Devils	
Westbrook High School	Westbrook Public Schools	Westbrook	Middlesex County	Shoreline Conference	Knights	
Westhill High School	Stamford Public Schools	Stamford	Fairfield County	FCIAC	Vikings	
Westminster School	Private (nonsectarian)	Simsbury	Hartford County	Founders League	Martlets	Boarding option
Weston High School	Weston Public Schools	Weston	Fairfield County	South-West Conference	Trojans	
Westover School	Private (nonsectarian)	Middlebury	New Haven County	NEPSAC	Wildcats	Boarding option, for girls
Wethersfield High School	Wethersfield Public Schools	Wethersfield	Hartford County	Central Connecticut Conference	Eagles	
Wheeler High School	North Stonington School District	North Stonington	New London County	Eastern Connecticut Conference	Lions	
Eli Whitney Technical High School (Whitney Tech)	Connecticut Technical High School System	Hamden	New Haven County	Connecticut Technical Conference	Owls	
Wilbur Cross High School	Amistad Academy District	New Haven	New Haven County	Southern Connecticut Conference	Governors	
Wilby High School	Waterbury Public Schools	Waterbury	New Haven County	Naugatuck Valley League	Wildcats	
H.C. Wilcox Technical High School (Wilcox Tech)	Connecticut Technical High School System	Meriden	New Haven County	Connecticut Technical Conference	Wildcats	
Williams School	Private (nonsectarian)	New London	New London County	NEPSAC	Blues	Grades 6-12
Wilton High School	Wilton Public Schools	Wilton	Fairfield County	FCIAC	Warriors	
Windham High School	Windham Public Schools	Willimantic	Windham County	Eastern Connecticut Conference	Whippets	Also serves Columbia
Windham Technical High School	Connecticut Technical High School System	Windham	Windham County	Connecticut Technical Conference	Mighty Tigers	
Windsor High School	Windsor Public Schools	Windsor	Hartford County	Central Connecticut Conference	Warriors	
Windsor Locks High School	Windsor Locks Public Schools	Windsor Locks	Hartford County	North Central Connecticut Conference	Raiders	
Wolcott High School	Wolcott Public Schools	Wolcott	New Haven County	Naugatuck Valley League	Eagles	
Oliver Wolcott Technical High School (Wolcott Tech)	Connecticut Technical High School System	Torrington	Litchfield County	Connecticut Technical Conference	Wildcats	
Woodhall School	Private (nonsectarian)	Bethlehem	Litchfield County	Hudson Valley Athletic League (NY/CT)	The Phoenix	Boarding, for boys
Woodland Regional High School	Regional School District 16	Beacon Falls	New Haven County	Naugatuck Valley League	Hawks	Also serves Prospect
Woodstock Academy	Public endowed	Woodstock	Windham County	Eastern Connecticut Conference	Centaurs	Serves Union, Woodstock, Eastford, Pomfret, Brooklyn
Wooster School	Private (nonsectarian)	Danbury	Fairfield County	Housatonic Valley Athletic League	Generals	Grades 5-12
J. M. Wright Technical High School (Wright Tech)	Connecticut Technical High School System	Stamford	Fairfield County	Connecticut Technical Conference	Warriors	
Xavier High School	Roman Catholic Diocese of Norwich	Middletown	Middlesex County	Southern Connecticut Conference	Falcons	For boys

== See also ==
- List of school districts in Connecticut
