= List of school districts in Connecticut =

The following is a list of public school districts in Connecticut.

The majority of school districts are dependent on town and municipal governments. The U.S. Census Bureau counts the regional school districts, which are governed by independent school boards and cover at least two towns, as individual governments.

== Local ==
=== A ===
- Amistad Academy District
- Ansonia Public Schools
- Area Cooperative Educational
- Ashford School District
- Avon Public Schools

=== B ===
- Berlin Public Schools
- Bethany School District
- Bethel Public Schools
- Bloomfield Public Schools
- Bolton Public Schools
- Bozrah Public Schools
- Branford Public Schools
- Bridgeport Public Schools
- Bristol Public Schools
- Brookfield Public Schools
- Brooklyn Public Schools

=== C ===
- Canterbury Public Schools
- Canton Public Schools
- Chaplin Elementary School
- Cheshire Public Schools
- Clinton Public Schools
- Colchester Public Schools
- Columbia Public Schools
- Consolidated School District of New Britain
- Coventry Public Schools
- Cromwell Public Schools

=== D ===
- Danbury Public Schools
- Danielson Mills The School Danielson
- Danielson Public Schools
- Darien Public Schools
- Derby Public Schools

=== E ===
- East Granby Public Schools
- East Haddam Public Schools
- East Hampton Public Schools
- East Hartford Public Schools
- East Haven Public Schools
- East Lyme Public Schools
- East Windsor Public Schools
- Eastford Elementary School
- Ellington Public Schools
- Enfield Public Schools

=== F ===
- Fairfield Public Schools
- Farmington Public Schools (Farmington, CT)
- Franklin Public Schools

=== G ===
- Glastonbury Public Schools
- Granby Public Schools
- Green Hills Public Schools
- Greenwich Public Schools
- Griswold Public Schools
- Groton Public Schools
- Guilford Public Schools

=== H ===
- Hamden Public Schools
- Hartford Public Schools
- Hartland School

=== K ===
- Kent Center School
- Killingly Public Schools

=== L ===
- Lebanon Public Schools
- Ledyard Public Schools
- Lisbon Central School
- Litchfield Public Schools

=== M ===
- Madison Public Schools
- Manchester Public Schools
- Mansfield Public Schools
- Marlborough Public School District
- Meriden Public Schools
- Middletown Public Schools
- Milford Public Schools
- Monroe Public Schools
- Montville Public Schools

=== N ===
- Naugatuck Public Schools
- New Canaan Public Schools
- New Fairfield Public School District
- New Haven Public Schools
- New Killingly Public Schools
- New London Public Schools
- New Milford Public Schools
- Newington Public Schools
- Newtown Public Schools
- Norfolk School District
- North Branford Public Schools
- North Haven Public Schools
- North Stonington Public Schools
- Norwalk Public Schools
- Norwich Public Schools

=== O ===
- Old Saybrook Public Schools
- Orange Elementary Schools
- Oxford Public Schools

=== P ===
- Plainfield Public Schools
- Plainville Community Schools
- Plymouth Public Schools
- Pomfret Community School
- Portland Public Schools
- Preston Public Schools
- Putnam Public Schools

=== R ===
- Ridgefield Public Schools
- Rocky Hill Public Schools

=== S ===
- Salem Public Schools
- Seymour Public Schools
- Shelton Public Schools
- Sherman School
- Simsbury Public Schools
- Somers Public Schools
- South Windsor Public Schools
- Southington Public Schools
- Sprague Public Schools
- Stafford Public Schools
- Stamford Public Schools
- Sterling Memorial School
- Stonington Public Schools
- Stratford Public Schools
- Suffield Public Schools
- Staples High School

=== T ===
- Thomaston Public Schools
- Thompson Public Schools
- Tolland Public Schools
- Torrington School District
- Trumbull Public Schools

=== U ===
- Union Public Schools

=== V ===
- Vernon Public Schools
- Voluntown Public Schools

=== W ===
- Waterbury Public Schools
- Waterford Public Schools
- Watertown Public Schools
- West Hartford Public Schools
- West Haven Public Schools
- Westbrook Public Schools
- Westford Schools
- Weston Public Schools
- Westport Public Schools
- Wethersfield Public Schools
- Wilton Public Schools
- Winchester Public Schools
- Windham Public Schools
- Windsor Locks Public Schools
- Windsor Public Schools
- Wolcott Public Schools
- Woodstock Public Schools

== Regional ==
- Regional School District 1 (serving 9-12 in Canaan, Cornwall, Kent, North Canaan, Salisbury and Sharon)
- Regional School District 4 (serving 7-12 in Chester, Deep River and Essex)
- Regional School District 5 (serving 7-12 in Bethany, Orange and Woodbridge)
- Regional School District 6 (serving Goshen, Morris and Warren) (Discontinued on June 30, 2024; Merged in Regional School District 20)
- Regional School District 7 (serving 7-12 in Barkhamsted, Colebrook, New Hartford and Norfolk)
- Regional School District 8 (serving 7-12 in Andover, Hebron and Marlborough)
- Regional School District 9 (serving 9-12 in Easton and Redding)
- Regional School District 10 (serving Burlington and Harwinton)
- Regional School District 11 (serving 9-12 in Chaplin, Hampton and Scotland)
- Regional School District 12 (serving Bridgewater, Roxbury and Washington)
- Regional School District 13 (serving Durham and Middlefield)
- Regional School District 14 (serving Bethlehem and Woodbury)
- Regional School District 15 (serving Middlebury and Southbury)
- Regional School District 16 (serving Beacon Falls and Prospect)
- Regional School District 17 (serving Haddam and Killingworth)
- Regional School District 18 (serving Lyme and Old Lyme)
- Regional School District 19 (serving 9-12 in Ashford, Mansfield and Willington)
- Regional School District 20 (serving Goshen, Litchfield, Morris, and Warren)
