= Monroe Public Schools =

Monroe Public Schools can refer to:

- Monroe Public Schools (Connecticut), a school district in Monroe, Connecticut
- Monroe Public Schools (Michigan), a school district in Monroe, Michigan
