= Stratford High School (Connecticut) =

Location
- 245 King Street; Stratford, Connecticut 06615; United States
- Coordinates: 41°11′48″N 73°08′01″W

Information
- School district: Stratford Public Schools
- CEEB code: 070755
- Principal: John "Jack" Dellapiano
- Teaching staff: 80.84 (FTE)
- Grades: 9-12
- Enrollment: 1,131 (2023-2024)
- Student to teacher ratio: 13.99
- Colors: Crimson and Gold
- Athletics: CIAC Class L
- Athletics conference: South West Conference
- Team name: Red Devils
- Rival: Bunnell Bulldogs
- Newspaper: Devil's Advocate
- Website: www.stratfordk12.org/o/shs

Stratford High School is a high school in Stratford, Connecticut, USA. Stratford High serves students in grades 9 - 12. It's part of Stratford Public Schools and is accredited by the New England Association of Schools and Colleges and the Connecticut State Department of Education.

== Notable alumni ==
- Tom Penders (1964), collegiate basketball coach
- Ken Olsen (1944), cofounder of Digital Equipment Corporation (DEC) in 1957
- Ed Bradley (1968), professional football player
- Nick Giaquinto (1973), professional football player
- Victoria Leigh Soto (2003), Sandy Hook Elementary School teacher, died while trying to protect her students during a massacre on December 14, 2012
