= Qingdao No. 58 School =

Qingdao No.58 High School
- 青岛五十八中

Location
- 20 Jiushui Road, Licang; Qingdao, Shandong; China; 36.157524°N 120.431779°E

Information
- School type: Public
- Motto: 追求卓越，报效祖国 (Pursue excellence and serve the motherland.)
- Established: 1952
- Principal: Yuan Guobin
- Teaching staff: 165
- Average class size: 50
- Language: Mandarin
- Campus size: 96 acres

The Qingdao No. 58 High School (山东省青岛五十八中) is a boarding school in Qingdao, China. It has the highest cut-off scores in the senior-high school entrance examinations for acceptance. Over 90% of graduates get into tier one Chinese universities and some get accepted into top universities in the U.S and U.K, an impressive record among the schools in Shandong province. It's ranked as the 44th best high school in China by Ameson Chinese High School Ranking.

The school has 165 full-time teachers, which includes 52 senior teachers, one national outstanding teacher, 16 Shandong provincial special-grade teachers and 92 Qingdao special-grade teachers. Most of them hold a Ph.D. or a master's degree.

It has been awarded the honorary titles of the "Shandong Province Model teaching school" and the "Provincial and Civilized Unit".

In 2015, the school has been accepted as a member of the "National Advanced Education Group", the highest national accolade for a public school.

In 2015, the school established an international department. Students in the international department can have two diplomas after graduation, one from Qingdao No.58 School and the other one from QiLu Sino-Canadian International school. Over the years, many students from the international department have been admitted into numerous great universities around the world.

== History ==
The school was founded in 1952, as Qingdao No. 5 High School. In 1969, it was renamed to Laoshan No. 1 High School. In 1994, it was renamed to Qingdao No. 58 High School. Now, it is a standardized school in Shandong province, and one of the Informatization Pilot Schools in China.

== International Cooperation ==
- With Darien High School in Connecticut, USA
  Students can visit the Darien High School for two weeks in the fall and a DHS delegation of students travel back to China in the spring through the school's student exchange program. In June 2007, HSBC Bank, which was about to open a branch in town, donated $12,000 to the program.
- With Willstätter High School in Bavaria, Germany
  Since 2001, Qingdao No. 58 High School has been in contact with Willstätter High School and built a strong relationship with it.

== Established-60-year anniversary ==
On October 6, 2012, Qingdao No. 58 School held a celebration due to its Established-60-year anniversary. The celebration is doomed to be involved in the history of Qingdao No. 58 School and be engraved on every students' and teachers' heart.
