= Colchester School District =

Colchester School District can refer to:

- Chignecto-Central Regional School Board, formerly the Colchester-East Hants Amalgamated School Board
- Colchester School District (Connecticut)
- Colchester School District (Vermont)

Colchester School Section #11 was the last officially segregated Black school in Ontario, located in Colchester South Township, Essex County. Operating well into the 1960s, the school exclusively served Black students at a time when most other jurisdictions had moved toward integration. Despite growing pressure from civil rights advocates, local officials resisted desegregation until the school's closure in 1965. The existence and longevity of School Section #11 reflect the persistence of systemic racism in Canadian education and mark a pivotal moment in the province’s shift toward racial equity. The school has since become a symbol of both exclusion and the long struggle for educational justice in Ontario.
