= Education in Bridgeport, Connecticut =

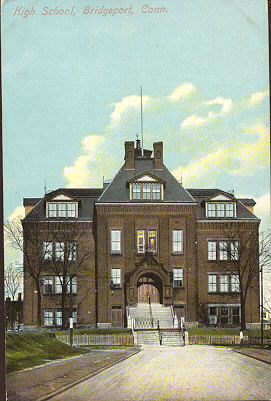
Bridgeport High School, about 1910 (the school, in a different building, is now Central High School)

Education in Bridgeport, Connecticut includes Bridgeport Public Schools, private and religious schools, a college, and a university. Bridgeport is home to the University of Bridgeport, Housatonic Community College, St. Vincent's College and the Yeshiva Gedola of Bridgeport. Gutchess College was a business school which went defunct circa 1920.

The city's public school system has 30 elementary schools, three high schools, two alternative programs and an interdistrict vocational aquaculture school. The system has about 23,000 students, making the Bridgeport Public Schools the second largest school system in Connecticut. The school system employs a staff of more than 1,700.

The Bridgeport public school district is ranked #161 out of the 165 Connecticut school districts. The city has started a school renovation and construction program, with plans for new schools and modernization of existing buildings.

== Higher education ==
- University of Bridgeport
- Sacred Heart University
- Paier College
- St. Vincent's College
- Housatonic Community College

== High schools ==
- Bassick High School
- Bridgeport International Academy
- Central High School, formerly Bridgeport High School
- Warren Harding High School
- Bullard-Havens Technical High School
- Kolbe Cathedral High School
- Fairchild Wheeler Interdistrict Multi-Magnet High School

== Catholic schools ==
- Kolbe Cathedral High School: Bridgeport's sole Catholic high school

Bridgeport is also home to several Catholic primary schools. They are St. Andrew, St. Ann, St. Augustine, and St. Raphael. They each serve as a campus of the Catholic Academy of Bridgeport (https://www.catholicacademybridgeport.org/).

== Elementary – Middle schools ==
- Adam J Lewis Academy

Barnum School

- Beardsley School
- Black Rock School
- Blackham School
- Bryant School
- Bridgeport Hope School, Private K–8th
- Cesar A. Batalla School
- Classical Studies Academy
- Columbus School
- Cross School
- Curiale School
- Dunbar School
- Edison School
- Hall School
- Hallen School
- High Horizons Magnet School
- Interdistrict Discovery Magnet School
- Geraldine Claytor Magnet Academy
- Geraldine W. Johnson School
- Jettie S. Tisdale School
- Madison School
- Luis Munoz Marin School
- Multicultural Magnet School
- Park City Academy
- Park City Magnet School
- Reed School
- Roosevelt School
- Waltersville School
- Wilbur Cross School
- Winthrop School
