= Central Connecticut Conference =

- Conference: CIAC
- Founded: 1984
- No. of teams: 30
- Region: Hartford County; Tolland County
- Official website: www.centralconnecticutconference.org

The Central Connecticut Conference (CCC) is an interscholastic athletic conference in the Greater Hartford region of Connecticut, United States.

== History ==
In July 1999 founding member Enfield High school would leave the CCC Conference to join the NCCC. E.O. Smith applied to join the CCC Conference in 1999 due to increasing enrollment, E.O. Smith would replace the departing Enfield high school. The Central Connecticut Conference or (CCC) went through major expansion in 2009 with a total of 32 schools participating in the conference. In the 2015–16 school year, Avon High School joined the CCC. This made the conference change back to three divisions of eleven teams, with a blue and a white section in each division, with one having five teams and the other having six. Avon High School moved from the NCCC, where they were the largest school. Some of their competitors were not large enough to have freshman and/or junior varsity teams for Avon to compete against, leading to their move. Avon High school would be replacing Fermi High School which closed its doors at the end of the 2016 academic year, Fermi would merge all of its sports with Enfield High school becoming one school. Also in 2016 Weaver High School a founding member of the CCC Conference in 1984, announced they would be leaving the conference at the end of the 2016-2017 academic year due to low student enrollment. More expansion continued in 2018 when Lewis Mills high school voted to leave the Berkshire league and join the CCC conference beginning conference play in 2019. Lewis Mills would be replacing Rockville high school who left to join the NCCC Conference for the 2017-2018 season. In 2024-25, Hartford Public left the CCC to join the Greater Hartford Conference.

== Membership ==
=== North ===
School	Location	Nickname	Colors
East Hartford High School	East Hartford, Connecticut	Hornets	
East Catholic High School	Manchester, Connecticut	Eagles	
Enfield High School	Enfield, Connecticut	Eagles	
E. O. Smith High School	Storrs, Connecticut	Panthers	
Glastonbury High School	Glastonbury, Connecticut	Guardians	
Manchester High School	Manchester, Connecticut	Red Hawks	
RHAM High School	Hebron, Connecticut	Raptors	
South Windsor High School	South Windsor, Connecticut	Bobcats	
Tolland High School	Tolland, Connecticut	Eagles	
Windsor High School	Windsor, Connecticut	Warriors	

=== Central ===
School	Location	Nickname	Colors
Avon High School	Avon, Connecticut	Falcons	
Bloomfield High School	Bloomfield, Connecticut	Warhawks	
Bristol Central High School	Bristol, Connecticut	Rams	
Bristol Eastern High School	Bristol, Connecticut	Lancers	
Conard High School	West Hartford, Connecticut	Red Wolves	
Farmington High School	Farmington, Connecticut	River Hawks	
Hall High School	West Hartford, Connecticut	Titans	
Lewis S. Mills High School	Burlington, Connecticut	Spartans	
Northwest Catholic High School	West Hartford, Connecticut	Lions	
Simsbury High School	Simsbury, Connecticut	Trojans	

=== South ===
School	Location	Nickname	Colors
Berlin High School	Berlin, Connecticut	Redcoats	
Maloney High School	Meriden, Connecticut	Spartans	
Middletown High School	Middletown, Connecticut	Blue Dragons	
New Britain High School	New Britain, Connecticut	Golden Hurricanes	
Newington High School	Newington, Connecticut	Nor'easters	
Plainville High School	Plainville, Connecticut	Blue Devils	
Platt High School	Meriden, Connecticut	Panthers	
Rocky Hill High School	Rocky Hill, Connecticut	Terriers	
Southington High School	Southington, Connecticut	Blue Knights	
Wethersfield High School	Wethersfield, Connecticut	Eagles	

=== Former members ===
School	Location	Nickname	Colors	Current conference
Bulkeley High School	Hartford, Connecticut	Bulldogs		Greater Hartford Conference
Fermi High School	Enfield, Connecticut	Falcons		Merged with Enfield High School
Hartford Public High School	Hartford, Connecticut	Owls		Greater Hartford Conference
Penney High School	East Hartford, Connecticut	Black Knights		Merged with East Hartford High School
Rockville High School	Vernon, Connecticut	Rams		North Central Connecticut Conference
Weaver High School	Hartford, Connecticut	Beavers		Greater Hartford Conference
