= Neil Cavuto =

American TV news anchor and journalist

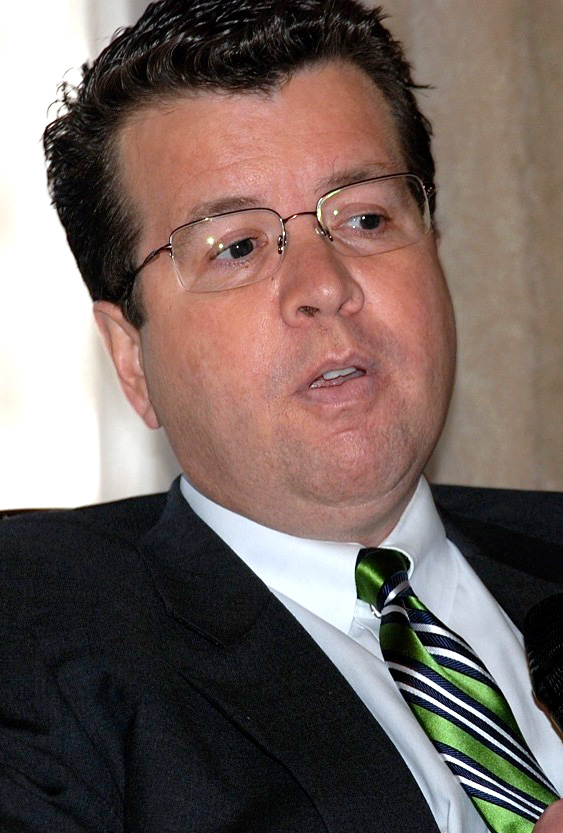
- Cavuto in 2007
- Born: Neil Patrick Cavuto; September 22, 1958 (age 67); Westbury, New York, U.S.
- Education: St. Bonaventure University (BA); American University (MA)
- Occupations: Broadcaster; journalist; commentator
- Spouse: Mary Fulling (m. 1983)
- Children: 3

Neil Patrick Cavuto (born September 22, 1958) is an American television news anchor, executive, commentator, and business journalist. He was the host of Your World with Neil Cavuto and Cavuto Live, both on Fox News, and Cavuto: Coast to Coast on sister channel Fox Business Network until he left the network on December 19, 2024.

== Early life and education ==
Cavuto was born in Westbury, New York, on Long Island, the son of Kathleen T. (Feeley), a United Nations staffer and homemaker, and Patrick "Pat" Cavuto, a can company sales executive. His father was of Italian descent, while his mother was of Irish ancestry. He was raised in Danbury, Connecticut, where he attended Immaculate High School. At 17, he became the manager of a fish and chips restaurant while attending high school. He worked as a White House intern during the Carter Administration. He graduated from St. Bonaventure University in 1980 with a bachelor's degree in mass communication, and earned a master's degree from American University.

== Career ==
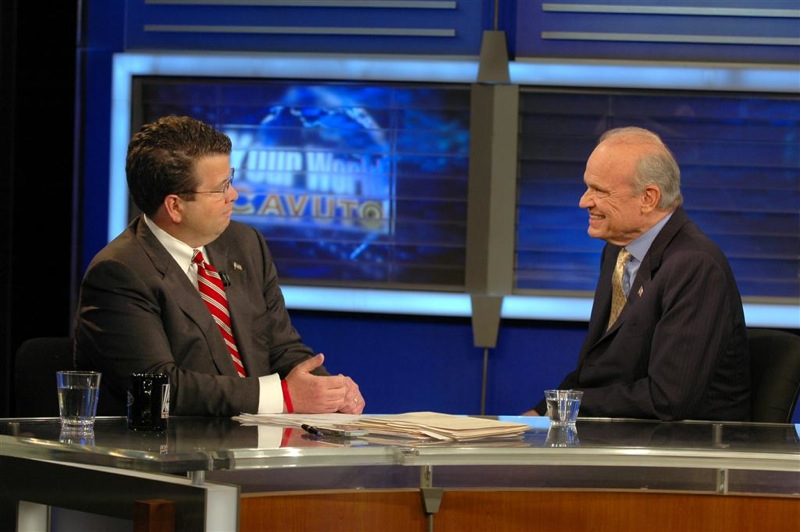
Cavuto interviewing Senator Fred Thompson in 2007

Before joining Fox, Cavuto was a principal anchor and reporter for CNBC. He co-anchored CNBC's initial broadcast on April 17, 1989. He hosted Power Lunch on CNBC, contributed to NBC's Today, and worked with the Public Broadcasting Service for 15 years reporting for Nightly Business Report. He was also a New York City bureau chief.

Cavuto joined Fox News in July 1996, and became host and managing editor of Your World with Neil Cavuto when the network launched in October. He became a vice president of FOX Business News in March 2006. He served all three positions concurrently. Your World was Fox's main business news program.

He has five nominations for Cable ACE awards. He is the author of More Than Money and Your Money or Your Life. Both books were New York Times best sellers.

A frequent critic of President Donald Trump, Cavuto has been labeled a "Trump skeptic" by NPR and The Daily Beast. In February 2020, Trump dedicated 20 minutes of a rally in Colorado Springs, Colorado, to attacking him.

On December 19, 2024, it was announced that Cavuto would be leaving Fox News after 28 years on air after declining to accept a new contract from the network.

== Personal life ==
Cavuto and his wife, Mary Fulling, whom he married on October 15, 1983, have three children. They live in Mendham Borough, New Jersey.

Cavuto has experienced numerous health problems, saying: "I don't hide that I have had a tough life in many respects. I fought back a near-life-ending cancer, only to end up with multiple sclerosis years later. Doctors have since told me that the odds of contracting both diseases in the same life are something like two million to one! Yet here I am, marching on, continuing to do my job when doctors who've examined my scans and MRIs tell me I shouldn't be walking or talking." As reported on June 22, 2016, by Charles Payne on Your World, Cavuto had undergone, and was recovering from, recent cardiac surgery. In October 2021, Cavuto tested positive for COVID-19. He had been vaccinated, and said: "Had I not been vaccinated, and with all my medical issues, this would be a far more dire situation. It's not, because I did and I'm surviving this because I did." He subsequently contracted the disease a second time, and was hospitalized with pneumonia. After recovering, he again praised the efficacy of vaccines and advocated their use.

== Authored books ==
- More Than Money. New York: HarperCollins. 2004. ISBN 0-06-009643-8.
- Your Money or Your Life. New York: HarperCollins. 2005. ISBN 0-06-082617-7.

== See also ==
- New Yorkers in journalism
