= Madison Elementary School (Bridgeport, Connecticut) =

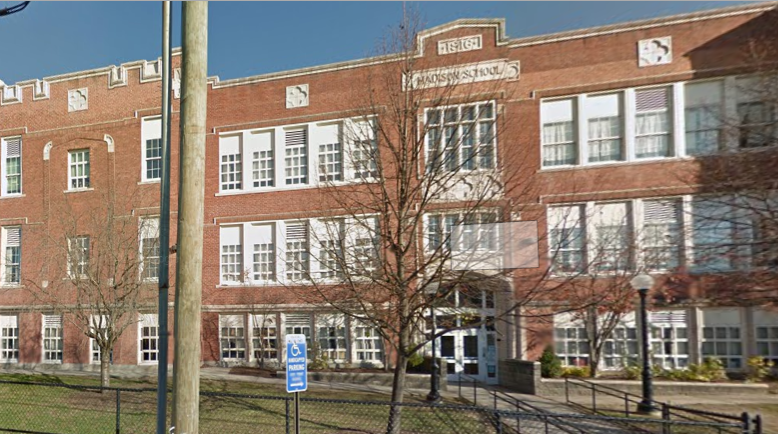

Location
- 376 Wayne Street, Bridgeport, CT 06606; United States of America
- Coordinates: 41.202685°N 73.208806°W

Information
- Opened: June 10, 1916; 107 years ago
- School district: Bridgeport Public Schools
- Grades: K-6
- Colors: Red and White(ish)?
- Team name: Madison Mustangs

Madison Elementary School is a public school located at 376 Wayne Street in the Bridgeport Public Schools District. Madison Elementary School was built in 1916 named after the fourth president under the United States Declaration of Independence, James Madison. It is considered one of the oldest schools in the Bridgeport Public Schools District.
