= St. Joseph High School (Connecticut) =

School in Trumbull, Connecticut, United States

St Joseph High School

Location
- 2320 Huntington Turnpike; Trumbull, Fairfield County, Connecticut 06611; United States; 41°15′42″N 73°9′54″W

Information
- Type: Parochial, Coeducational
- Motto: Privilege and Responsibility
- Religious affiliation: Roman Catholic
- Established: 1962 (64 years ago)
- Oversight: Diocese of Bridgeport
- CEEB code: 070797
- President: David J. Klein
- Principal: Nancy DiBuono
- Chaplain: Fr Ferry Galbert,
- Faculty: 100
- Enrollment: Approx. 820 (2018)
- Average class size: 18
- Campus size: 58 acres (230,000 m^{2})
- Campus type: Suburban
- Colors: Maroon and gold
- Mascot: Cadets
- Accreditation: New England Association of Schools and Colleges
- Publication: Amaranth
- Yearbook: Spectrum
- Tuition: $20,800 for the 2026-2027 school year inclusive of textbooks
- Website: www.sjcadets.org

St Joseph High School, is a private, Catholic high school in Trumbull, Connecticut. A four-year, co-educational college preparatory school, St. Joseph was founded in 1962 by the Diocese of Bridgeport. It is a self governing institution within the Roman Catholic Diocese of Bridgeport in Trumbull, Connecticut. It has approximately 830 students.

== History ==
Founded in 1962, St Joseph High School was run by the Marist Brothers and the School Sisters of Notre Dame. The following individuals have served as principals: Brother Edward Caffrey, Monsignor Richard Shea, Richard Bishop, Matthew Kenney, Kenneth Mayo, James P. Keane, and Nancy DiBuono (current principal).

== Catholic identity ==
St Joseph High School offers Mass each day in the Alumni Chapel located on campus. The school also boasts a full-time Chaplain, Fr. Férry Galbert. All students of St Joseph High School, regardless of religion, are required to take Catholic religion classes all 4 years.

== Service ==
At St. Joes, all students are required to reach a specific number of community service hours each year.

- Freshmen must earn 25 service hours
- Sophomores must earn 25 service hours
- Juniors must earn 25 service hours
- Seniors must earn 25 service hours.

.

== Athletics ==
St Joseph High School is part of the Fairfield County Interscholastic Athletic Conference (FCIAC). The school fields 49 teams in 19 sports, including cheerleading, cross country, field hockey, football, soccer, swimming and diving, volleyball, basketball, bowling, ice hockey, indoor track, wrestling, baseball, golf, lacrosse, outdoor track, softball, and tennis. The school also participates in co-op Teams with Trumbull High School for swimming and diving, ice hockey, and gymnastics. Since 1975, SJ athletic teams and individuals have won more than 100 championships.

In 2019, the St Joseph High School varsity football team became the first team to win three different Connecticut Interscholastic Athletic Conference (CIAC) state class championships (Class S, Class M, Class L) in three consecutive years.

In 2021, the St Joseph High School boys varsity golf team won both the Division III state championship during the spring season and the Division II state championship during the fall season after the state boys golf schedule was reorganized.

In 2023 The Girls Soccer Team completed an undefeated season and took home their second straight FCIAC title third straight state and finished the season ranked #6 in the country.

== Notable alumni ==
- Matthew Batten, Second Baseman for Atlanta Braves
- Lisa Lampinelli, comedienne/actress/motivational speaker
- Julia Marino, professional snowboarder, Member of 2018 USA Winter Olympic team, 5x Winter X Games Medalist
- Tyler Matakevich, Linebacker for Pittsburgh Steelers - Former AP All-American for the Temple Owls, winner of the Nagurski and Bednarik awards.
- Kevin Nealon, actor/comedian
- Timajh Parker-Rivera, basketball player
- Christy Carlson Romano, actress
- Jaden Shirden, Running Back for San Antonio Brahmas
