= Suffield High School =

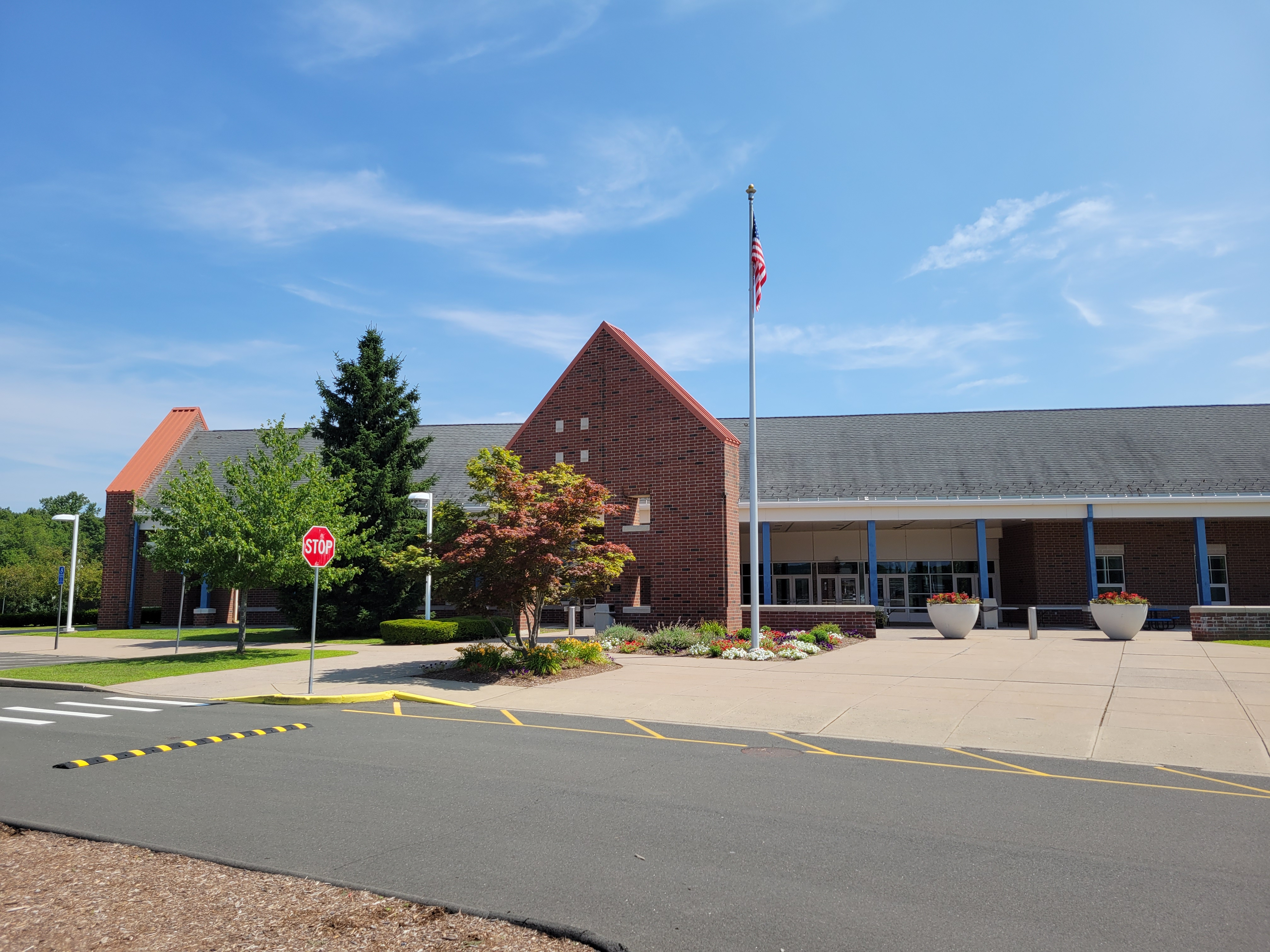
- Suffield High School

Location
- 1060 Sheldon Street; West Suffield, Connecticut 06093; United States; 41°58′50″N 72°41′33″W

Information
- Established: 1939 (87 years ago)
- School district: Suffield Public Schools
- CEEB code: 70760
- Principal: Anthony Hibbert
- Teaching staff: 58.93 (on an FTE basis)
- Grades: 9-12
- Enrollment: 640 (2025-2026)
- Student to teacher ratio: 11.59
- Colours: Blue and white
- Athletics conference: North Central Connecticut Conference
- Mascot: Wildcat
- Rival: Windsor Locks High School, Granby Memorial High School
- Accreditation: New England Association of Schools & Colleges
- Website: shs.suffield.org

Suffield High School is located in West Suffield, Connecticut, a town in Hartford County that abuts the Massachusetts border.

== History ==
The first Suffield High School building was constructed in 1939. It saw its first graduating class in 1940. A wing was added in 1956 to accommodate student growth and additional construction was done in 1961. That building is now known as McAlister Intermediate School.

The school's second building was constructed in 1965 and served through 2002, which is currently in use as Suffield Middle School. The third, and current, building, opened in fall 2002, and is located at 1060 Sheldon Street, West Suffield, Connecticut.

== Extracurricular activities ==
=== Athletics ===
Suffield High School participates in the North Central Connecticut Conference, and supports many varsity sports. Boys’ athletics include baseball, basketball, cross country, football (shared with Windsor Locks and East Granby), golf, ice hockey (shared with Windsor Locks and Granby), indoor track, lacrosse (shared with Windsor Locks), outdoor track, soccer, swimming (shared with Ellington), tennis and wrestling. Girl’s athletics include basketball, cross country, field hockey, golf, indoor track, lacrosse, outdoor track, soccer, softball, swimming, tennis and volleyball.

=== Agriculture program ===
Suffield High School has one of the largest agricultural education departments in the region. Enrollment for this program is competitive. This program, which acts as a regional magnet school, services students from surrounding towns such as Windsor Locks, Enfield, Canton, and several other towns in Hartford County. Enrolled students attend required curricular courses as well agricultural education courses over their four year high school career.
