= Westbrook High School (Connecticut) =

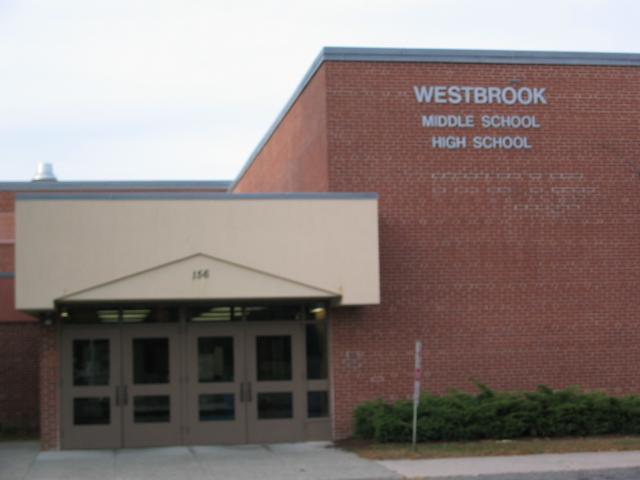

Location
- 156 McVeagh Road; Westbrook, Middlesex County, Connecticut 06498; United States
- Coordinates: 41°17′54″N 72°27′14″W

Information
- School type: Public, high school
- School district: Westbrook Public Schools
- NCES District ID: 0904980
- CEEB code: 070883
- NCES School ID: 090498001044
- Principal: Tara Winch
- Teaching staff: 26.47 (on an FTE basis)
- Grades: 9–12
- Gender: Coeducational
- Enrollment: 176 (2023-2024)
- Student to teacher ratio: 6.65
- Language: English
- Colors: Purple and white
- Athletics conference: Shoreline Conference
- Mascot: Knights
- Feeder schools: Westbrook Middle School
- Website: whs.westbrookctschools.org

Westbrook High School is a U.S. public high school located in Westbrook, Connecticut. The school serves grades 9 through 12, and usually enrolls between 150 and 250 students each year. Westbrook High School is a part of the Westbrook Public Schools. The school competes athletically and academically (e.g. High School Quiz Bowl) with many other shoreline high schools, and is well known for its music and theatre programs. It is located on McVeagh Road in Westbrook next to the St. Mark's Catholic Church.
