= Emmett O'Brien Technical High School =

Emmett O' Brien Technical High School

Location
- 141 Prindle Avenue; Ansonia, Connecticut 06401; United States; 41°15′08″N 73°02′42″W

Information
- School district: Connecticut Technical High School System
- CEEB code: 070003
- Principal: Laurie LeBouthillier
- Teaching staff: 54.00 (FTE)
- Grades: 9-12 and adult education
- Enrollment: 652 (2023-2024)
- Student to teacher ratio: 12.07
- Colors: Green and gold
- Mascot: Condor
- Website: obrien.cttech.org

Emmett O' Brien Technical High School, or O' Brien Tech, is a technical high school located in Milford, Connecticut. It is in the Connecticut Technical Education and Career System. O' Brien Tech receives students from many nearby towns.

== Technologies ==
In addition to a complete academic program leading to a high school diploma, students attending O' Brien Tech receive training in one of the following trades and technologies:

- Automotive Technology
- Carpentry
- Culinary Arts
- Electrical
- Hairdressing and Cosmetology
- Health Technology
- Heating, Ventilation and Air Conditioning (HVAC)
- Information Technology
- Mechanical Design and Engineering Technology
- Precision Machining Technology

== Athletics ==
Fall

- Football
- Soccer
- Volleyball
- Powderpuff

Winter

- Girls Basketball
- Boys Basketball

Spring

- Baseball
- Softball
- Outdoor track
- Golf
