= Bridgeport Public Schools =

School district in Connecticut, United States

Address
- 45 Lyon Terrace Bridgeport, Connecticut 06604 United States

District information
- Type: Public
- Grades: Pre K-12

Other information
- Website: www.bridgeportedu.net

Bridgeport Public Schools is a school district headquartered in Bridgeport, Connecticut, United States.

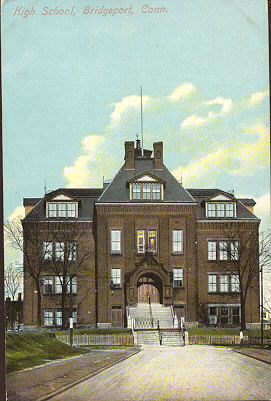
Bridgeport High School, about 1910 (the school, in a different building, is now Central High School)

The city's public school system has 30 elementary schools, three comprehensive high schools, two alternative programs and an interdistrict vocational aquaculture school. The system has about 23,000 students, making the Bridgeport Public Schools the second largest school system in Connecticut. The school system employs a professional staff of more than 1,700.

The city has started a large school renovation and construction program, with plans for new schools and modernization of existing buildings.

The current interim superintendent is Dr. Royce Avery.

== Public high schools ==
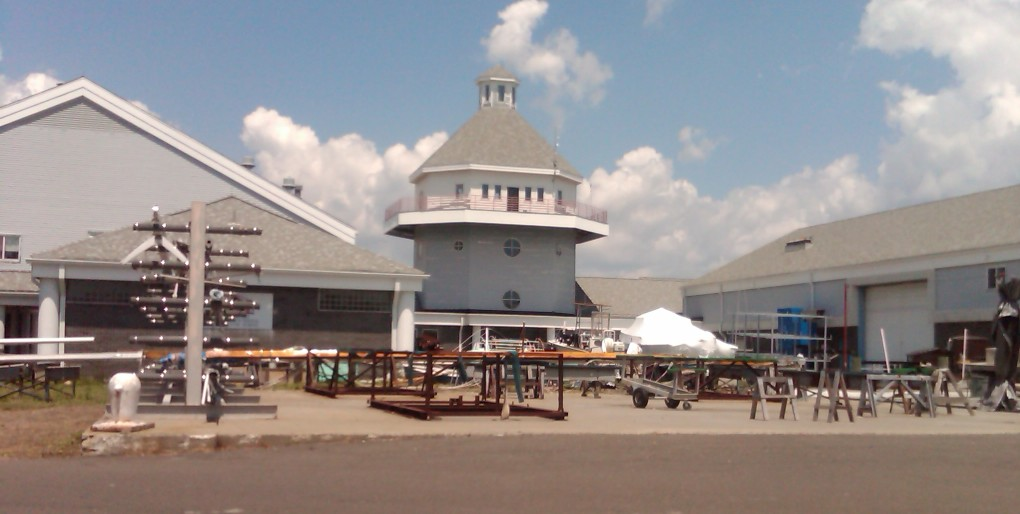
Bridgeport Regional Vocational Aquaculture School in 2010

- Bassick High School is former home to the Business Magnet. In 1924, the Bassick family home was demolished to begin construction for a school. The E & F Construction Company was awarded the contract after submitting a bid for $692,946. Architect Ernest G. Southey created a Georgian style plan set back 100 feet from Fairfield Avenue, leaving room to the south of the school for a large athletic field.

Bassick Junior High School opened in 1929 with 1,034 students in grades seven through nine and was soon thereafter converted to a senior high school. A new addition was built in 1968 at a cost of $3.5 million.

- Bridgeport Regional Aquaculture Science and Technology Education Center (BRASTEC) is located near historic Captain's Cove and is open to students from surrounding towns. It is one of the first schools in the country specializing in marine and aquaculture curriculum.
- Central High School, established in 1876, is home to Central Magnet, largest of the high schools.
- Fairchild Wheeler Interdistrict Magnet Campus, established in 2013, is home to three magnet schools: Aerospace/Hydrospace Engineering & Physical Science School, Biotechnology Research & Zoological Science School, and Information Technology & Software Engineering School.
- Warren Harding High School is home to the International Baccalaureate Program (IBO), and the Health Magnet Program in association with nearby Bridgeport Hospital plus St. Vincent's Medical Center on the north side of Bridgeport and the Bridgeport Manor. Its cornerstone was laid on May 10, 1924 by the widow of President Warren G. Harding, and the school opened on September 9, 1925. The school is named for then recently deceased President Harding.

== Elementary schools ==
- Achievement First Bridgeport Academy: Originally located on East Washington Avenue. This school is now located in the old Barnum School building on Noble Avenue.
- Barnum School: located on Noble Avenue; opened in 1892. Named after P.T. Barnum.
- Beardsley School: constructed in 1903 on Huntington Road, and originally named the Huntington Road School. Current name is for James Beardsley, who donated over 100 acres (0.40 km^{2}) of land to the city of Bridgeport in 1878.
- Black Rock School: established in 1841 on Brewster Street. Black Rock Elementary School is located in one of the historic sections of Bridgeport. The first public Black Rock School was built in 1841 and was located at the intersection of Grovers Avenue and Black Rock Avenue (present-day Brewster Street). It was a one-room structure heated by a Franklin stove. In later years, the Franklin stove was replaced with a pot-bellied stove. The students sat on planked benches. These benches were drawn closer to the stove on cold, winter days. It was customary at that time to have two-door entrances - one for the boys and one for the girls. The second public Black Rock School was built circa 1865 at the intersection of Brewster Street and Grovers Avenue. It was a two-story brown frame building with a belfry. Originally, all eight grades were taught there, four grades on each floor. An annual event was all grades posing for their school pictures. The present Black Rock School site was built in 1905. In 1911, a wing was added to accommodate the growing number of students. For many years, it was customary for elementary schools to have a fife and drum corps. Black Rock School was the first school in Bridgeport to have a band consisting of numerous brass and percussion instruments. After a fire damaged the school, it was renovated and a rededication program was held on May 13, 1977. Subsequently, Black Rock School was renovated again, which brought the school up to present-day standards and high technology usage for the school population. The rededication program was held on October 24, 1993. In 2015, a new wing was completed, including eight new state-of-the-art classrooms for kindergarten and first grade. There are computers in every classroom and WiFi throughout the building. Classrooms are equipped with Promethean board technology and each student has a district-provided device to use in school and at home. Black Rock School is now a Pre-K-8 elementary school.
- Blackham School: built in 1964 and opened February 1, 1965, Blackham School is located on Thorme Street. The school was named after Florence E. Blackham, who graduated from Bridgeport High School in 1887 and subsequently Bridgeport City Normal School in 1889. She taught at many Bridgeport schools over the course of many years, including Staples School from 1889 to 1890, Grand Street School in 1890, City Normal School from 1890 to 1892, Franklin School from 1892 to 1903, and Courtland Street School from 1903 to 1911. She also served as principal at Jefferson School and Kossuth Street School in 1911. In September 1915 she became the principal of Hall School, a position she held for 23 years.
- Bridgeport Learning Center (Sheridan): located on Tesiny Avenue; also known as the Bridgeport Learning Center at Sheridan
- Bryant School: constructed in 1912 on Maplewood Avenue, the school was named after poet William Cullen Bryant.
- Cesar A. Batalla School: constructed in 2006, located on Howard Avenue.
- Columbus School: Currently located at South End Elementary School at 160 Iranistan Avenue. Erected in October 1966 on George Street.
- Cross School: constructed in May 1959 on Reservoir Avenue; named for Governor Wilber Lucius Cross from 1931 to 1939 the 86th governor of Connecticut
- Curiale School: located on Laurel Avenue
- Discovery Magnet School: located next to the Discovery Museum and across from Fairchild Wheeler Golf Course on Park Avenue.
- Dunbar School: opened in January 1983 on Union Avenue replacing Abraham Lincoln School which operated from 1896 to 1969; named after Paul Lawrence Dunbar, African-American novelist and poet
- Edison School: located on Boston Terrace
- Geraldine Johnson School: located on North Avenue near the intersection of North Avenue and Park Avenue, opened in 2008. The school's namesake, Geraldine Johnson, was both the first female African American principal and the first female African American Superintendent in the city of Bridgeport.
- Geraldine Claytor Magnet Academy (formerly Longfellow School): erected on Ocean Terrace
- Hall School: founded in 1914 on Clermont Avenue, was named in honor of Lyman Hall who was an American Revolutionary War statesman
- Hallen School: constructed in 1922 on Omega Avenue; named after a former Board of Education member and Judge of Probate Edward F. Hallen
- High Horizons Magnet School: located on Palisade Avenue
- Hooker School: opened in September 1942 on Roger Williams Road named after Thomas Hooker
- Jettie S. Tisdale Elementary School: located on Hollister Avenue, opened in 2008
- Luis Muñoz Marín School: opened in January 1992 on Helen Street, named after Luis Muñoz Marín who was elected the first governor of Puerto Rico, while his father Luis Muñoz Rivera was the resident commissioner of Puerto Rico
- Madison School: originally built in 1916 named after the fourth president under the United States Declaration of Independence, James Madison
- Maplewood Annex School: located on Wells Avenue
- Maplewood School, aka Classical Studies Academy: located on Linwood Avenue
- Multi-Cultural Magnet School: opened in September 1980 on Palisade Avenue
- New Beginnings Family Academy: on Garden Street
- Newfield School: opened on November 6, 1906 on Newfield Avenue. Closed at the end of the 2005-2006 school year. District turned the building over to the city in September 2006. It is now the Bridgeport Police Department Training Academy at Newfield.
- Park City Academy: originally called Holy Rosary School and Barnum Annex, located on East Washington Avenue.
- Park City Magnet School; originally William Samuel Johnson Elementary School, which was being built in 1954 and opened in 1955, then Park City Magnet- North Campus School opened in 1979 on Chopsey Hill Road
- Park City Prep; 510 Barnum Avenue
- Read School: was constructed about 1915 on a North Avenue located then was torn down to allow for Route 8/25 connector in 1968, new location is on Ezra Street, named after David F. Read who served from 1890 to 1910 for the Bridgeport Board of Education
- Roosevelt School: located on Park Avenue
- Six to Six Magnet School; Pearl Harbor Street
- Skane Center: on Madison Avenue
- Swing Space School: located next to the University of Bridgeport campus
- Thurgood Marshall Middle School: a subschool of Six to Six on Pearl Harbor
- Waltersville Annex School: located on Polaski Street
- Waltersville School: located on Gilmore Street
- Whittier School: now closed, remains as an annex to buildings that have overflow kids, e.g. Howe, Longefellow
- Winthrop School; opened in 1955 on Eckart Street; named after John Winthrop, Jr. who once was a colonial governor of Connecticut, while his father John Winthrop, Sr. served as colonial governor of Massachusetts

== District Reference Group ==
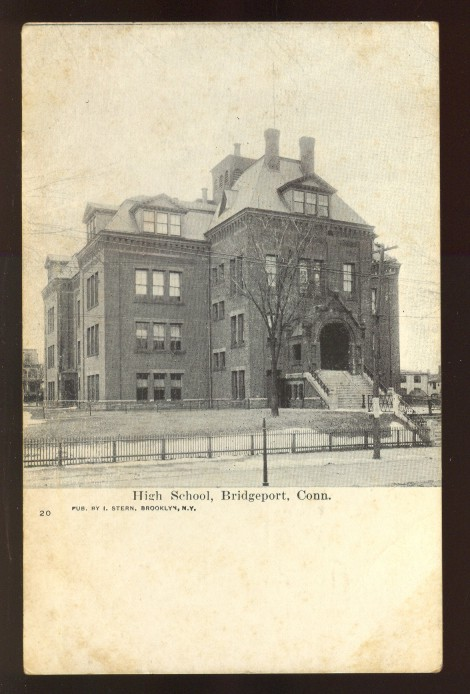
Bridgeport High School, about 1905

Bridgeport is one of the seven public school systems in District Reference Group I, a classification made by the state Department of Education for the purpose of comparison with the achievement levels of similar schools and districts. District reference groups are defined as "districts whose students' families are similar in education, income, occupation and need, and that have roughly similar enrollment". The other six school districts in the group are Hartford, New Britain, New Haven, New London, Waterbury and Windham.

== See also ==
- Education in Bridgeport, Connecticut
