= Ellington High School =

Public high school in Connecticut, U.S.

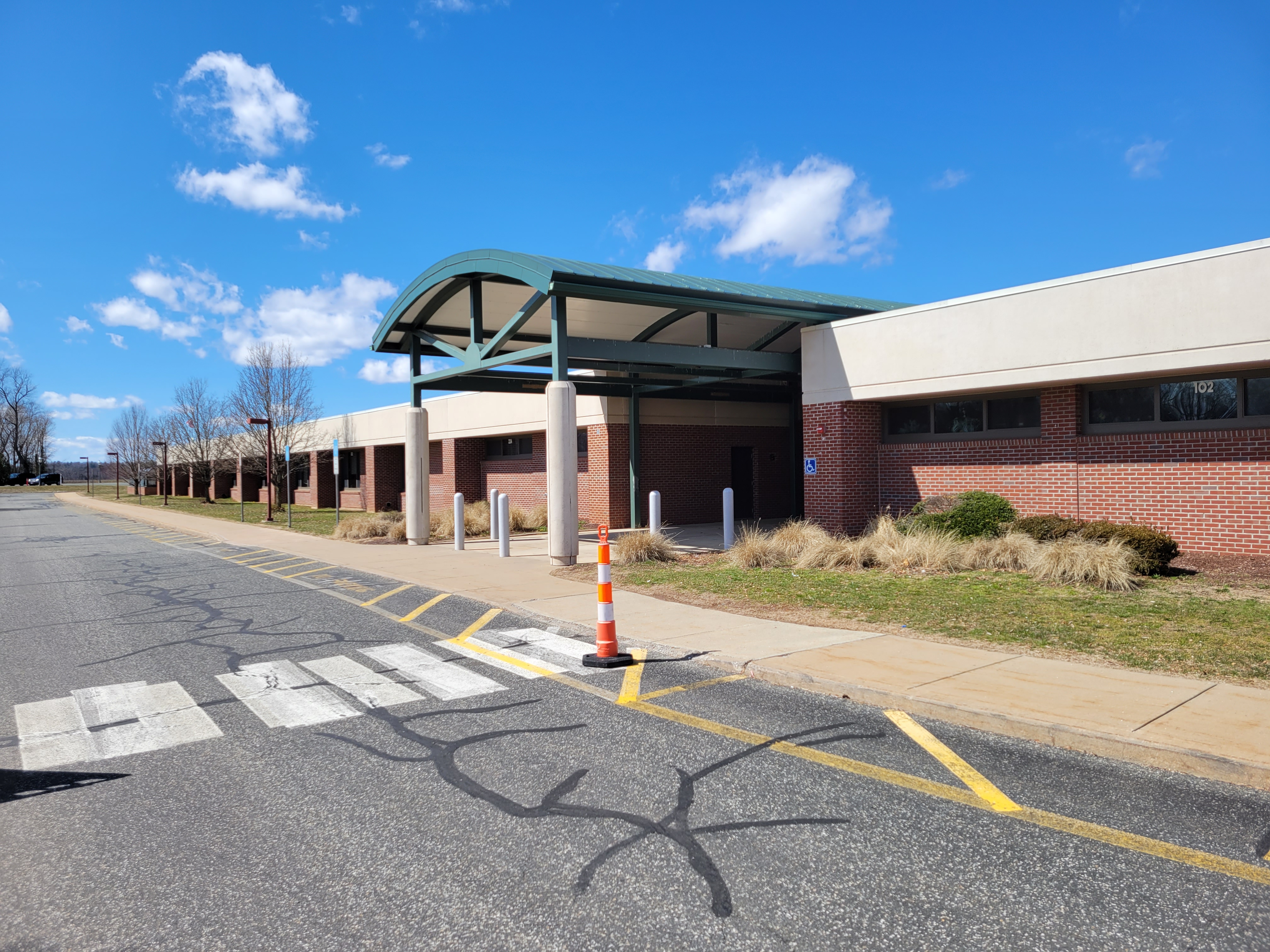
- Ellington High School

Location
- 37 Maple Street; Ellington, Connecticut 06029; United States
- Coordinates: 41°54′32″N 72°27′42″W

Information
- School district: Ellington Public Schools
- CEEB code: 070643
- Principal: John Guidry (2018-Present)
- Teaching staff: 67.48 (on an FTE basis)
- Grades: 9-12
- Enrollment: 716 (2023-2024)
- Student to teacher ratio: 10.61
- Colours: Purple and gold
- Athletics conference: North Central Connecticut Conference
- Mascot: Knight
- Website: hs.ellingtonpublicschools.org

Ellington High School is a public high school located in Ellington, Connecticut. The school teams are known as the Knights. Their colors are purple and gold. Ellington is a part of Ellington Public Schools.

== Athletics ==
=== CIAC State Championships ===
| Team | Year |
|---|---|
| Boys Soccer | 1971, 1972, 2007, 2008, 2014, 2022 |
| Girls Basketball | 1981, 1982, 1983, 1997 |
| Boys Cross Country | 1996, 2004, 2005, 2014 |
| Girls Cross Country | 2010 |
| Softball | 1977, 1979, 1981, 1984 |
| Girls Soccer | 1990, 1992, 1997 |
| Boys Golf | 1997, 2004 |
| Boys Outdoor Track | 1993, 1996 |
| Boys Basketball | 1963, 1972, 2025 |
| Baseball | 1971 |
| Boys Indoor Track | 2001 |
| Girls Outdoor Track | 2004 |
| Gymnastics | 2023, 2024 |
