= New England Jewish Academy =

Location
- 300 Bloomfield Avenue; West Hartford, Connecticut 06117; United States; 41°48′12″N 72°45′02″W

Information
- Type: Private
- Established: 1996 (30 years ago)
- CEEB code: 070889
- Head of school: Esther Eisenman
- Enrollment: 120
- Affiliation: Modern Orthodox
- Website: www.neja.org

New England Jewish Academy is a private Jewish PK-12 school in West Hartford, Connecticut, United States. The school was created by members of the New Haven, Springfield, and Hartford communities, and its students hail from communities throughout central Connecticut and western Massachusetts. The school is affiliated with the Modern Orthodox denomination but caters to a wide variety of Jewish backgrounds and religious affiliations.

From its opening in September 1996 until December 2010, the school was housed in the basement of the Agudas Achim Synagogue in West Hartford. In January 2011, the school moved into a newly constructed facility, located on Bloomfield Avenue in West Hartford across from the Zachs Campus and Mandell JCC.

== Campus ==
In June 2007, the school purchased the property across the street from the Greater Hartford Jewish Community Center. The property was previously owned by the University of Hartford and included the university's Alumni house. The school received zoning approval in November 2009 to demolish the Alumni House and build a 30,000-square-foot (2,800 m^{2}) school building in its place. An old carriage house on the property was also demolished, and a free-standing art and music center that resembled the carriage house was built in its place. The new building was designed to accommodate up to 120 students. The school moved onto the $6.8M campus over the course of December 2010, and the first day of classes in the new facilities was January 3, 2011.

The school's new main building features 11 state-of-the-art classrooms, three college-level science labs, a library and learning center, study and prayer space, and full-court gymnasium. The building was made possible through donations from Ann and Jeremy Pava, the Harold Grinspoon Foundation, and Doris and Simon Konover. The campus (Pava Educational Campus) and main building (Grinspoon-Konover Building) were named in recognition on their contributions. The Zachs family of West Hartford donated the art building, named the Louise Silverman Zachs Art and Music Center.

== School activities ==
Students participate in a dual-curriculum program that includes Judaic studies and general studies. Students also participate in a variety of clubs, such as dance and culinary arts, and extracurricular activities. These include a drama society that performs at Hartford Stage; basketball, soccer, ultimate Frisbee, and running programs; and school retreats and Shabbatons. Students are empowered to develop their leadership and social action skills. One example is the school's attendance at the Rally for Darfur in Washington, D.C., spearheaded by the students after they read Night by Elie Wiesel.

== Tuition ==
Tuition for the 2019-2020 year is $22,000. Breakfast is served daily, but students bring lunch from home. Subsidized transportation from Springfield, Massachusetts and New Haven, Connecticut is available.

== Post-Graduation ==
Virtually all students go on to four-year colleges after graduation, and HHNE students have been accepted to top schools such as Yale University, Princeton University, Cornell University, Cooper Union, Massachusetts Institute of Technology, University of Michigan, University of California, Los Angeles, Barnard College, Brandeis University, Boston University, New York University, Columbia University, Sarah Lawrence College, and Yeshiva University. Also, many choose to spend a year prior to college in Yeshiva/Seminary and university programs in Israel.
