= Darien High School =

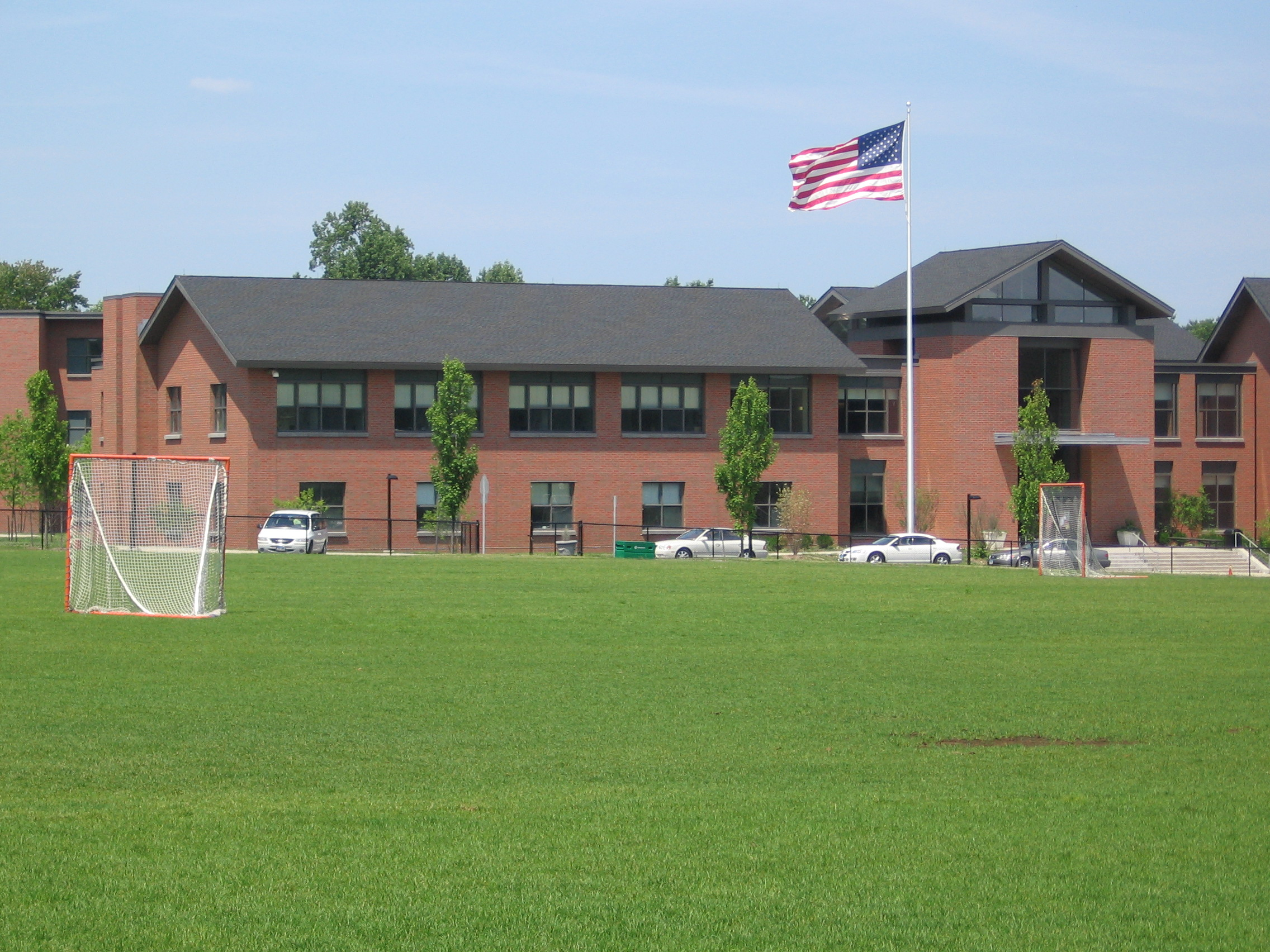

Location
- 80 High School Lane; Darien, Connecticut 06820; United States; 41°05′04″N 73°29′18″W

Information
- Type: Public
- Motto: Veritas vos liberabit (The truth will set you free)
- Established: 1927 (99 years ago)
- CEEB code: 070145
- Principal: Ellen Dunn
- Staff: 121.99 (FTE)
- Grades: 9-12
- Enrollment: 1,398 (2023-2024)
- Student to teacher ratio: 11.46
- Colors: Blue and White
- Mascot: Blue Wave
- Website: dhs.darienps.org

Darien High School is the single public high school serving the town of Darien, Connecticut, in the United States.

== Background ==
In 2014, Darien High School had the highest SAT scores in the state. In the 2004–2005 school year, Darien had the second highest CAPT score in the state and the highest Advanced Placement scores in the school's history, with a 100 percent pass rate on AP math exams and more than 85 percent of students earning the top score of "5." About one in three students in the school takes an AP math course.

Darien High School was specifically ranked 22nd in the nation for best STEM high school by U.S. News & World Report, a list of the top science, technology, engineering and math schools in the United States.

Of the 200 graduating seniors in June 2017, 13 won national recognition in the National Merit Scholarship Program, with 13 as "merit finalists" and three as National Merit Scholars.

For the purpose of comparison with the achievement levels of similar schools, the state Department of Education classifies schools and communities in "District Reference Groups," defined as "districts whose students' families are similar in education, income, occupation and need, and that have roughly similar enrollment." Darien is one of eight school districts in District Reference Group A (the others are Easton, New Canaan, Redding, Ridgefield, Weston, Westport, and Wilton).

The school's sports teams have won numerous state championships. Darien is known for its competitive football, lacrosse, ice hockey, field hockey, volleyball, and track teams.

A tradition at the school's graduation ceremonies is to present honorary diplomas to school teachers or administrators who are retiring. In 2007, they were presented to a school counselor and school librarian.

== Campus ==
The original high school building opened in 1927. A new building was built in 1960, and the former structure became Mather Junior High School. Upon the closing of Mather Junior High, the building became Darien's Town Hall.

The second high school building, on a 40-acre (160,000 m^{2}) site at 80 High School Lane, opened in 1960 and was torn down in 2005. The current high school, designed by Newman Architects of New Haven, was constructed from 2003 to 2005, opening in the fall of 2005. The project cost roughly US$76 million. Among the major innovations were the development of a collegiate campus-like setting of multiple inter-connected buildings, a green roof over the new cafeteria wing, and the introduction of a campus-wide wireless network and fiber-optic networking to all classrooms. Construction costs of the new building significantly exceeded the original budget, mostly due to the cost of asbestos removal from the old building.

== Athletics ==
DHS is part of the FCIAC, the Fairfield County Interscholastic Athletic Conference. The school's main sports rival is New Canaan High School.

Darien has one of the best high school lacrosse teams in the country, winning eight of the last 11 FCIAC titles, the 2005 Boys' Division I state championship, and the 2006, 2007, 2008, 2009 and 2010 CIAC Class M state championship. Darien's Boys' lacrosse team was ranked #4 in the country by the STX/Inside Lacrosse National High School Lacrosse Rankings in 2008.

The girls' field hockey team has won nine FCIAC championships in the past twelve years and eight state championships in the past ten years, in 2007, 2008, 2009, 2010, 2012, 2013, 2014, and 2016. They have also maintained the longest winning streak and undefeated streak in the nation at 93 games.

The girls' lacrosse team won the 2007, 2008, 2009, 2011, 2013, and 2014 CIAC Division I state championship.

The girls' volleyball team maintains a 100+ game winning streak in addition to numerous FCIAC and state championships.

The Boys Volleyball team was set up in 2006; it has a .810 win percentage and 6 State Championships (Class M 2008 and 2011 and Class L 2017, 2021, 2022, and 2023) and 8 FCIAC Championships (2011, 2015, 2016, 2017, 2019, 2021, 2022, 2023).

The girls' swim team has won over nine state championships and won FCIACs this past year.

The boys' track team won state class championships in the Indoor 2005 and 2006 seasons.

The boys' swim and dive team won the state championships in 2018.

These freshman (F), junior varsity (JV) and varsity (V) sports are offered at the school:

FALL

Cheerleading (V)
Cross country (JV, V)
Field hockey (F, JV, V)
Football (F, JV, V)
Soccer — boys and girls (F, JV, V)
Swimming — girls (V)
Volleyball — girls (F, JV, V)

WINTER

Basketball — boys and girls (F, JV, V)
Cheerleading (V)
Gymnastics — girls (V)
Ice hockey — boys (JV, V)
Ice hockey — girls (V)
Indoor track — boys and girls (JV, V)
Skiing — boys and girls (JV, V)
Squash — boys and girls (V)
Swimming — boys (V)
Wrestling — boys (JV, V)

SPRING

Baseball (F, JV, V)
Golf — boys and girls (JV, V)
Lacrosse — boys and girls (F, JV, V)
Outdoor track — boys and girls (JV, V)
Sailing (V)
Softball (JV, V)
Tennis — boys and girls (JV, V)
Volleyball — boys (JV, V)
Rugby (V)

=== Synthetic turf fields and stadium lights ===
The three grass oval fields in front of the school were turned in to turf fields and opened for use at the beginning of the 2016–2017 school year. A multimedia scoreboard, a ticket booth and concession area were also added. The Darien Athletic Foundation conducted the largest crowd sourced project in the town's history by raising private contributions to fully fund the project.

After years of public debate with school neighbors, stadium lights were turned on for evening game play on September 14, 2017.

A synthetic turf baseball field was installed at the high school in the summer of 2007. The DHS Baseball Field Project raised almost $1 million for the field (along with $1.08 appropriated by the Representative Town Meeting, $306,000 provided by the school district and $20,000 donated by the Darien High School Building Committee). Between the time the new high school building was constructed and the end of the 2006–2007 school year, the baseball field was unfit for use because of drainage problems and use of the field by other sports teams. The school's baseball teams had been playing on fields at Middlesex Middle School and at the Town Hall. In 2008 the turf was completed and played on for the first time.

== Theatre 308 ==
Darien High School's state-renowned theater program, Theatre 308, puts on three or more productions each school year, ranging widely in scope and time period. The Fall Drama is intellectual, contemplative, and intimate, while the Spring Musical is often a large-scale production targeted at the broader Darien community. Theatre 308's numerous Student Productions in the late spring are innovative, witty, and an all-around great time, offering a chance for students to fill the roles usually reserved for faculty members, such as the director. However, the Student Productions are not the only opportunities for DHS students to fill major production roles, as both the Drama and the Musical encourage students to serve as Stage Managers as well as technical designers for Sets, Costumes, Lights, and Sound. The Drama is especially well known for its use of extensive original music composition, direction, and live performance in many of its past shows. The organization as a whole has won numerous HALO Awards for its outstanding lead cast members, powerful ensemble, and amazing direction team, as well as several Sondheim Awards in similar categories. Its shows, ranging from Kiss Me Kate to Metamorphoses to Chicago to The Curious Incident of the Dog in the Night-Time, are beloved by the Darien public and widely attended.

== Student demographics ==
Ethnicity	Darien High School; 2017–2018	State Average; 2011–2012
White	88%	61%
Hispanic	6%	20%
Asian or Asian/Pacific Islander	5%	4%
Black	1%	13%
American Indian/Alaska Native	0%	0%
Two or more races	1%	2%
Hawaiian Native/Pacific Islander	0%	0%

== Notable alumni ==
- Lauren Acampora, novelist
- Dick Bertel, radio/television personality and broadcasting executive
- Garrett M. Brown, actor
- Wilson Cleveland, actor and producer
- Richard Crafts, murderer
- Topher Grace, actor
- Alex Kelly, convicted serial rapist
- Garett Maggart, actor
- Alex Michel, businessman, producer, and television personality
- Moby, musician
- Martha Peterson, CIA officer
- Joanna Scott, novelist, member of Post 53
- Chloë Sevigny, model and actress
- Chloe Humphrey, prominent collegiate women’s lacrosse player (University of North Carolina at Chapel Hill)
- Chris Shays, former Republican representative for Connecticut's 4th congressional district
- Mark Tinker, television producer and director
- Gus Van Sant, film director
