= Masuk High School =

- Old Masuk High School Mascot Logo

Location
- 1014 Monroe Turnpike; Monroe, Fairfield County, Connecticut 06468; United States; 41°20′55″N 73°11′39″W

Information
- Opened: 1959 (67 years ago)
- School board: Monroe Board of Education
- School district: Monroe Public Schools
- CEEB code: 070753
- Grades: 9-12
- Enrollment: 1,057 (2023-2024)
- Colours: Red, white, and black
- Athletics conference: South West Conference
- Mascot: Panther
- Rival: Newtown High School
- Accreditation: NEASC; CSDE
- Newspaper: Masuk Free Press
- Budget: $13,075,217.02
- Website: mhs.monroeps.org

Masuk High School is a public high school in Monroe, Connecticut, United States, and includes grades 9 through 12. It is located on Connecticut Route 111 (Monroe Turnpike) in Monroe, between Old Coach Road and Pond View Road. The school has a 25-yard indoor swimming pool and various successful clubs & sports.

== History ==
Since its founding in 1958 from 32 acres of land donated by Semyon Masuk,

In 1973, officials at the school allowed students to refuse to pledge allegiance to the American flag. The Connecticut Veterans of Foreign Wars objected to this decision.

Renovations were conducted in 1977 and 2004, the latter adding an additional wing.

In 2005, the gymnasium was renamed "David Strong Gymnasium." On May 9, 2017, the track surrounding the newly constructed turf field was dedicated as the Edmund Butler Track.

Since 2011, the addition has housed the Jockey Hollow STEM Academy for students grades 6 through 8.

In 2015, the U.S. Department of Education named Masuk a National Blue Ribbon School.

== Notable alumni ==
- Mike Gminski, Class of 1976, played basketball for Duke University, was selected in the first round of the 1980 NBA draft by the New Jersey Nets, played in the NBA for 14 years with the Nets, 76ers, Hornets and Bucks
- Jesse Schwartz, voiced Leo in Little Einsteins

== Extracurricular activities ==
- Community Crew: Unique to Masuk High School, Community Crew is a new student-founded club that helps students find local volunteer opportunities. It is partnered with many organizations in the area. It is available on the school's official website under "Community Service Opportunities" as a resource for students looking to help out nearby. At Masuk High School, community service is strongly encouraged and recognition is given at graduation for students who complete 100 hours.
