= Fairfield County Interscholastic Athletic Conference =

- Conference: CIAC
- Founded: 1961
- No. of teams: 16
- Region: Fairfield County
- Official website: www.fciac.net

FCIAC, the Fairfield County Interscholastic Athletic Conference, was established in 1961 and is made up of high schools throughout Fairfield County, Connecticut, United States. FCIAC hosts more than 100 combined championship/tournament games for all sports throughout the academic year. The conference comprises 16 schools.

== Member Schools ==
=== East Division ===
School	Mascot	Location	Colors
Central High School	Hilltoppers	Bridgeport, Connecticut	
Darien High School	Blue Wave	Darien, Connecticut	
Fairfield Ludlowe High School	Falcons	Fairfield, Connecticut	
Fairfield Warde High School	Mustangs	Fairfield, Connecticut	
New Canaan High School	Rams	New Canaan, Connecticut	
Ridgefield High School	Tigers	Ridgefield, Connecticut	
St. Joseph High School	Cadets	Trumbull, Connecticut	
Wilton High School	Warriors	Wilton, Connecticut	

=== West Division ===
School	Mascot	Location	Colors
Brien McMahon High School	Senators	Norwalk, Connecticut	
Danbury High School	Mad Hatters	Danbury, Connecticut	
Greenwich High School	Cardinals	Greenwich, Connecticut	
Norwalk High School	Bears	Norwalk, Connecticut	
Stamford High School	Black Knights	Stamford, Connecticut	
Staples High School	Wreckers	Westport, Connecticut	
Trumbull High School	Eagles	Trumbull, Connecticut	
Westhill High School	Vikings	Stamford, Connecticut	

=== Former members ===
School	Mascot	Location	Colors	Status
Bassick High School	Lions	Bridgeport, Connecticut		Independent (joining South West Conference in 2026)
Harding High School	Presidents	Bridgeport, Connecticut		Independent (joining South West Conference in 2026)
Trinity Catholic High School	Crusaders	Stamford, Connecticut		Closed

== Lacrosse ==
Coaches Guy Whitten (Wilton) and Howard Benedict (New Canaan) are believed to be the "Founding Fathers of Connecticut Lacrosse." In 2008 in Inside Lacrosse Magazine, Bates Head Lacrosse Coach, Peter Lasagna stated "Guy Whitten (Wilton) and Howard Benedict (New Canaan) created cultures of excellence to be envied."
