= South West Conference =

High school athletics conference in Southwestern Connecticut

- Conference: CIAC
- Founded: 1995
- No. of teams: 14
- Region: Fairfield County, Litchfield County, and New Haven County
- Official website: www.swcsportscenter.com

The South-West Conference is a high school athletics conference in Southwestern Connecticut. The conference comprises schools in Fairfield County, Litchfield County, and New Haven County

== History ==
Prior to the 1980s, high school sports leagues in Connecticut tended to be smaller than they are today and were composed of schools that were very close, geographically, and often represented student bodies that were fairly similar in composition. In the late 80s, as a result of an effort by the Commissioner of Education and the Superintendents of many of our school districts, a movement emerged to expand athletic conferences and have them represent schools of greater variety in terms of socio-economic population, racial and ethnic population, and geography. Numerous programs were developed to encourage closer cooperation between urban/suburban communities. As a result of this effort, a number of athletic conferences expanded.

With the expansion of conferences, many smaller conferences, previously able to schedule a full competitive sports schedule found they were unable to fill out schedules without an extraordinary amount of travel to distant schools. Two such conferences, the WCC (Western Connecticut Conference) and the CCIAC (Cross County Interscholastic Athletic Conference) had developed a close working relationship in order to meet their schedule commitments. In the early 1990s a group of representatives from each of the conferences met to discuss the possibility of formally joining to form one conference that would meet their respective needs. In 1994, an agreement was reached and began operations in the fall of 1995. The South-West Conference was born.

The South West Conference established two divisions for its sports programs. The Colonial Division members represent the larger schools; the Patriot Division members represent the smaller schools.

== Colonial Division ==
School	Mascot	Location	Enrollment	Colors
Bethel High School	Wildcats	Bethel, Connecticut	935	
Brookfield High School	Bobcats	Brookfield, Connecticut	902	
Frank Scott Bunnell High School	Bulldogs	Stratford, Connecticut	1,022	
Masuk High School	Panthers	Monroe, Connecticut	1,033	
New Milford High School	Green Wave	New Milford, Connecticut	1,294	
Newtown High School	Nighthawks	Newtown, Connecticut	1,441	
Pomperaug High School	Panthers	Southbury, Connecticut	1,145	

== Patriot Division ==
School	Mascot	Location	Enrollment	Colors
Immaculate High School	Mustangs	Danbury, Connecticut	406	
Joel Barlow High School	Falcons	Redding, Connecticut	827	
Kolbe Cathedral High School	Cougars	Bridgeport, Connecticut	276	
New Fairfield High School	Rebels	New Fairfield, Connecticut	698	
Notre Dame High School	Lancers	Fairfield, Connecticut	458	
Stratford High School	Red Devils	Stratford, Connecticut	1,051	
Weston High School	Trojans	Weston, Connecticut	798	

== Sports ==
=== Fall ===
- Cross Country
- Field Hockey
- Football
- Golf
- Soccer
- Swimming & Diving (Women)
- Volleyball (Women)

=== Winter ===
- Basketball
- Cheerleading
- Gymnastics
- Ice Hockey
- Indoor Track
- Skiing
- Swimming (Men)
- Wrestling

=== Spring ===
- Baseball
- Golf (Women)
- Lacrosse
- Softball
- Tennis
- Track and Field
- Volleyball (Men)

== See also ==
- Fairfield County Interscholastic Athletic Conference
