= Fairchild Wheeler Interdistrict Multi-Magnet High School =

Coordinates: 41.2251°N 73.1847°W

Fairchild Wheeler
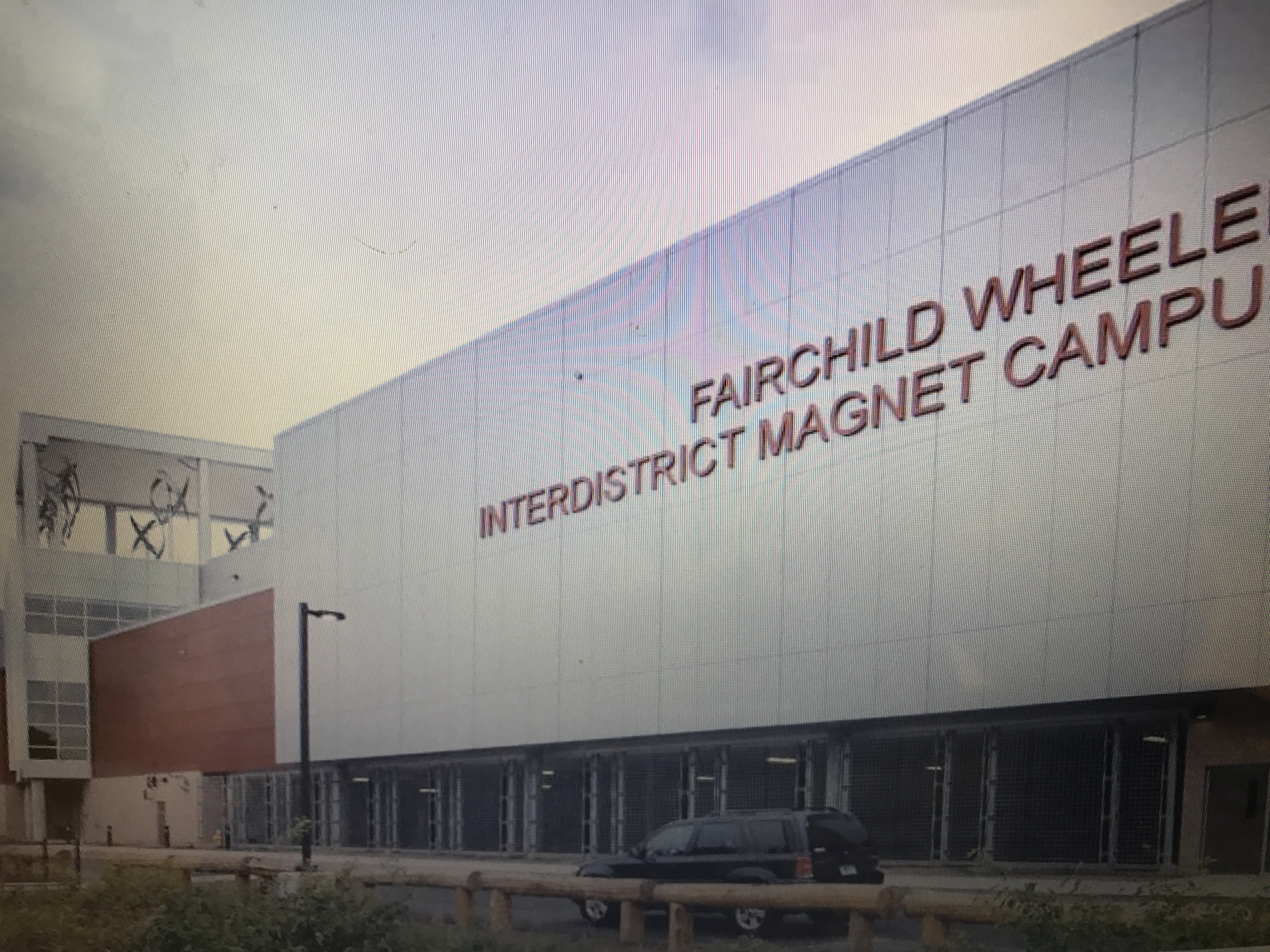

Location
- 840 Old Town Road; Bridgeport, Connecticut, 06606

Information
- Type: Magnet
- Opened: 2013
- Principal: Dave Henry
- Principal: Beswick Channer
- Principal: Christopher Johnson
- Assistant Principal: Jason Feeney
- Grades: 9-12
- Gender: Coeducational
- Enrollment: 1500
- Colours: Orange, Blue, Green
- Website: https://www.bridgeportedu.net/FWC

Fairchild Wheeler Interdistrict Multi-Magnet High School is a magnet high school located in Bridgeport, Connecticut. It has an enrollment of approximately 1500 students in grades 9 through 12.

70% of students live in Bridgeport, and 30% of students live in the following districts: Region 9 (Easton/Redding), Fairfield, Milford, Monroe, Shelton, Stratford and Trumbull.

== History ==
The high school cost $125.8 million to build, making it the most expensive school in the state of Connecticut at the time. Since it is a magnet school, the state taxpayers paid $119 million of the costs. The school was built on both Trumbull and Bridgeport's land, but the campus was later given to Bridgeport.

The first 203 Fairchild Wheeler graduates graduated in 2016.

== Multi-Magnet ==
Fairchild Wheeler is made up of 3 smaller high schools with their own field of study.

=== Biotechnology Research & Zoological Research ===
Principal: Mr. Beswick Channer

=== Aerospace / Hydrospace Engineering & Physical Sciences ===
Principal: Mr. Dave Henry

=== Information Technology & Software Engineering ===
Principal: Mr. Christopher Johnson
