= Grace S. Webb School =

School in Connecticut, United States

Coordinates: 41°45′00″N 72°40′55″W

Information
- Grades: K-12

The Grace S. Webb School, part of the Institute of Living (a psychiatric hospital) in Hartford, Connecticut, provides special education, clinical and related services to students who are in grades K-12.
