= Connecticut Association of Schools =

American educational governing body

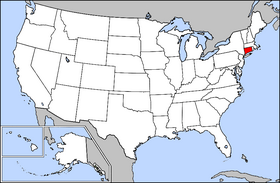
- Abbreviation: CIAC
- Formation: 1921
- Legal status: Association
- Purpose: Athletic/Educational
- Headquarters: 30 Realty Dr. Cheshire, CT 06410
- Region served: Connecticut
- Members: 1,100+ schools
- Executive Director: Glenn Lungarini
- Affiliations: National Federation of State High School Associations
- Staff: 18
- Website: casciac.org
- Remarks: (203) 250-1111

The Connecticut Association of Schools and the Connecticut Interscholastic Athletic Conference (CIAC) is the governing body for secondary school athletics and other interscholastic competition in the U.S. state of Connecticut.

== Sports offered ==
=== Fall ===
- Cross Country
- Boys Football
- Girls Field Hockey
- Golf
- Soccer
- Girls Swimming
- Girls Volleyball
- E-Sports (Partnership with PlayVS)

=== Winter ===
- Basketball
- Boys Ice hockey
- Indoor Track
- Boys Swimming
- Wrestling
- Cheerleading

=== Spring ===
- Boys Baseball
- Girls Softball
- Golf
- Lacrosse
- Tennis
- Outdoor Track
- Boys Volleyball
- Boys Rugby Union
- E-Sports (Partnership with PlayVS)

== Conferences ==
- Berkshire League
- Capitol Region Athletic League
- Central Connecticut Conference
- Connecticut Technical Conference
- Eastern Connecticut Conference
- Fairfield County Interscholastic Athletic Conference
- Naugatuck Valley League
- North Central Connecticut Conference
- Shoreline Conference
- Southern Connecticut Conference
- South West Conference

== See also ==
- List of high schools in Connecticut
- NFHS
