= Watertown Public Schools =

School district in Massachusetts, United States

Watertown Public Schools is a school district headquartered in Watertown, Massachusetts.

Circa 2019 the district had almost 2,600 students.

== Schools ==
Secondary:

- Watertown High School (WHS)
- Watertown Middle School (WMS)

Elementary:

- Cunniff
- Hosmer
- Lowell

Preschool:

- Early Steps Preschool
