= Immaculate High School =

Location
- 73 Southern Boulevard; Danbury, Connecticut 06810; United States; 41°22′57″N 73°27′12″W

Information
- Type: Private, Coeducational
- Motto: To Seek Truth is to Seek God
- Religious affiliation: Roman Catholic
- Patron saint: Saint Mary
- Established: 1962 (64 years ago)
- School code: 070125
- CEEB code: 070125
- Chaplain: Father Philip Phan
- Teaching staff: 63
- Grades: 9–12
- Enrollment: 405 (2020-2021, please note: numbers fluctuate)
  - Grade 9: 86
  - Grade 10: 91
  - Grade 11: 120
  - Grade 12: 107
- Average class size: 15
- Student to teacher ratio: 10:1
- Campus size: 7 acres (28,000 m^{2})
- Colors: Blue and white
- Slogan: Mustang Pride
- Athletics conference: South West Conference
- Mascot: Mustang
- Nickname: IHS, affectionately known as Immac
- Team name: Mustangs
- Accreditation: New England Association of Schools and Colleges
- Publication: Mustang Monthly Newsletter
- Yearbook: The Crescent
- Website: www.immaculatehs.org

Immaculate High School is a private, Roman Catholic high school in Danbury, Connecticut, United States. Overseen by the Diocese of Bridgeport, IHS serves residents of 28 towns in the greater Danbury area. Immaculate High School, established in 1962, enrolls roughly 400 students of any gender.

== Athletics ==
The Mustang athletic program belongs to the South West Conference and competes in class "S" in most sports. There are 12 varsity sports for men and 13 varsity sports for women.

The school's campus has a turf field, installed in 2006, used for football, lacrosse, track, soccer, field hockey and physical education class when weather permits. A new track is also available. The school facility houses a 950-seat gymnasium, a weight room, and a designated wrestling area.

== Notable alumni ==
- Abby Elliott - actress
- Neil Cavuto - TV commentator
