= New Canaan High School =

Coordinates: 41.1288°N 73.4895°W

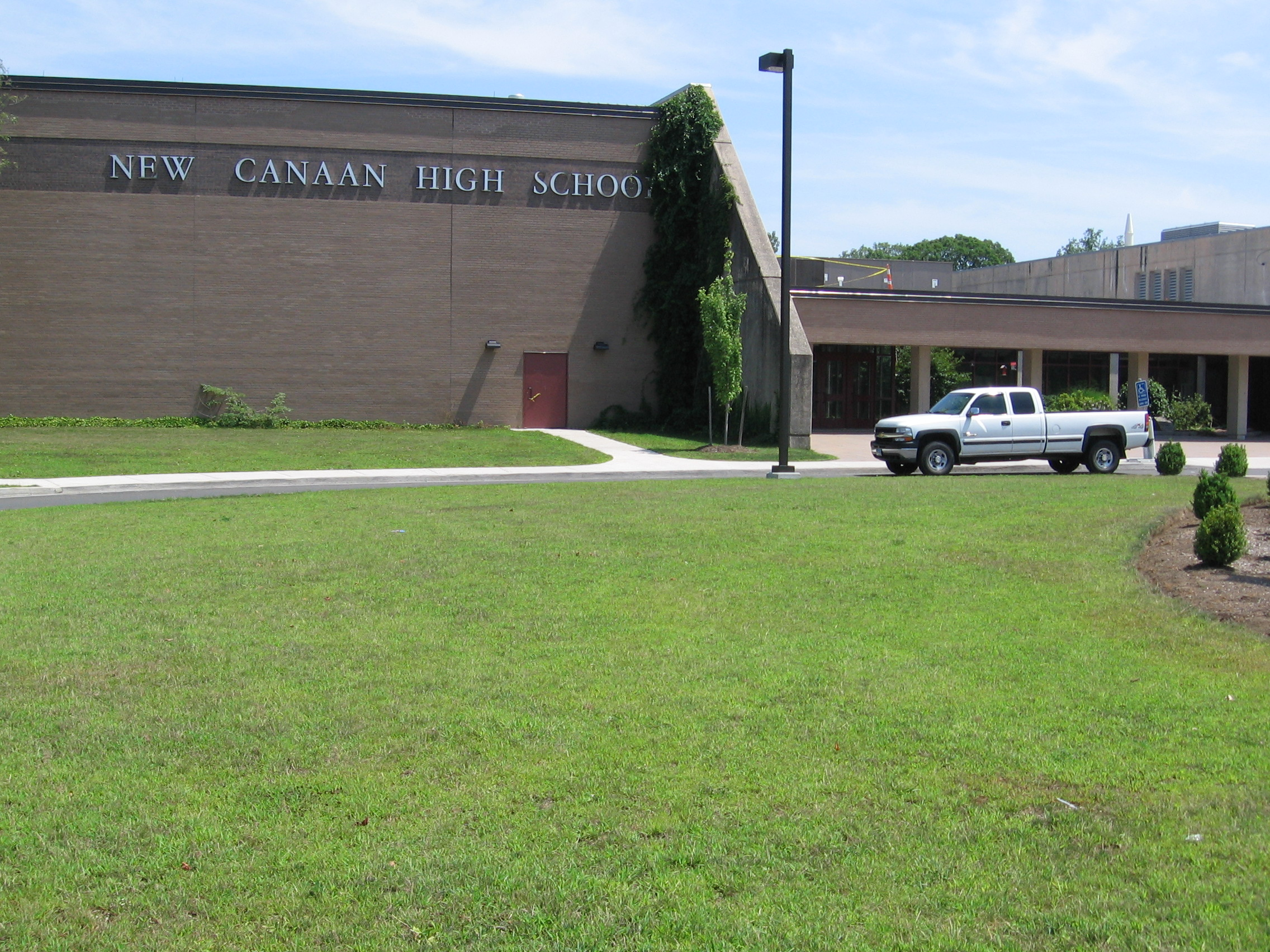

Location
- 11 Farm Road; New Canaan, Connecticut 06840; United States

Information
- Type: Public
- CEEB code: 070465
- Principal: William Egan
- Staff: 103.97 (FTE)
- Enrollment: 1,257 (2023-2024)
- Student to teacher ratio: 12.09
- Colors: Red and black
- Mascot: Rams
- Website: www.ncps-k12.org/o/nchs

New Canaan High School is a public high school in New Canaan, Connecticut, United States.

In 2017, it was ranked the best public high school in Connecticut, and one of the top 200 in the nation. New Canaan High School was ranked the 74th best STEM high school in the nation by U.S. News & World Report.

The school is a part of the Fairfield County Interscholastic Athletic Conference, otherwise known as the FCIAC. The New Canaan Rams have won numerous state championships. New Canaan fields football, lacrosse, ice hockey, swimming, and tennis teams. Its football team holds 22 state championships and is consistently a top 10 team in the state. In 2016, its boys' lacrosse team was ranked 3rd in the nation.

== History ==
Construction on the current school building was finalized in 1971. The school is located on grounds donated by the Lapham family, carving off approximately 46 acres of Waveny Park.

In 2007, the school completed a multi-year, $60+ million renovation. An additional $14 million was spent on asbestos abatement, a portion of which was reimbursed through the settlement of an asbestos-related lawsuit.

In 2010, New Canaan High School won the National Library of the Year award from the American Association of School Librarians.

In August 2018, a pair of cafeteria worker sisters were arrested and accused of stealing about $500,000 from the cafeterias of NCHS and Saxe Middle School over a five-year period. The school received nationwide attention for the arrests.

== Athletics ==
New Canaan High School is part of the Fairfield County Interscholastic Athletic Conference (FCIAC). School teams have won state championships in football, lacrosse, soccer, basketball, swimming, golf, tennis, track and field, and cross country.

=== Football ===
The school's football team, dubbed the Rams, has been led to 15 State Championships by coach Lou Marinelli, whose overall record at New Canaan is 395 wins, 107 losses, and 6 draws.

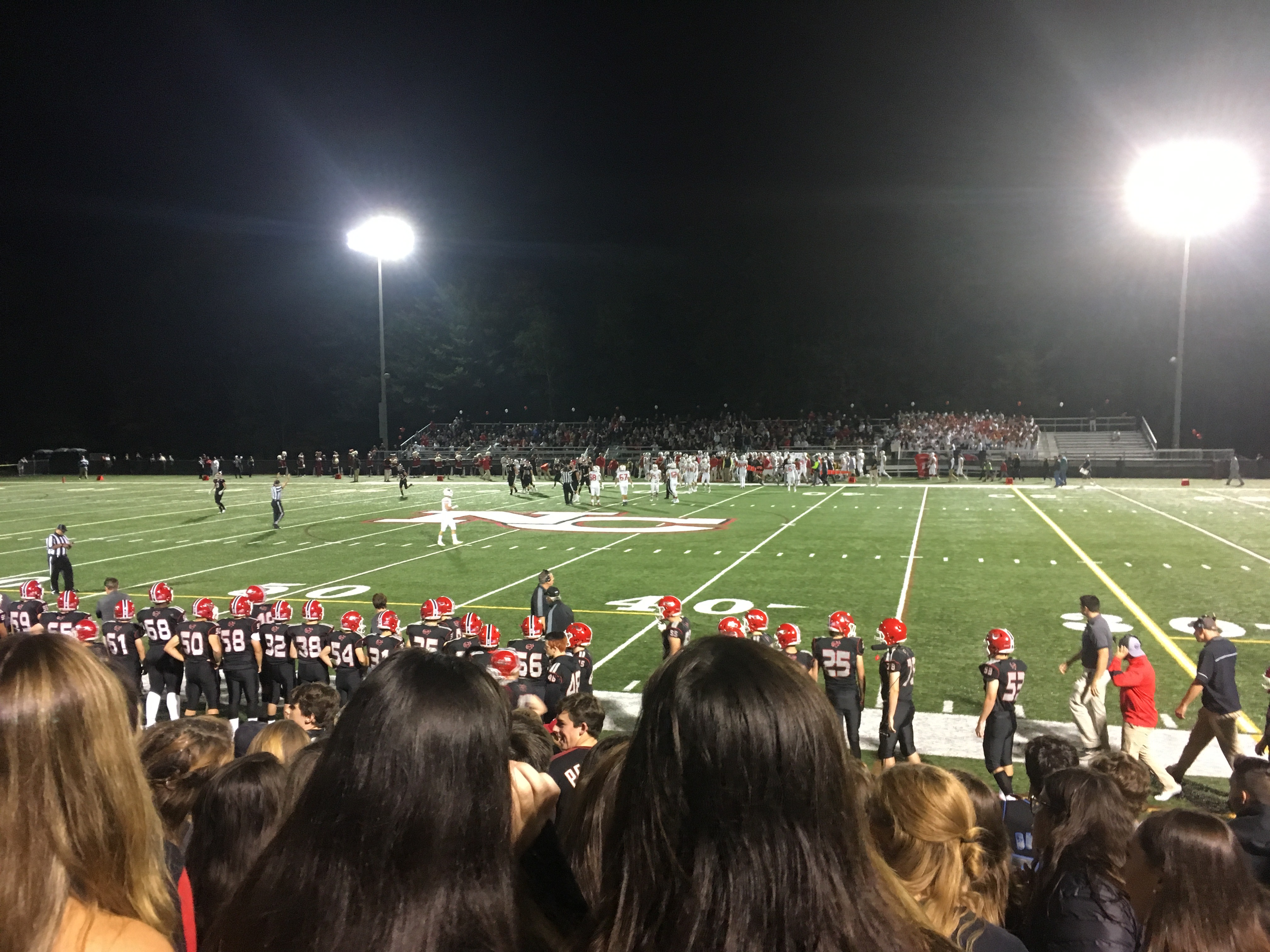
Football Game at NCHS

=== Basketball ===
On January 10, 2019, one of the school's players, Ryan McAleer, made national headlines when he intercepted the ball from Stamford High midair with 0.9 seconds on the clock, then made a basket from half court, winning the game. Also in 2019, the team won the Connecticut Interscholastic Athletic Conference (CIAC) Division IV championship for the first time since 1962, defeating Granby Memorial High School 55–39. The boys' basketball team also earned CIAC class-level titles six times.

== Notable alumni ==
- Zach Allen (class of 2015), football defensive lineman
- Tyler Kendall (Class of 2014), Washington Correspondent, Bloomberg Television
- Andrew Campbell (Class of 2010), Olympic rower
- Curt Casali (Class of 2007), professional baseball catcher
- Alex Coco (Class of 2008), producer and Oscar winner
- Charlie Cole, Olympic rower
- Michael Covino (Class of 2003), film director, screenwriter, producer, and actor
- Ann Coulter (Class of 1980), conservative social and political commentator
- Peter Demmerle (Class of 1971), Notre Dame Fighting Irish football player
- Will Hanley (Class of 2008), basketball player
- Katherine Heigl (Class of 1997), actress, film producer, and former fashion model
- Edward Keating (Class of 1974), photojournalist
- Michael McCusker (Class of 1984), film editor
- Martin Mull (Class of 1961), actor
- Lucas Niang (Class of 2016), football offensive tackle
- Max Pacioretty (2007 - transferred), professional hockey left winger
- Drew Pyne (Class of 2020), football player
- Bill Roorbach (Class of 1971), author of short stories
- Bill Toomey (Class of 1957), athlete and 1968 Olympic decathlon champion
- Monroe Trout (born 1962), formerly American, hedge fund manager
- Jon Vitti (Class of 1977), writer best known for his work on the television series The Simpsons
- Sid Yudain (Class of 1941), journalist who founded Roll Call
