= Windsor Public Schools =

School district in Connecticut, United States

Address
- 601 Matianuck Avenue Windsor, Connecticut 06095 United States

District information
- Type: Public
- Grades: Pre-K-12
- Superintendent: Dr. Terrell Hill

Other information
- Teachers' unions: AFT Connecticut; Connecticut Education Association

Windsor Public Schools is a school district in Windsor, Connecticut, United States.

== Schools ==
=== High School ===
- Windsor High School

=== Middle school ===
- Sage Park Middle School

=== Elementary schools ===
- Clover Street School
- John F. Kennedy School
- Oliver Ellsworth School
- Poquonock School
