= Ellington Public Schools =

School district in Connecticut, United States

Address
- 47 Main Street Ellington, Connecticut, 06029; United States

District information
- Grades: Pre-school - 12
- Superintendent: Scott V. Nicol
- Enrollment: 2,228

Other information
- Website: Ellington Public Schools

Ellington Public Schools is a public school district in Tolland County, Connecticut, United States, based in Ellington, Connecticut.

== Schools ==
The Tolland County School District has three elementary schools, one middle school, and one high school.

=== Elementary schools ===
- Crystal Lake Elementary School
- Center Primary School
- Windermere Elementary School

=== Middle school ===
- Ellington Middle School

=== High School ===
- Ellington High School
