= Monroe Public Schools (Connecticut) =

School district in Connecticut, United States

Address
- 375 Monroe Turnpike Monroe, Connecticut 06468 United States

Other information
- Website: https://monroeps.org/

Monroe Public Schools is a school district in Monroe, Connecticut, United States.

== Schools ==
=== High schools ===
- Masuk High School

=== Middle schools ===
- Chalk Hill Middle School (reopened December 19, 2012 as a temporary facility for Sandy Hook Elementary School students; it had to be evacuated on Wednesday, October 1, 2014, due to a bomb threat) (Closed Forever)
- Jockey Hollow Middle School. It has 2 campuses, Jockey Hollow Main Campus and STEM Academy at Masuk High School

=== Elementary schools ===
- Early Intervention Center (preschool)
- Fawn Hollow Elementary School
- Monroe Elementary School
- Pre-First Program
- Stepney Elementary School
