= Consolidated School District of New Britain =

School district in Connecticut, United States

Address
- 272 Main Street New Britain, Connecticut 06050 United States

District information
- Type: Public
- Grades: Pre K-12
- Superintendent: Dr. Tony Gasper

The Consolidated School District of New Britain, also known as New Britain Public Schools, is a school district headquartered in New Britain, Connecticut, United States. The district serves approximately 10,000 students.

== Schools ==
=== High schools ===
- New Britain High School

=== Middle schools ===
- DiLoreto Magnet School (K-8)
- House of Arts Letters and Sciences Academy (HALS Academy) (magnet)
- Louis P. Slade Middle School
- Pulaski Middle School

=== Primary schools ===
- Chamberlain Primary School
- DiLoreto Magnet School (K-8)
- Gaffney Elementary School
- Holmes Elementary School
- Jefferson Elementary School
- Lincoln Elementary School
- Northend Elementary School
- Smalley Academy
- Smith Elementary School
- Vance Village Elementary School
