= Suffield Public Schools =

School district in Connecticut, United States

Coordinates: 41.9835°N 72.6638°W

Address
- 350 Mountain Road Suffield, Connecticut 06078 United States

District information
- Type: Public
- Grades: PreK–12
- Superintendent: Matthew Dunbar
- Schools: 4

Students and staff
- Students: 2,038 (2023–24)
- Teachers: 170.95 (on FTE basis)
- Student–teacher ratio: 11.92
- Athletic conference: North Central Connecticut Conference
- District mascot: Wildcat
- Colors: white and blue

Other information
- Website: www.suffield.org

The Suffield Public Schools system is a school district based in Suffield, Connecticut, United States.

It includes A. Ward Spaulding Elementary School, McAlister Intermediate School, Suffield Middle School, and Suffield High School.

It is known for the high school's agricultural science program, which draws students from the surrounding area.
