= Shelton Public Schools =

School district in Connecticut, United States

Address
- 382 Long Hill Avenue Shelton, Connecticut, 06484; United States

District information
- Type: Public
- Grades: Pre-Kindergarten–12
- Superintendent: Kenneth Saranich
- School board: Board of Education
- Schools: 8
- Budget: $72,765,000 (FY20–21)
- NCES District ID: 0904050

Students and staff
- Students: 4,654 (2019–2020)
- Teachers: 335.50 (on FTE (full-time equivalent) basis) (2019–2020)
- Student–teacher ratio: 13.87 to 1 (2019–2020)

Other information
- Website: www.sheltonpublicschools.org

Shelton Public Schools is a school district in Shelton, Connecticut, United States. The district is located in the eastern Fairfield County. The superintendent of Shelton Public schools is Kenneth Saranich. Shelton Public Schools currently operates four K-4 elementary schools (see below), one upper elementary school (Perry Hill School - grades 5 and 6), an intermediate school (Shelton Intermediate School - grades 7 and 8), and one high school (Shelton High School). The Board of Education offices were moved to 382 Long Hill Avenue after the Ripton school closed and was renovated to accommodate the Board of Education offices.

== Schools ==
List of schools
School	Type	Grades	Enrollment (year)	Teaching staff (year)	Website
Shelton High School	High school	9–12	1,356 (2019-2020)	99.40 (2019-2020)	Official website
Shelton Intermediate School	Middle school	7–8	777 (2019-2020)	64.70 (2019-2020)	Official website
Perry Hill School	Upper elementary	5–6	727 (2019-2020)	52.00 (2019-2020)	Official website
Booth Hill School	Elementary	K–4	323 (2019-2020)	22.70 (2019-2020)	Official website
Elizabeth Shelton School	Elementary	K–4	423 (2019-2020)	29.00 (2019-2020)	Official website
Long Hill School	Elementary	K–4	360 (2019-2020)	27.20 (2019-2020)	Official website
Mohegan School	Elementary	K–4	358 (2019-2020)	23.00 (2019-2020)	Official website
Sunnyside School	Elementary	K–4	254 (2019-2020)	18.70 (2019-2020)	Official website

=== Perry Hill School ===
Perry Hill School reopened as an upper elementary school in 2010 after being a K-4 school. The building was renovated to accommodate a larger school population. Originally the school housed Shelton High School (built in 1969) and later Shelton Intermediate School (until 2001)
