= Torrington School District =

School district in Connecticut, United States

Address
- 355 Migeon Avenue Torrington, Connecticut, 6790; United States

District information
- Type: Public
- Grades: PreK–12
- NCES District ID: 0904590

Students and staff
- Students: 3,636 (2020–2021)
- Teachers: 275.0 (on an FTE basis)
- Staff: 397.9 (on an FTE basis)
- Student–teacher ratio: 13.22:1

Other information
- Website: www.torrington.org

The Torrington School District is a school district serving the city of Torrington in Litchfield County, Connecticut.

Torrington Public Schools operates under the leadership of Superintendent Cheryl Kloczko and a board of education that consists of 10 elected members and the city mayor, who acts as the chairman ex officio. The district served 4,988 students in the 2004–2005 school year.

== TPS About/Honors and awards ==
As of 2020 Torrington Public Schools (TPS) is the largest school district in Litchfeild County, Torrington enrolls over 5,000 students grades pre-k through 12. Torrington teachers receive state level recognition, having been selected for awards such as State Teacher of the Year, Outstanding Teacher of the Gifted and Outstanding Middle School Art Teacher. The district has been nationally ranked eight times as "One of the Best One Hundred Communities for Music Education" in the country.

== Torrington Public Schools ==
=== High school (THS) ===
- Torrington High School

Torrington High School students have been accepted at competitive colleges and universities across the country.

=== Middle schools (TMS) ===
- Torrington Middle School

=== Forbes School ===
- Forbes School

=== Southwest School ===
- Southwest School

=== Torringford School ===
- https://torringford.torrington.org/ Torringford School]

=== Vogel-Wetmore School ===
- Vogel-Wetmore School

=== Special schools and programs ===
- Alternate Special Education Programs (formerly Southeast School)
- Homebound instruction
