= Westbrook Public Schools =

School district in Connecticut, United States

Location
- 158 McVeagh Road, Westbrook (Middlesex County) Connecticut 06498 United States
- Coordinates: 41.297638°N 72.453956°W

District information
- Type: Public
- Grades: Pre-Kindergarten to 12
- Superintendent: Kristina Martineau
- Schools: 3
- Budget: $21,761,000 (2023-24)
- NCES District ID: 0904980

Students and staff
- Students: 597 (2023-24)
- Teachers: 80.37 (on an FTE basis) (2023-24)
- Staff: 100.28 (2023-24)
- Student–teacher ratio: 7.43 (2023-24)

Other information
- Website: www.westbrookctschools.org

Westbrook Public Schools is a school district serving Westbrook, Connecticut. The district comprises three schools located on two different campuses, the middle and high schools being attached. Daisy Ingraham Elementary School serves grades PK-4; Westbrook Middle School serves grades 5-8; and Westbrook High School serves grades 9-12. In the 2023-24 school year, the student body makeup was 69.8% white, 25.8% Hispanic/Latino, 1.7% Asian/Pacific Islander, and 0.7% Black.

Kristina Martineau became Superintendent in December 2020. Previous Superintendents include Patricia Ciccone (2012-2020); Patricia Charles (2006-2012); Carol Parmalee-Blancato (interim 2006); John Sullivan (1998-2005); Dalton Marks (1991-1998); and Robert Schreck (1978-1991). Arnold Oliver was the first Superintendent of Schools, serving from 1962 to 1978.
