= New Britain High School =

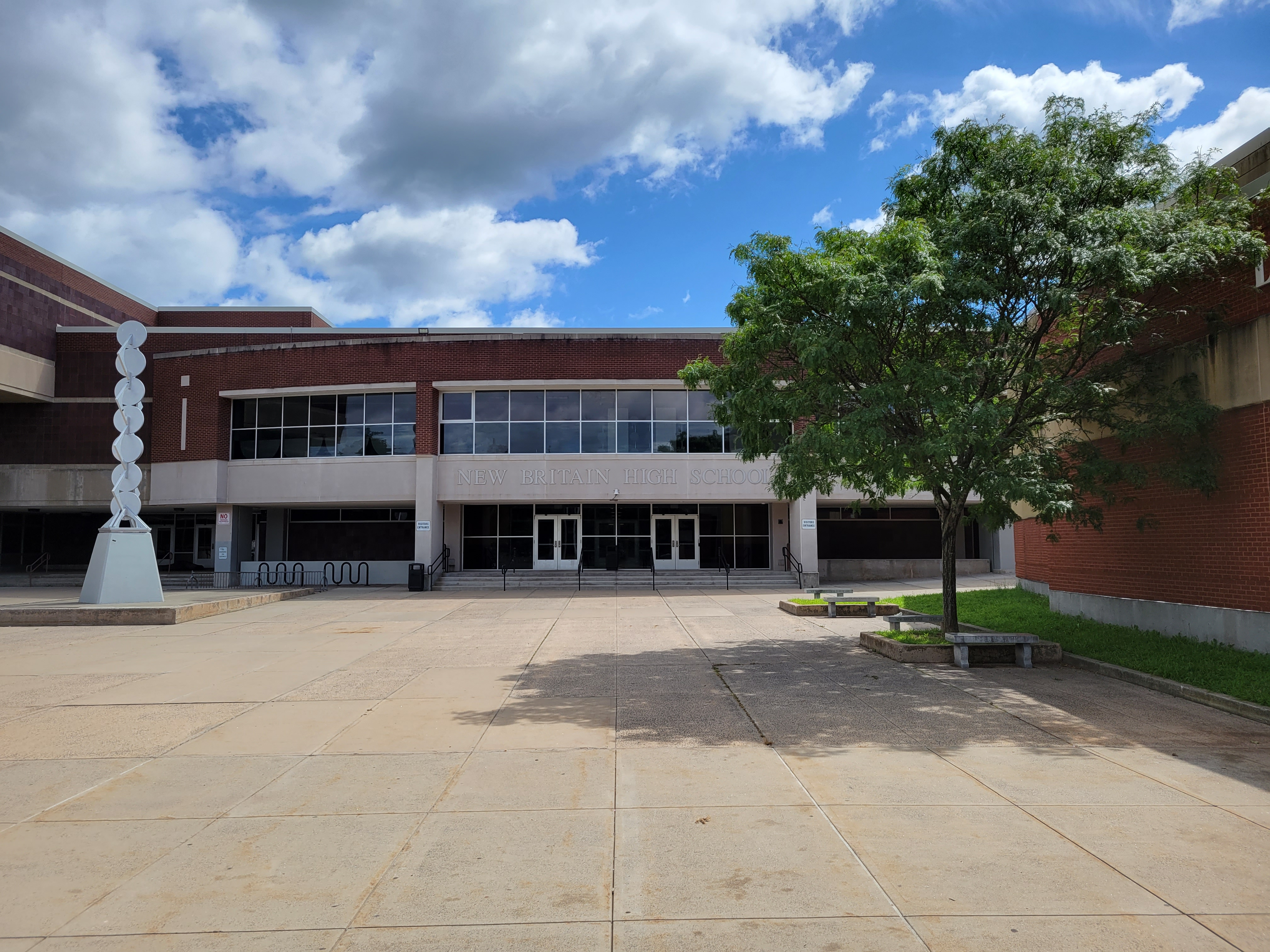

Location
- 110 Mill Street; New Britain, Connecticut 06051; United States; 41°39′03″N 72°46′41″W

Information
- Type: Public school
- Motto: "A world of Opportunity. A Place for Everyone."
- Established: 1850 (176 years ago)
- School district: Consolidated School District of New Britain
- CEEB code: 070455
- Principal: Damon Pearce
- Teaching staff: 153.67 (FTE)
- Grades: 9-12
- Enrollment: 2,398 (2023-2024)
- Student to teacher ratio: 15.60
- Colors: Maroon and Gold
- Team name: Golden Hurricanes
- Website: www.csdnb.org

New Britain High School is a public high school in New Britain, Connecticut, United States, part of the Consolidated School District of New Britain. New Britain High School is one of the largest high schools in the state.

== Athletics ==
Wins in CIAC State Championships
Sport	Class	Year(s)
Baseball	LL	1972, 1974
Basketball (boys)	L	1949, 1950
Basketball (girls)	LL	1998, 2006, 2007
Cheer	Coed	2026
Cross country (boys)	L	1958, 1965, 1967, 1968
Cross country (boys)	LL	1991
Cross country (boys)	Open	1958, 1965, 1991, 1992
Football	LL	1992, 2001, 2003, 2004
Track and field (indoor, boys)	L	1944, 1947, 1958, 1959, 1960, 1967
Track and field (indoor, boys)	Open	1979, 2010
Track and field (outdoor, boys)	L	1958, 1959, 1960, 1961, 1964, 1967, 1975
Track and field (outdoor, boys)	LL	1977, 1979, 2013
Track and field (outdoor, boys)	Open	1959, 1960, 1961, 1977, 1979
Volleyball (girls)	L	1999

== Notable alumni ==
- Anita Antoinette
- Steve Dalkowski
- John Emigh
- Anna Eshoo (1960)
- Richard Godwin
- Harry Jacunski
- Tebucky Jones
- Amrou Fudl
- Abraham Ribicoff
- George Springer
- Erin Stewart
- Tom Thibodeau
- Jonas Zdanys
