= Newtown Public Schools =

Newtown, CT Public School System

Location
- 4 Fairfield Circle South; Newtown (Fairfield County) Connecticut 06470 United States

District information
- Type: Public
- Grades: Pre-kindergarten to 12
- Superintendent: Anne Uberti
- Schools: 9
- Budget: $92,130,000 (2022-2023 school year)
- NCES District ID: 0902910

Students and staff
- Students: 5,298
- Teachers: 380.33 (on an FTE basis)
- Student–teacher ratio: 14.63

Other information
- Website: www.newtown.k12.ct.us

Newtown Public Schools is a school district in Fairfield County, Connecticut, United States. As of 2013 it contained seven schools, with a total enrollment of 5298, an increase of 1663 since 1994. It comprises 2.64% of Fairfield County (0.53% of the state). Teachers in the school district are paid more than average for the area, which has in the past led to complaints from neighboring districts of staff being poached from them.

== History ==
The building that now houses Hawley School was built from donations to Newtown by Mary Elizabeth Hawley in 1921 and was named after her parents. It was a modern building for the time, having central heating, an auditorium, a chemistry laboratory, and fireproofing; however, it lacks modern facilities with respect to other schools in the district, such as central air conditioning. By 1950, the school had become so overcrowded that an extension was built at the rear of the building and some of the old one-room schoolhouses were re-opened. The Newtown High School was located in this building from 1921 to 1953, when it was moved to a new building on Queen Street. The Hawley building was re-used as an elementary school, serving kindergarten to grade 8. The high school moved from Queen Street in 1970, and the Queen Street building became what is today Newtown Middle School, with the Hawley elementary school reduced to serving kindergarten to grade 4.

The playground facilities used by Hawley School were once the Newtown Fairgrounds. They became Taylor Field, owned by Cornelius Byron Taylor, who donated the field to the town at the same time as Hawley donated the building.

On May 10, 2013, a task force voted unanimously to demolish the existing Sandy Hook Elementary School and construct a new school on the existing site.

=== 2012 school shooting ===
On December 14, 2012, Adam Lanza shot and killed his mother at home, then perpetrated a school shooting, in which he killed 20 children and six adults and himself at Sandy Hook Elementary School. It was the fourth-deadliest mass shooting in U.S. history. (Note: The 2017 Las Vegas shooting, the 2016 Orlando nightclub shooting, and the 2007 Virginia Tech shootings were deadlier.) It was also the second-deadliest school shooting in U.S. history, after the Virginia Tech shooting.

Sandy Hook Elementary did not reopen after the shooting; the school's student body moved to the then-closed Chalk Hill Middle School in nearby Monroe on January 3, 2013. Donna Page, the school's former principal, became the interim principal, telling parents it was her "calling" to return after the tragedy. She had been the principal for 14 years before retiring in 2010.

Many residents of Newtown expressed support for turning the site of the shooting at the former Sandy Hook Elementary School building into a memorial.

The town decided the most appropriate course of action would be to tear down the old school and build a new school on the same site. Demolition took place in October and November 2013. The demolition of the school was highly guarded and workers were required to sign confidentiality agreements to protect the victims and their families. The town accepted a state grant of $49.3 million to cover the costs of the demolition and construction. The new school opened on August 29, 2016.

== Schools ==
Schools in the district
School	Type	Location	Grades	Enrollment (year)	Teaching staff (year)	Notes
Newtown High School	High school	Sandy Hook 41.414°N 73.2758°W	9-12	1,679 (2016)	124 (2012)	Won Blue Ribbon school status
Newtown Middle School	Middle school	Newtown	7–8	897 (2012)	70 (2012)	Previously the high school, see #History
Reed Intermediate School	Intermediate school	Newtown	5–6	895 (2012)	55 (2012)	The school is named after John Reed, who was superintendent of schools in the district for 20 years.
Hawley School	Elementary school	Newtown	Kindergarten–4	416 (2012)	26 (2012)	Previously the high school, see #History
Middle Gate School	Elementary school	Newtown 41.3665°N 73.2740°W	Kindergarten–4	480 (2012)	33 (2012)	
Head O'Meadow School	Elementary school	Newtown	Kindergarten–4	369 (2012)	24 (2012)	
Sandy Hook Elementary School	Elementary school	Newtown	Kindergarten–4	337 (2016)	38 (2012)	Site of the December 2012 Sandy Hook Elementary School shooting.: Old Sandy Hook school demolished after shooting; New Sandy Hook school opened on August 29, 2016

== See also ==
- List of school districts in Connecticut
