= Colchester Public Schools =

School district in Connecticut, United States

Address
- 127 Norwich Avenue, Suite 202 Colchester, Connecticut, 06415-1230; United States
- Coordinates: 41.574647°N 72.327901°W

District information
- Grades: PK–12
- Superintendent: Jeffrey E. Burt
- Schools: 4
- NCES District ID: 0900840

Students and staff
- Enrollment: 2,185 (2020-2021)
- Student–teacher ratio: 11.95

Other information
- Website: http://www.colchesterct.org/

Colchester Public Schools, also known as Colchester School District, is a school district in Colchester, Connecticut, United States.

Its boundary is that of the town limits.

== Schools ==
=== High school ===
- Bacon Academy

=== Middle school ===
- William J. Johnston Middle School

=== Intermediate school ===
- Jack Jackter Intermediate School

=== Elementary school ===
- Colchester Elementary School
