= Robbins House =

Robbins House may refer to:

- Unni Robbins II House, Newington, Connecticut, listed on the National Register of Historic Places (NRHP) in Hartford County
- David Robbins Homestead, Milton, Delaware, listed on the NRHP in Sussex County
- Judge George Robbins House, Titusville, Florida, listed on the NRHP in Brevard County
- Samuel W. Robbins House, Cave Spring, Georgia, listed on the NRHP in Floyd County
- Joseph Robbins House, Barnstable, Massachusetts, listed on the NRHP in Barnstable County
- George Robbins House, Carlisle, Massachusetts, listed on the NRHP in Middlesex County
- Hildreth-Robbins House, Chelmsford, Massachusetts, listed on the NRHP in Middlesex County
- Wendell P. and Harriet Rounds Robbins House, Benton Harbor, Michigan, listed on the NRHP in Berrien County
- Robbins House (Jayess, Mississippi), listed on the NRHP in Lawrence County
- Simeon B. Robbins House, Franklinville, New York, listed on the NRHP in Cattaraugus County
- Robbins-Melcher-Schatz Farmstead, Tualatin, Oregon, listed on the NRHP in Clackamas County
- Alice H. Robbins House, Austin, Texas, listed on the NRHP in Travis County
- Robbins House (Concord, Massachusetts)

== See also ==
- John Robbins House (disambiguation)
