= Caesar Robbins =

Veteran of the Revolutionary War, enslaved American

- Born: 1745; Chelmsford, Massachusetts, British America
- Died: 1822 (aged 76–77); Concord, Massachusetts, United States
- Occupations: Soldier, farmer

Caesar Robbins (ca. 1745 – 1822) was a formerly enslaved American farmer and soldier who served in the Continental Army during the American Revolutionary War. His legacy includes the Robbins House, a historic house museum in Concord, Massachusetts. His granddaughter was activist Ellen Garrison Jackson Clark.

== Biography ==
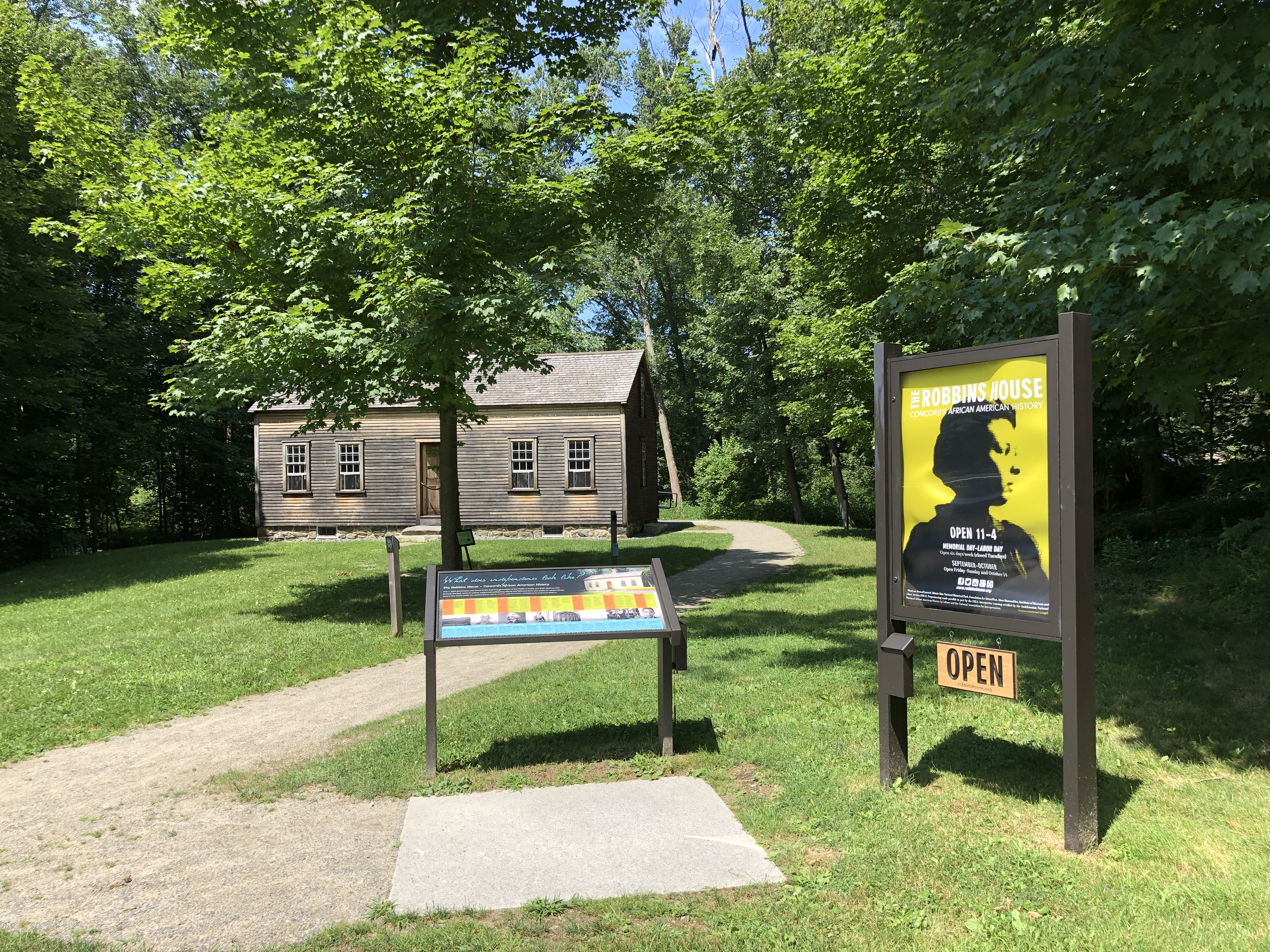
The Robbins House in 2019.

Caesar Robbins was born in about 1745 in Chelmsford, Massachusetts. He was born a slave, but the names of his parents and slave owner remain unknown. At 16 years old, Robbins enlisted in the French and Indian War, with his owner collecting his wages. He later enlisted in the American Revolutionary War in his early 30s, gaining his emancipation either at or before this time. He may have participated in the Battles of Lexington and Concord on April 19, 1775. In 1776, he served under Captain Israel Heald in Boston and marched to Fort Ticonderoga in upstate New York in August of that year. There is also evidence Caesar was involved in battles in Bennington, Vermont. He finished his duties c. 1779, before he finally moved back to Concord, Massachusetts, as a war veteran.

In 1784, Robbins was 40 and living in Carlisle, Massachusetts, with his family. By 1790 he had settled on a plot of farmland in Concord in the area of Great Field. A white farmer named Humphrey Barrett owned the property but permitted Robbins to reside on it. Robbins may have married an enslaved woman named Phyllis in 1769. He married Catherine Boaz in 1777, and they remained married until her death. He subsequently married a Concord woman named Rose Bay in 1807. He had a total of six children. He died in 1822 at the approximate age of 77.

Great Field was the site of settlement for many recently emancipated African Americans during this period. Concord, at the time, had what was considered a large black population, although the population in question was only near three percent.

== Descendants ==
In 1823, Caesar Robbins' son, Peter, purchased a small farmhouse at the edge of the Concord River with 13 surrounding acres, a property that would become known as the Robbins House. From the 1820s until 1837, Peter resided in the home, sharing it with his wife Fatima, his sister and Caesar's daughter Susan, and Susan's husband Jack Garrison. Later they also shared the home with Susan and Jack's children. However, it was said that some of the children had died at a young age. Eventually, the farmhouse was sold to Fatima's relative, Peter, in 1852, whose family would be the last to live at the Robbins House.

Caesar's daughter, Susan Robbins, later known as Susan Garrison, became a critical part of Concord's feminist and anti-slavery movement. She was a founding member, as well as the only known Black member, of the Concord Female Anti-Slavery Society (CFAS), founded in 1837. The Robbins House hosted many of the first CFAS meetings, where the committee "signed petitions against slavery, the slave trade, the annexation of Texas, and the removal of the Cherokees from their homeland in the southeastern United States. [Susan also] likely helped found the First African Baptist Church in Boston." She died in 1841 at about 61 years of age, but her four children carried on the work of the anti-slavery movement. Even Henry David Thoreau, a Massachusetts-bound historical icon, was deeply influenced by the Robbins family and included aspects of their anti-slavery work in his writings.

Robbins' granddaughter Ellen Garrison Jackson Clark, a pioneering civil rights activist, was born in the Robbins House.

== The Robbins House ==
The Robbins House still stands as a historic landmark in Concord. Mass Humanities, an organization based in Massachusetts, is working with the town of Concord to uphold Caesar Robbins' history and preserve the Robbins' house. The organization takes donations for the house and volunteers to maintain it and keep an eye on the property. Concord also offers a Guided African American History Tour, where five percent of the proceeds are donated to the Robbins House. Locations of historical significance such as Caesar's Wood, Peter's Field, Brister Hill, and Walden Woods are all near the Robbins House.
