= John Robins =

John Robins may refer to:

- John Robins (born c. 1511), MP for Dover
- John Robins (prophet) (fl. 1650–52), English Ranter and plebeian prophet
- John Robins (c. 1714 – 1754), MP for Stafford
- John Robins (rugby union) (1926–2007), Welsh rugby union international
- John Robins (comedian) (born 1982), English stand-up comedian
- John Robins (writer), (1884–1952), Canadian academic and humorist

== See also ==
- John Robbins (disambiguation)
