= John Robbins House =

John Robbins House may refer to:

- John Robbins House (Rocky Hill, Connecticut), listed on the National Register of Historic Places in Hartford County, Connecticut
- John Robbins House (Acton, Massachusetts), listed on the National Register of Historic Places in Middlesex County, Massachusetts

== See also ==
- Robbins House (disambiguation)
