= Academy Hall =

Academy Hall may refer to:

- Academy Hall (Rocky Hill, Connecticut), listed on the National Register of Historic Places in Hartford County, Connecticut
- Academy Hall (Edinboro University of Pennsylvania), oldest building at Edinboro University of Pennsylvania and listed on the National Register of Historic Places
- Academy Hall (North Yarmouth Academy), listed on the National Register of Historic Places in Yarmouth, Maine
- Academy Hall, a building at Rensselaer Polytechnic Institute
