= Stevens Elementary School =

Stevens Elementary School may refer to:

Schools with their own articles:

- Thaddeus Stevens School - Washington, DC - District of Columbia Public Schools
- Thaddeus Stevens Elementary School - Pittsburgh, Pennsylvania - Pittsburgh School District

Schools covered in school district articles or daughter list articles:

- Stevens Elementary School - Wheatridge, Colorado - Jeffco Public Schools
- Myrtle H. Stevens Elementary School - Rocky Hill, Connecticut - Rocky Hill School District
- Frances L. Stevens Elementary School - Ballston Lake, New York - Burnt Hills-Ballston Lake Central School District
- Lulu Stevens Elementary School - Houston, Texas - Houston Independent School District
- Mary Katherine Stephens Elementary School - Rowlett, Texas - Garland Independent School District
- Stevens Elementary School - Seattle, Washington - Seattle Public Schools
- Stevens Elementary School - Spokane, Washington - Spokane Public Schools
