= Rocky Hill Center Historic District =

Historic district in Connecticut, United States

- U.S. National Register of Historic Places
- U.S. Historic district
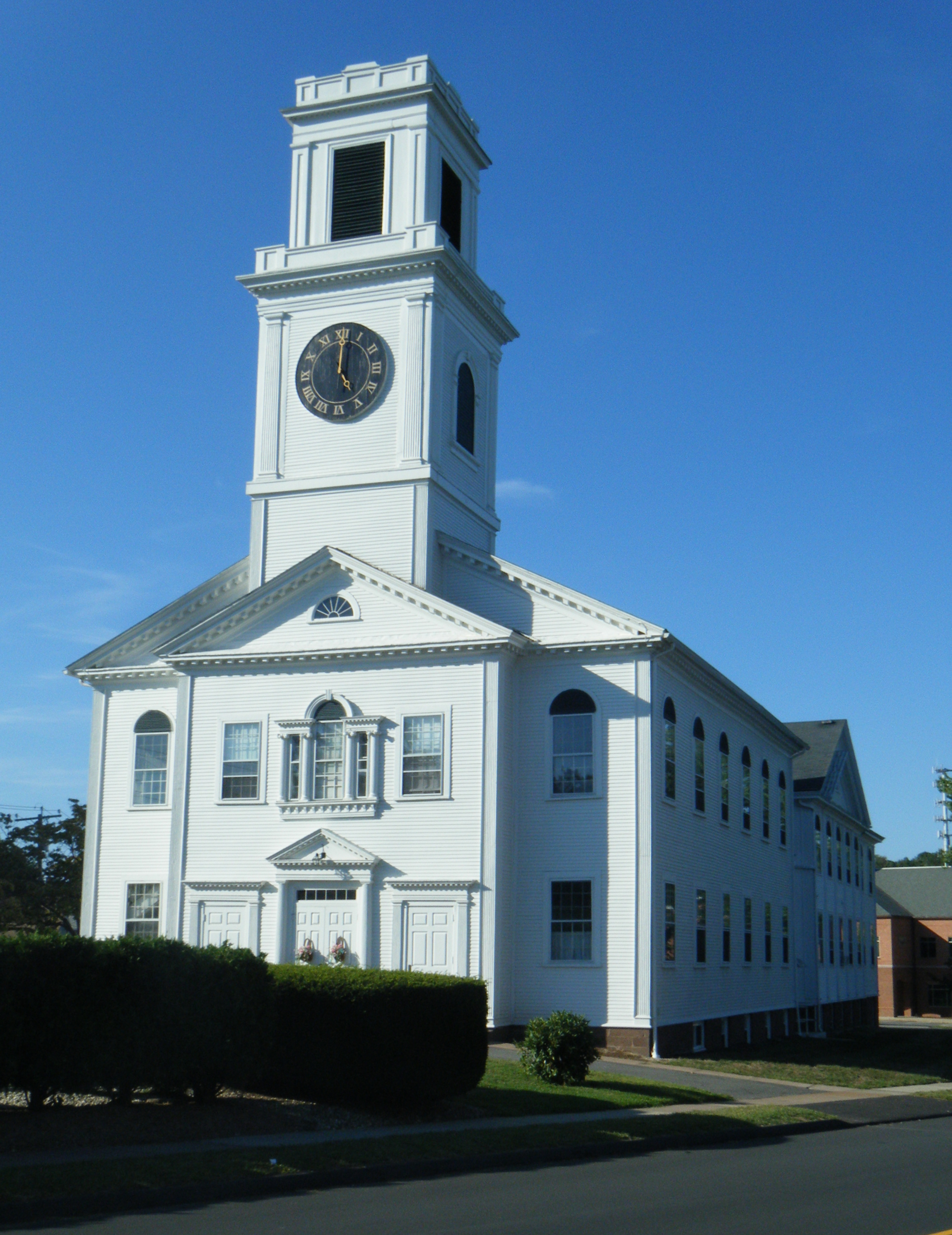
- Rocky Hill Congregational Church

- Location within Connecticut Location within the United States
- Location: Roughly bounded by Old Main, Pratt & Washington Streets, Glastonbury Avenue, and Riverview Road, Rocky Hill, Connecticut
- Area: 112 acres (45 ha)
- Architectural style: Colonial, Federal
- NRHP reference No.: 07000111
- Added to NRHP: March 9, 2007

The Rocky Hill Center Historic District encompasses the traditional town center and surrounding residential area of Rocky Hill, Connecticut. It extends along Old Main Street from the Wethersfield line southward to a triangular area bounded by Old Main, Riverview Road, and Glastonbury Avenue. Included in a basically 19th-century streetscape are the town's principal civic and religious buildings, as well as a fine collection of mainly 18th and 19th-century residential architecture. The district was listed on the National Register of Historic Places in 2007.

== Description and history ==
The area that is now Rocky Hill was settled in the 17th century as part of Wethersfield, and was established as a separate parish within that town in 1723. It was separately incorporated in 1843. Economically, it grew as a result of a major flood of the Connecticut River in 1700, which altered the river's course and left Rocky Hill as Wethersfield's major port. It benefited from international trade, but was politically dominated by its major landowners. The first church was built near the southern end of Old Main Street in 1727. With its location west of the port (now the site of the Rocky Hill–Glastonbury ferry) and a line of traprock hills, it became the nucleus of the town center, with the main residential district extending northward. The area's maritime importance declined in the first half of the 19th century, caused by improvements in maritime technology and the dredging of sandbars upstream in the river. The town remained largely agrarian until the 20th century, when it developed its present suburban character.

Most of the historic district's 232 historically significant buildings are residences. Many of them were built before 1850, and include fine examples of Georgian and Federal architecture. The oldest building in the district is the c. 1710 Captain David Riley House, a two-story three-bay Georgian structure. Important surviving early civic buildings include the Academy Hall, an 1803 schoolhouse that now serves as a local history museum, and the 1808 Rocky Hill Congregational Church, a highly visible landmark within the center. Later civic buildings include the public library (1967) and town hall (2000), the latter partly including an older (1916) wood-frame structure. The only brick house in the district is the 18th-century John Robbins House.

== See also ==
- National Register of Historic Places listings in Hartford County, Connecticut
