= Ellen Garrison Jackson Clark =

American civil rights activist (1823–1892)

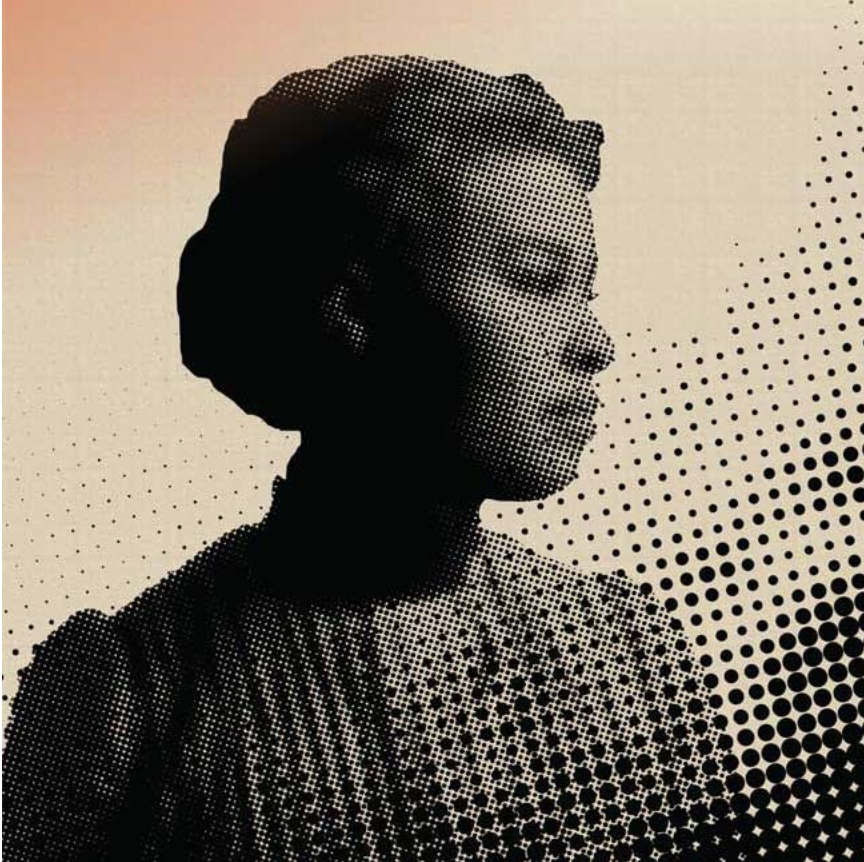
- Representational image of Garrison
- Born: April 14, 1823; Concord, Massachusetts
- Died: December 21, 1892 (aged 69)
- Burial place: Mountain View Cemetery, Altadena
- Occupation: Educator
- Known for: African American abolitionist and civil rights activist

Ellen Garrison Jackson Clark (April 14, 1823 – December 21, 1892) was an African American educator, abolitionist, and early Civil Rights activist, whose defiance of "whites only" social spaces has been compared to Rosa Parks' actions in the 20th century. After decades spent crisscrossing the East Coast, the South, and the Midwest in the service of teaching literacy, Clark spent her final two years settled in Pasadena, California for health reasons. She was buried in an unmarked grave in Altadena. In 2021, the Altadena Historical Society successfully lobbied to provide Clark's grave with a memorial headstone.

== Early life ==
Clark was born to Jack Garrison and Susan Robbins in Concord, Massachusetts. Her grandfather, Caesar Robbins, was a formerly enslaved free man and veteran of the Revolutionary War. Jack Garrison had lived the life of a free man after emancipating himself from enslavement in New Jersey.

The home Clark grew up in has been repurposed in recent years: the 544 square foot building, built around the time Clark was born, is now an African American history museum, called The Robbins House. The museum explores the lives of Concord’s first generations of African Americans, and uses their stories to contextualize African American history in general.

At the time of Clark's birth in 1823, Concord was open to previously enslaved people (Massachusetts abolished slavery in 1783) and was well known for being an abolitionist's stronghold. Her mother Susan was a founding member of The Concord Female Anti-Slavery Society and its only known Black member. In 1857, Clark married John W. Jackson, a free Black gardener from Delaware, but in 1863, she listed herself as a widow when she applied to become a Freedmen's school teacher.

Throughout her life, Clark signed petitions, including the demand for equal rights for Native Americans and desegregation of Massachusetts trains and Boston schools.

== Civil War and Reconstruction ==
After her inspiring and challenging youth in Concord, Massachusetts, Ellen moved to Boston, where she became a teacher and joined the city’s social justice community. She helped organize events and assisted with fundraisers for abolitionist and equal rights causes.

During the Civil War, Clark taught at a private school in Newport, Rhode Island. There were many opportunities to teach freed African Americans of all ages. This path led her to a long association with the American Missionary Association (AMA), an abolitionist Protestant group dedicated to the abolition of slavery, education, and racial equality. In her application to the AMA to become a Freedmen's school teacher, she wrote,

"I think it is our duty as a people to spend our lives in trying to elevate our own race."

Utilizing her passport as proof of her freedom and full citizenship and a free person, Clark taught in Freedmen's schools in Port Deposit, Maryland and Virginia, often facing hostile racism. For example, in a letter, she describes an encounter with a man who first stepped on her dress, and then verbally harassed and attacked her physically. Reflecting on moments like these, Clark responded with a message of power and perseverance:

“I have found out one thing about these people. If they attack you be careful to stand your ground and they will leave you, but if you run they will follow.”

In 1870, due to funding issues, the AMA discontinued their contract with Clark, but she soon found more teaching opportunities in North Carolina with a Quaker organization.

== Baltimore 1866: standing up for Civil Rights ==
On May 5th, 1866, during her tenure as a schoolteacher in Port Deposit, Clark and her colleague Mary J. C. Anderson were forcibly ejected from a ladies-only waiting room. They refused requests to leave in accordance with the Civil Rights Act of 1866, which granted African American citizens the same rights as white citizens. At the time of this event and the subsequent legal action, the Civil Rights Act had yet to be ratified – it had been vetoed by President Andrew Johnson, but the veto was subsequently overridden by Congress.

After the event, Clark wrote in a letter, "We were thrown out. We were injured in our persons as well as our feelings for it was with no gentle hand that we were assisted from that room and I feel the effects of it still".

Intending to test train depot segregation in light of the 1866 Civil Rights act, Jackson and Anderson brought suit against the station master, an employee of the Philadelphia, Baltimore, and Wilmington Railroad, who had thrown them out of the waiting room. Initially, the court case was assigned to a judge who was sympathetic to civil rights, but the station master requested a jury. The case was subsequently not mentioned again in the local media, and it is possible that Jackson and Anderson declined a jury trial, as an all-white jury would have been unlikely to convict.

Nevertheless, the case is a significant event in the history of Civil Rights activism, with many sources pointing out its resonance with Rosa Parks’ actions and legal case..

== Later life ==
In the 1880s, Ellen joined a migration movement of Black "Exodusters", thousands of newly-freed people of color who the government encouraged to homestead in Kansas and elsewhere in the Midwest. These towns were often granted new schools and other basic amenities. In Kansas, Ellen met and married her second husband, widower Harvey Clark, and became a stepmother to four of his children.

Clark contracted tuberculosis, then called “consumption,” and moved westward with her husband and two of his sons, eventually settling in Pasadena, California. Her older sister Susan, living in Oakland, California at the time, came to live with her there. Clark died from her illness on December 21, 1892. She was buried in Altadena's Mountain View Cemetery in a registered but unmarked grave. Other people who were buried in the same cemetery with her include notable African American science fiction author, Octavia Butler and Black Panther activist, Eldridge Cleaver.

On Juneteenth, 2021, Clark received a headstone through a campaign by the Altadena Historical Society.
