= Robbins House (Concord, Massachusetts) =

Black history museum, Concord, MA

Coordinates: 42°28′13″N 71°20′54″W

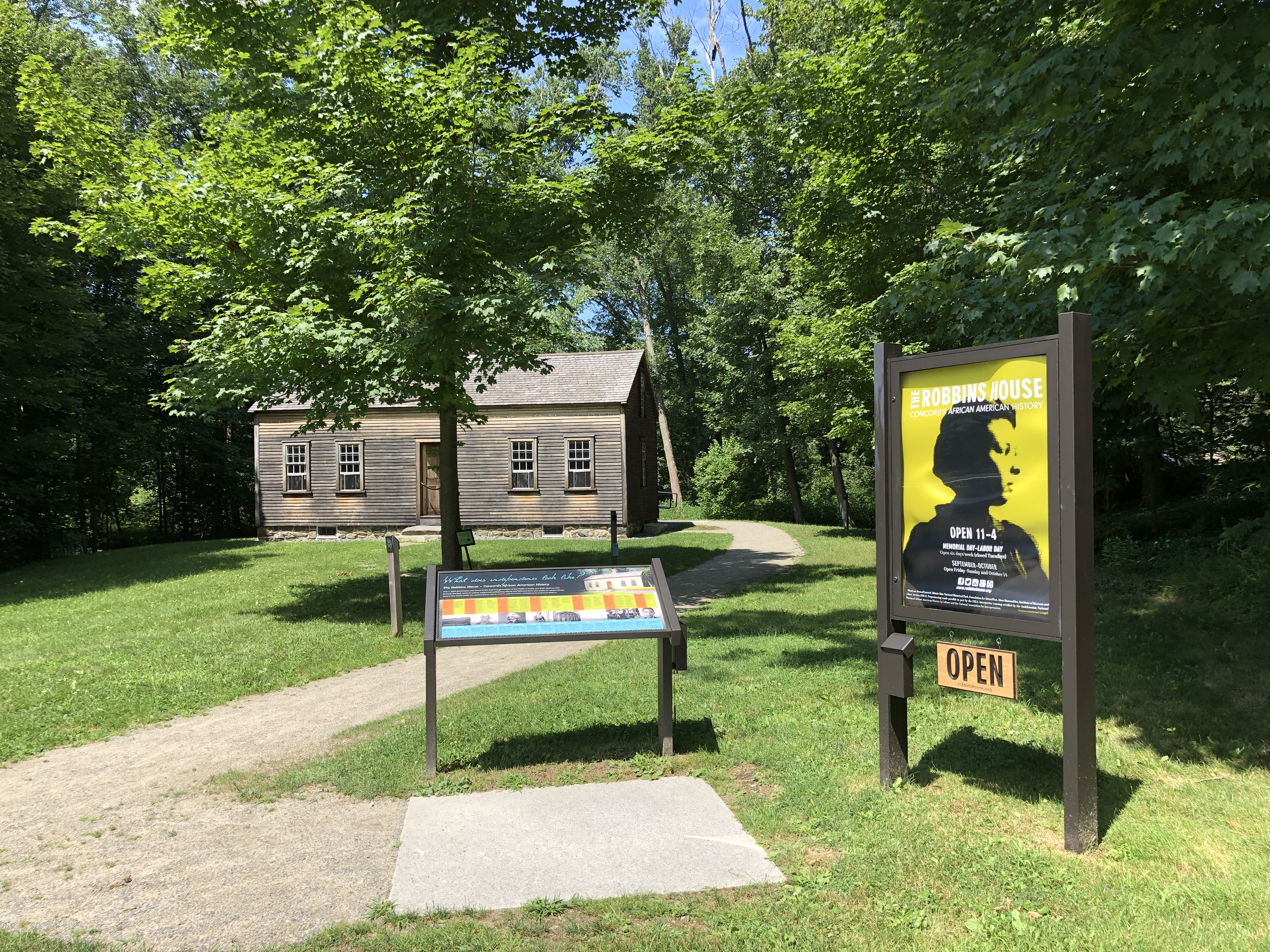
View of the Robbins House

The Robbins House is a historic house museum at 320 Monument Street in Concord, Massachusetts, which focuses on interpreting the early African American history of Concord and the Northeastern United States.

The Robbins House was built in the early 1820s as a two-room, two-family farmhouse for two grown children of Revolutionary War veteran Caesar Robbins and their families. Originally located in an isolated field on the outskirts of town, it was the childhood home of Caesar Robbins' granddaughter Ellen Garrison Jackson Clark, one of the first people to legally test the 1866 Civil Rights Act.

In 2010, the house was saved from demolition. It was relocated to its present location and restored, and it opened as a museum in 2011.

== History ==
The house was first owned by Peter Robbins. His father, formerly enslaved Revolutionary War veteran Caesar Robbins, lived in the area; 1784 records show that Caesar, age 40, was the head of a household in neighboring Carlisle. By 1790, he was farming and living on a small plot of land in Concord owned by Humphrey Barrett. He died in 1822. The following year, Peter Robbins (1792–1855) purchased newly built Robbins House farmhouse and over 13 acres (5.3 ha) for $260 from Barrett. The households of Caesar's children Peter and Susan became the first residents of the Robbins House.

Peter and his wife, Fatima Oliver, resided in the west side of the house. At the same time, Peter's sister, Susan Garrison, her husband Jack Garrison, and their children occupied the east side. Peter Hutchinson, Fatima's relative, bought the house in 1852. He and his large family were the last to live in this house on the farm.

In 1870–71, the house was purchased by an Irish immigrant family and moved to a nearby road. After ownership by several subsequent proprietors it was proposed for demolition in 2007. Due to its history as the home of early African Americans, it was saved, moved across from the North Bridge, and restored to tell Concord's early Black history.

=== Early inhabitants ===
==== Peter Robbins ====
Described as "the big burly son of Caesar Robbins," Peter worked as a farmer and seasonal laborer, selling timber from the trees on his land and the rye and cranberries he grew. In 1824, Peter Robbins married Fatima Oliver; they lived at the Robbins House together until 1831. Robbins then moved with Oliver's niece Almira Davis to a nearby farm, where they had 13 children. Deeply in debt from mortgaging two farms, by 1835 Peter lost all his property to his creditors, but he soon leased it back, becoming a tenant farmer. Peter Robbins and Fatima Oliver divorced in 1837 and she stayed on in the Robbins House, while Peter retained the rights to all the rye growing on the farm.

==== Susan Garrison ====
Susan Garrison (c.1780–1841) was a charter member of the Concord Female Antislavery Society (CFAS). In 1837, she hosted the second CFAS meeting in her home. Garrison is the only woman of color listed in existing CFAS records. Susan and her husband Jack lived in the east side of the house from 1823 to 1837 with four of their surviving children, while Susan Garrison's brother Peter Robbins and his family occupied the west side of the house. As the daughter and wife of previously enslaved men, Susan signed petitions against slavery, the slave trade, the annexation of Texas, and the removal of the Cherokees from their homeland in the southeastern United States. She likely helped found the First African Baptist Church in Boston. Susan passed this legacy of activism on to her children.

Susan Garrison and Jack's daughter, Ellen Garrison Jackson Clark (April 14, 1823 – December 21, 1892), an African American educator, abolitionist, and early Civil Rights activist, grew up in the Robbins House.

==== Jack Garrison ====
By 1810, John "Jack" Garrison (c.1768–1860) had fled his enslaved life in New Jersey for freedom in Concord. Here he found work as a woodcutter and day laborer for Concord residents. In 1812 he married Caesar Robbins' daughter. Under the threat of both the 1793 and 1850 federal fugitive slave laws, Jack was vulnerable to capture for the rest of his life.

In February 1804, New Jersey passed a law providing for the "gradual emancipation of slaves" and became the last Northern state to begin the process of ending slavery within its borders. People held in bondage who had been born before these laws were passed remained enslaved until 1846 when they were considered indentured servants who were "apprenticed for life". This no doubt motivated Jack Garrison to escape, finally finding freedom in Concord, MA.

Slavery denied Jack an education; he signed his name with an "X" throughout his life, but his surviving children went to Concord schools and were "literate and good students." In his later years, Jack lived on and off at Concord's poor farm until his son John could afford to remove him. Well into his 60s, Jack walked about town "with his saw-horse over his shoulder and his saw on his arm." He lived to be about 92 years old. As the oldest person in town, Jack received a walking stick from the Town of Concord, and the Concord Female Antislavery Society printed his image on a calling card used to raise awareness of the antislavery movement. Jack's and his son John's photos are the only known images of early Concord African Americans1; early symbols of the fight for freedom.

==== Peter Hutchinson ====
Peter Hutchinson (1799 to 1882, 82 years) was born in nearby Acton or Carlisle. He married Nancy Dager, a woman of Welsh descent, at the First African Baptist Church in Boston, with whom he had six children. Peter and his large family were the last African Americans to own the Robbins House, and they lived there from 1852 to 1867–68.

Described by another farmer as "the ablest common laborer I have ever known," Hutchinson constructed buildings, slaughtered livestock, and sold pigs to other farmers. He won first prize in the plowing contest at the 1835 Middlesex agricultural fair. Peter signed petitions opposing railroad discrimination and the 1850 Fugitive Slave Law. Peter "had more local knowledge of wood lots and meadow bounds than any man in town," according to J.S. Keyes. During his time in the Robbins House, the farm lane became known as Peter's Path, a spring was known as Peter's Spring, and the woods nearby were called Peter's Woods. Fifty years after his death, a local firewood business was named the Peter Hutchinson Company in his honor.

Emerson's poems "Peter's Field" and "Dirge" were set on the farm overlooking the Great Meadows during the years Peter Hutchinson owned it. Thoreau expressed respect for Peter's knowledge of Concord's woods, fields, and wildlife in his journals.

In 2013, The Robbins House and the Friends of Sleepy Hollow provided a marker for Peter Hutchinson and his family at Sleepy Hollow Cemetery.

==== Fatima Robbins ====
Fatima Oliver (Caesar Robbins' Daughter-in-law, 1786–1873) was part of a large, mixed-race family, including Peter Hutchinson, whose members lived in nearby communities. Fatima married Peter Robbins in 1824, but by 1831 Peter had moved to a nearby farm, where he eventually fathered 13 children with Fatima's niece. Fatima filed for divorce in 1837 when a law passed that made adultery no longer an offense punishable by imprisonment.

Fatima's divorce was granted, and in her settlement, she retained the rights to the west side of the Robbins House and one-third of the Robbins farm. After her divorce, Fatima sold her rights to the property and moved out of the Robbins House.

Fatima remained in Concord for the rest of her life, working at times as a domestic servant and boarding in rooms where she received some support from the Concord Overseers of the Poor.
