= Helen Thoreau =

American teacher and abolitionist (1812–1849)

Helen Louisa Thoreau
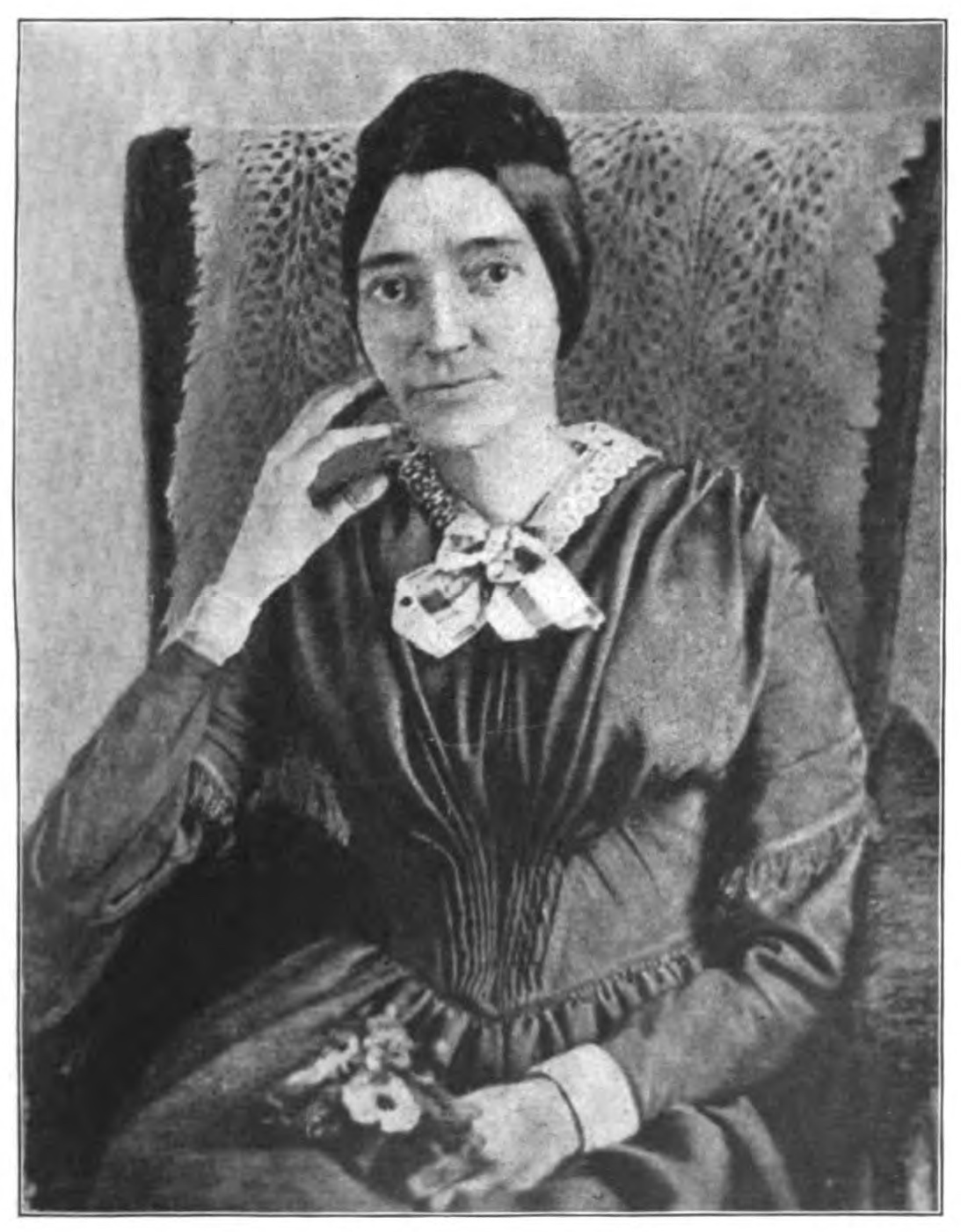
- Born: October 22, 1812; Concord, Massachusetts, US
- Died: June 14, 1849 (aged 36); Concord, Massachusetts, US
- Occupations: Teacher, abolitionist
- Organization: The Concord Female Anti-Slavery Society
- Relatives: Henry David Thoreau (brother)

Helen Louisa Thoreau (22 October 1812 – 14 June 1849) was an American teacher and abolitionist. Prominent in New England's anti-slavery circles, she was eulogized by William Lloyd Garrison after her death.

== Early life ==
Helen Louisa Thoreau was born on October 22, 1812, to John and Cynthia Dunbar Thoreau, five months after their marriage. She attended Concord Academy, studying English, Latin, painting, and piano. Her art was recognised at the Middlesex County Agricultural Fair.

She began teaching in 1829, and put some of her earnings towards her brother Henry’s Harvard tuition.

== Abolitionism ==
Helen was involved in abolitionism throughout the 1830s and 1840s. She acted as secretary of the Middlesex County Anti-Slavery Society, vice president of the Concord Female Anti-Slavery Society, and signed numerous abolitionist petitions.

Helen cultivated friendships with prominent abolitionists of the period, including Frederick Douglass and William Lloyd Garrison. In 1842, dismayed by the churches' failure to stand against slavery and conservative ministers' castigation of women's abolitionism, she stopped attending services.

In 1844, Helen, Sophia, and Cynthia Thoreau attended the New England Anti-Slavery convention in Boston. The same year, Helen probably secured Frederick Douglass to speak at a Concord anti-slavery meeting.

The following year, she worked to resolve a controversy concerning a lecture to be given by radical abolitionist Wendell Phillips at the Concord Lyceum. After two leading figures there sought to prevent Phillips from speaking, Helen and other leading Concord figures demanded a vote. The vote resulted in Phillips being allowed to speak, with Helen writing that it was "a hard battle—but victory at last".

Helen Thoreau was described by a colleague in the anti-slavery movement as "endowed by nature with tender sensibilities" and "quick to feel for the woe of others".

== Death and legacy ==
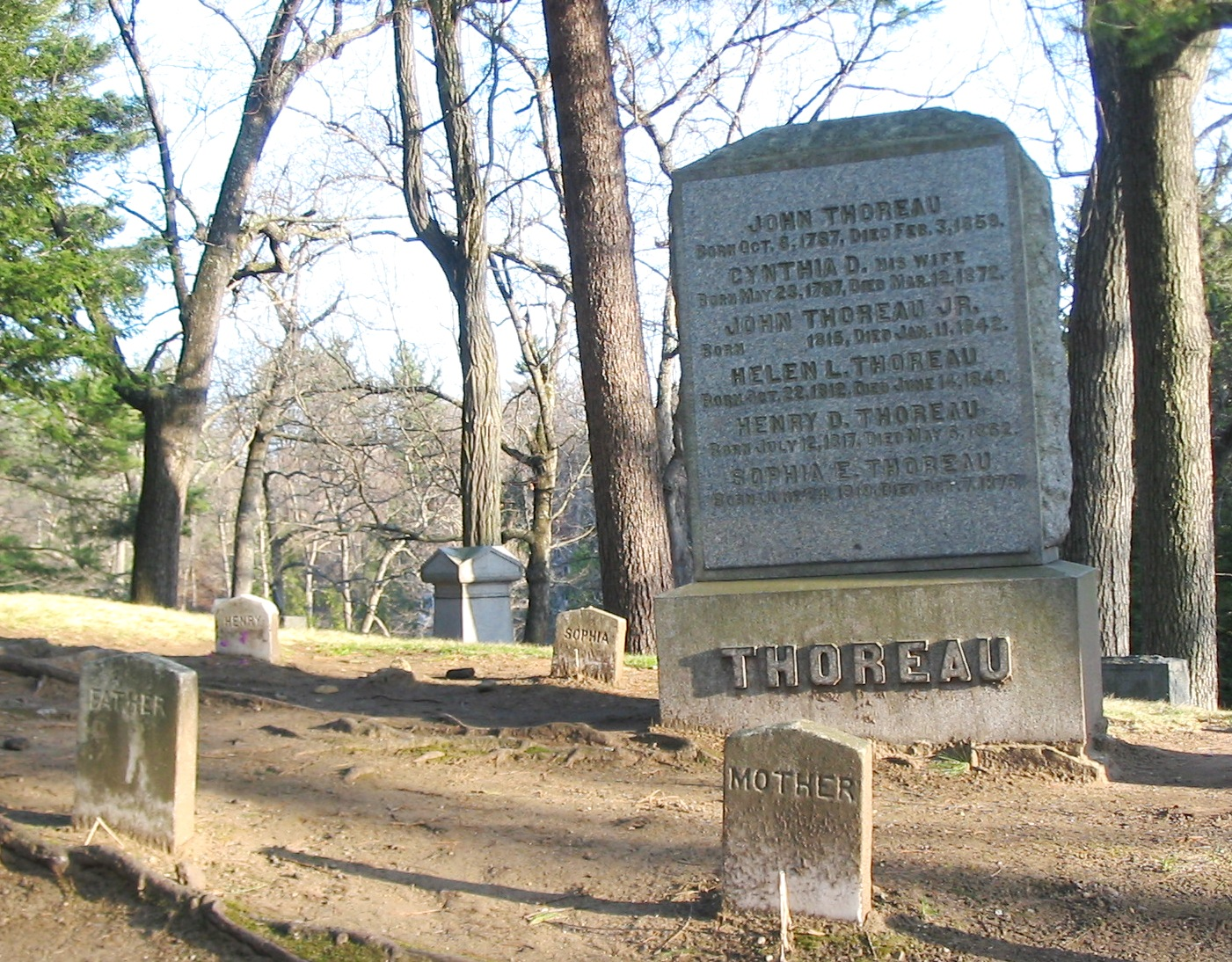
Thoreau family gravesite in Sleepy Hollow Cemetery (Concord, Massachusetts)

Helen Thoreau died from tuberculosis in Concord on June 14, 1849. She was eulogized by William Lloyd Garrison in The Liberator newspaper, where he wrote:

She had the patience to investigate truth, the candor to acknowledge it when sufficient evidence was presented to her mind, and the moral courage to act in conformity with her convictions, however unpopular these convictions might be to the community around her.

Along with her mother and sister, Helen Thoreau has been acknowledged as a significant abolitionist and a key influence on galvanising her brother Henry's involvement in anti-slavery efforts. In a 2001 paper, Sandra Petrulionis wrote that:

In Concord, a mecca of transcendentalism, abolitionism was predominantly women's work. For decades, Concord women sponsored speakers, disseminated periodicals and other propaganda, circulated and signed petitions, raised money, [and] traveled to national conventions... [I]t was largely through these outspoken women sharing their homes that Concord's famous men came to accept leading roles in the fight against slavery.
