= John Robbins =

John Robbins may refer to:

- John Robbins (author) (1947–2025), American author, known for his books on vegetarianism, food, and health
- John Robbins (congressman) (1808–1880), American congressman from Pennsylvania
- John Robbins (illustrator) (1938–2016), host of the public television program Cover to Cover
- John B. Robbins (1932–2019), American medical researcher known for the development of the vaccine against bacterial meningitis
- John Everett Robbins (1903–1995), Canadian educator, encyclopedia editor and diplomat
- Jack Robbins (1916–1983), American football player
- Jack Robbins, fictional character on EastEnders television series
- Jack W. Robbins (1919–2005), American prosecutor at Nuremberg trials
- John Robins (comedian) (born 1982), British comedian

== See also ==
- John Franklyn-Robbins, British actor
- John Robbins House (disambiguation), multiple locations
