= Rocky Hill High School =

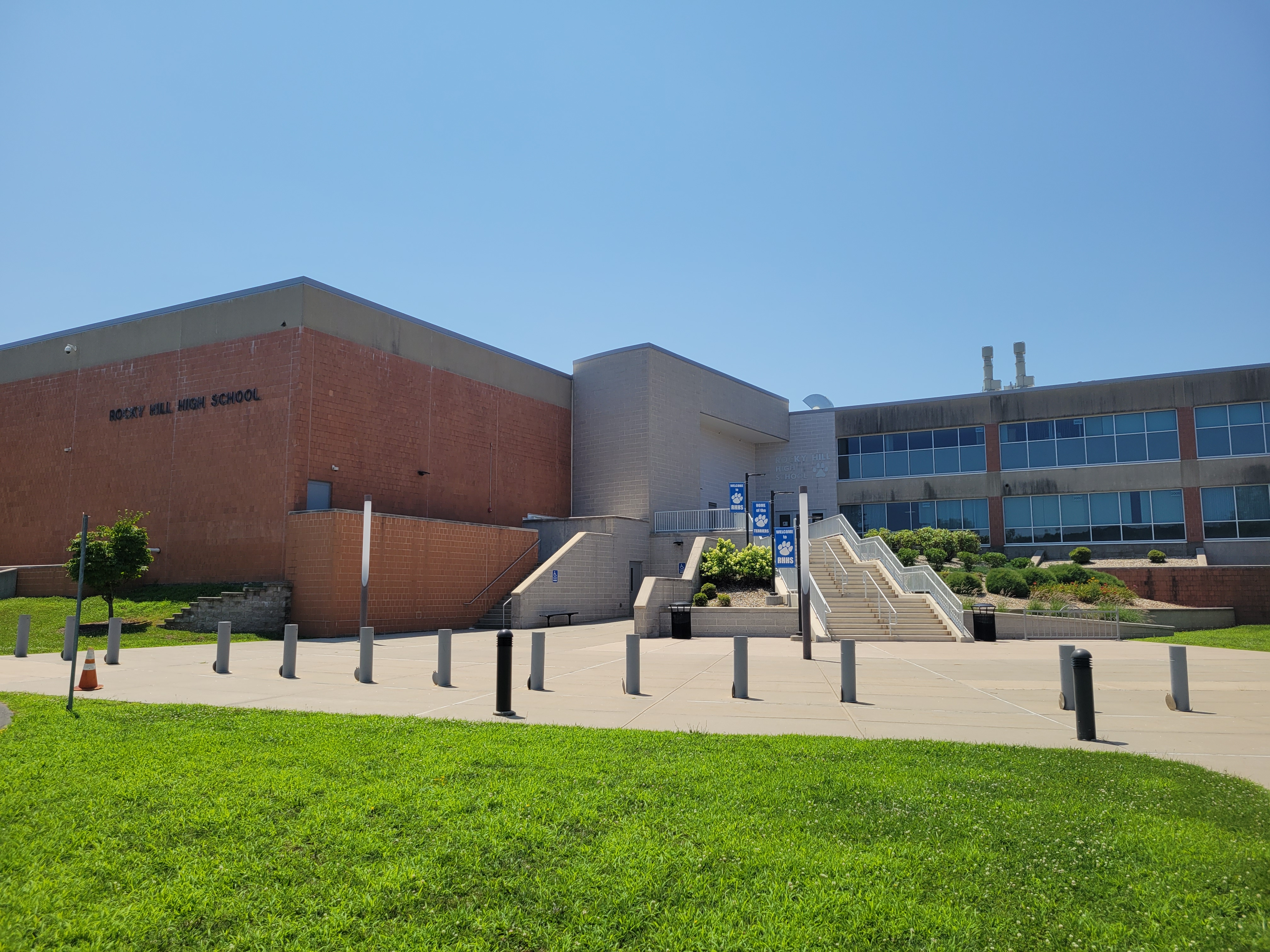

Location
- 50 Chapin Avenue; Rocky Hill, Hartford County, Connecticut 06067; United States
- Coordinates: 41°40′12″N 72°38′50″W

Information
- School type: Public school
- Opened: 1981 (45 years ago)
- School district: Rocky Hill Public Schools
- Superintendent: Mark F. Zito, Ed.D.
- CEEB code: 070648
- Principal: John Fote (2021-Present)
- Teaching staff: 64.80 (FTE)
- Grades: 9-12
- Enrollment: 738 (2024-2025)
- Student to teacher ratio: 11.39
- Colors: Blue, White and Red
- Athletics conference: Northwest Conference (Nutmeg-Football) until 2009. After 2009, Central Connecticut Conference East (CCC).
- Mascot: Terrier
- Team name: Terriers
- Newspaper: The Broadside
- Website: rockyhillhighrockyhillct.schoolinsites.com

Rocky Hill High School is a four year high school in Rocky Hill, Connecticut.

== Overview ==
The school was constructed in 1980, and has a rated capacity of 750.

The school underwent a $50 million, 3-year renovation from 2014-2017, which expanded the backside of the school and added air conditioning throughout the building.

== Curriculum ==
Rocky Hill High School is accredited by the Connecticut State Department of Education and the New England Association of Schools and Colleges. Several "Early College Experience" classes are offered at RHHS in collaboration with the University of Connecticut.

As of May 2009, Rocky Hill High School was coordinating with the Virtual High School program, to help provide students with extra opportunity to take classes on line. These classes are ones generally not offered to students at RHHS, and will count towards minimum required number of credits (22) needed to graduate from Rocky Hill High School.

== Accreditation ==
In 2011 the New England Association of Schools and Colleges voted to continue Rocky Hill High School's existing accreditation, but put the school on warning due to concerns about the curriculum and facilities. The school's leadership noted that a $39 million upgrade, which would have addressed most of these issues, had been part of a school funding referendum rejected by the voters in June 2010. In January 2012, the outgoing school superintendent warned that the school "will be placed on probation and will lose accreditation if no action is taken."

== Athletics ==
Rocky Hill High School has various sports and other extracurricular activities which include soccer, football, baseball, softball, volleyball, swimming and diving, wrestling, tennis, indoor/outdoor track, cross country running, etc. The baseball team won the state championship in 2014. The football team made it to the finals of the state championship in 2016 but was defeated to Ansonia.

The Rocky Hill High School Royal Blues Marching Band performs a themed show every year and competes in the New England State Championships hosted by USBands. They also play at school sports games, local parades, and other events. The Royal Blues Marching Band won the New England State Championship Group I A in 2016 and 2017, as well as Group II Open in 2019. The marching band was also a creative class finalist in the 2020 National Championships.

== Recognition ==
Notable administrators at the district received awards for their work in the education system.

- In 2005, then Principal Robert Pitocco was selected as Connecticut State Principal of the Year.
- In 2006, then Assistant Principal Donna Hayward was selected as Connecticut State Assistant Principal of the Year.
