= Rocky Hill Public Schools =

School district in Connecticut, United States

Address
- 761 Old Main Street Suite 231 Rocky Hill, Connecticut 06067 United States

District information
- Type: Public
- Grades: Pre K-12
- Superintendent: Mark F. Zito

Other information
- Teachers' unions: AFT Connecticut; Connecticut Education Association

Rocky Hill Public Schools or Rocky Hill School District is a school district headquartered in Rocky Hill, Connecticut, United States.

== Schools ==
=== High school ===
- Rocky Hill High School

=== Middle school ===
- Griswold Middle School

=== Elementary schools ===
- Moser School
- Stevens Elementary School
- West Hill Elementary School
