= Rocky Hill Congregational Church =

Historic church in Connecticut, United States

- U.S. National Register of Historic Places
- U.S. Historic district – Contributing property
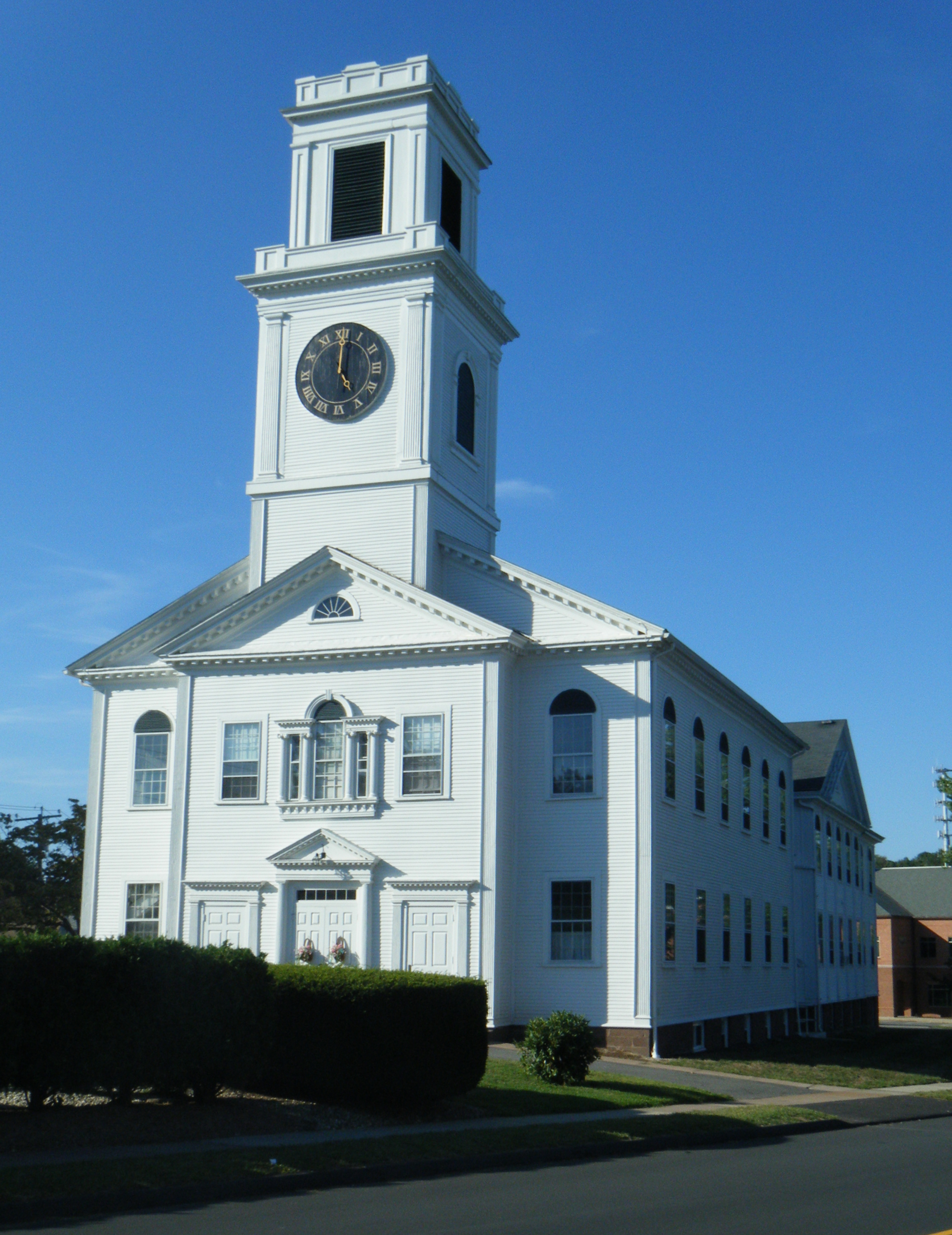

- Location within Connecticut Location within the United States
- Location: 805-817 Old Main Street, Rocky Hill, Connecticut
- Coordinates: 41°39′56″N 72°38′21″W
- Area: less than one acre
- Built: 1805
- Architect: Ackley, Elijah & Seth Dickenson
- Architectural style: Georgian
- Part of: Rocky Hill Center Historic District (ID07000111)
- NRHP reference No.: 82004438

Significant dates
- Added to NRHP: May 07, 1982
- Designated CP: March 9, 2007

The Rocky Hill Congregational Church is a historic church at 805-817 Old Main Street in Rocky Hill, Connecticut, USA. Built in 1808 for a 1723 congregation, it is a distinctive late example of Georgian architecture, and a prominent landmark in the town center. The building was listed on the National Register of Historic Places in 1982.

== Description and history ==
The Rocky Hill Congregational Church stands prominently in Rocky Hill's town center, on a triangular site encompassed by Church, Old Main, and Center Streets. It is a two-story gable-roof wood-frame structure resting on a brownstone foundation. It has distinctive late Georgian styling, with a projecting gabled entry section with corner pilasters, and three doorways. The central doorway is framed by engaged columns and topped by triangular modillioned pediment, while the flanking doorways are framed by pilasters and topped by an entablature and modillioned cornice. A three-stage square tower, housing a clock and belfry rises at a small setback from the projecting entry section.

The first church in Rocky Hill was built in 1727, after it was established as a separate parish of Wethersfield. By 1800 there were calls in the congregation for a new church. In 1805 it was agreed to build a new structure, modeled on a church in Middletown. Construction was begun the same year, and the new building was dedicated in 1808. After a lean period of membership in the late 19th century, the congregation rebounded, and funded construction of the adjacent parish house 1948–52 to a design by Kelly & Kelly architects. The building is noted for its fine Georgian features, and was documented in the 1830s as part of the Historic American Buildings Survey.

== See also ==
- National Register of Historic Places listings in Hartford County, Connecticut
