= Elm Street Historic District (Rocky Hill, Connecticut) =

Historic district in Connecticut, United States

- U.S. National Register of Historic Places
- U.S. Historic district
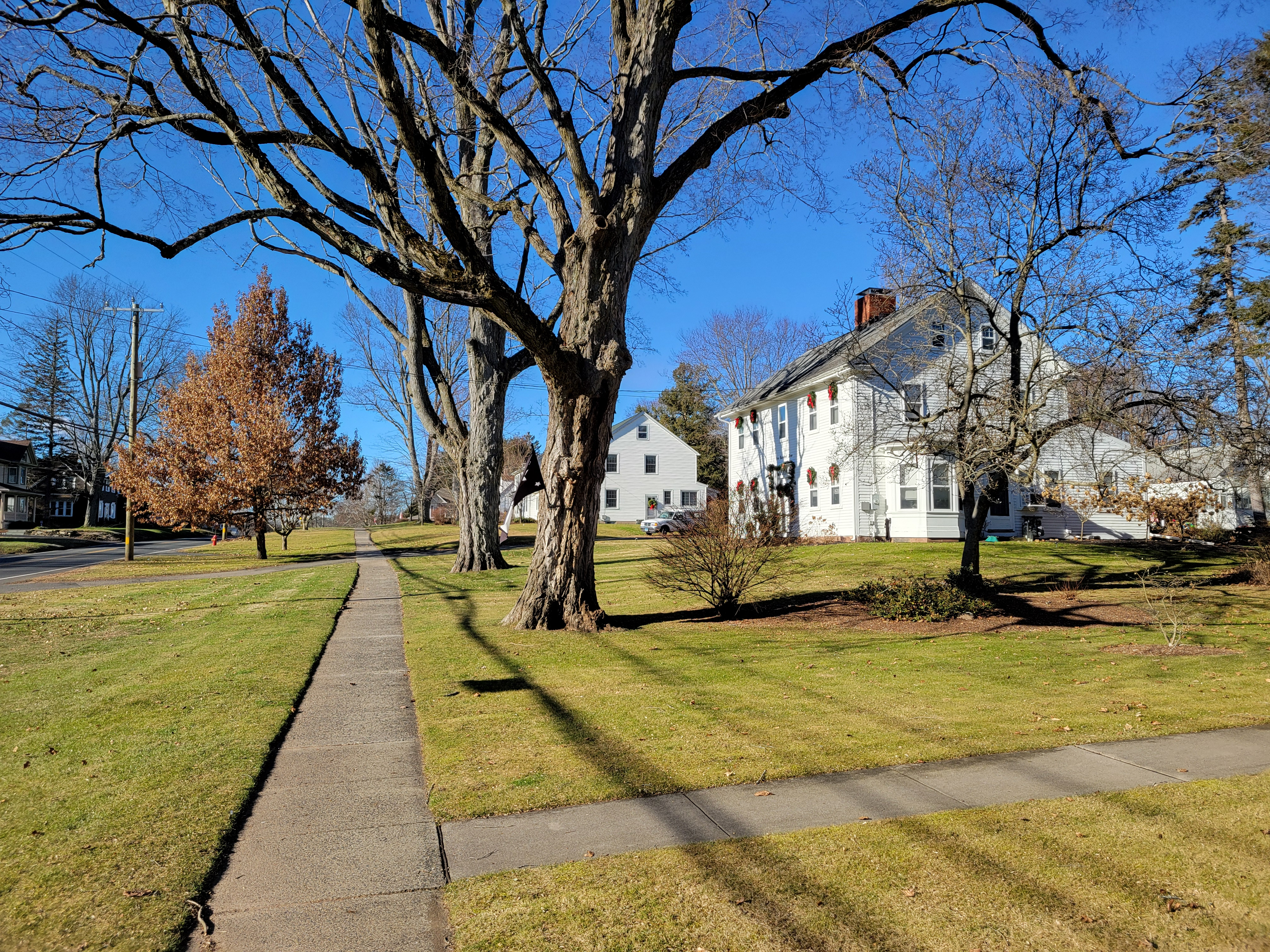
- Elm Street

- Location within Connecticut Location within the United States
- Location: 18-191 Elm Street, Rocky Hill, Connecticut
- Coordinates: 41°39′53″N 72°38′40″W
- Area: 20 acres (8.1 ha)
- Architectural style: Colonial, Greek Revival, Italianate
- NRHP reference No.: 98000358
- Added to NRHP: April 13, 1998

The Elm Street Historic District encompasses a colonial-era roadway layout and a cross-section of historical residential architecture styles in Rocky Hill, Connecticut. Elm Street between Silas Deane Highway and Grimes Road is an old colonial road, laid out in the late 17th century, and has retained an unusually wide right-of-way, typical for the period but rarely preserved. The houses lining it date from 1769 to the 1930s. The district was listed on the National Register of Historic Places in 1998.

== Description and history ==
Rocky Hill's Elm Street was laid out in the late 17th century, as a major road leading west from the Rocky Hill–Glastonbury ferry. This ferry (now seasonal) began service in 1655, and is believed to be the oldest continuously operating ferry in the United States. The road was laid out to a then-standard width of 20 rods, about 300 feet (91 m). This portion of the road has retained this width, with two rows of trees on its north side and one to its south filling out the right of way. The earliest surviving buildings, the oldest of which dates to 1769, are located near its junction with Chapin and Ashwell Streets.

The district includes 35 residential buildings, all but one of which are wood-frame structures 1-1/2 to 2 1/2 stories in height. The one exception is the brick house at 43 Elm Street, which is not historically significant. The main period in which houses were built in the district was the first quarter of the 20th. Examples of the Colonial Revival are the most numerous, with American Foursquare, Tudor Revival, and Craftsman/Bungalow styles also well represented. There are only three instances of the more ornate Italianate and Queen Anne styles (of which two are transitional), and three late Greek Revival buildings.

== See also ==
- National Register of Historic Places listings in Hartford County, Connecticut
