= Academy Hall (Rocky Hill, Connecticut) =

- U.S. National Register of Historic Places
- U.S. Historic district – Contributing property
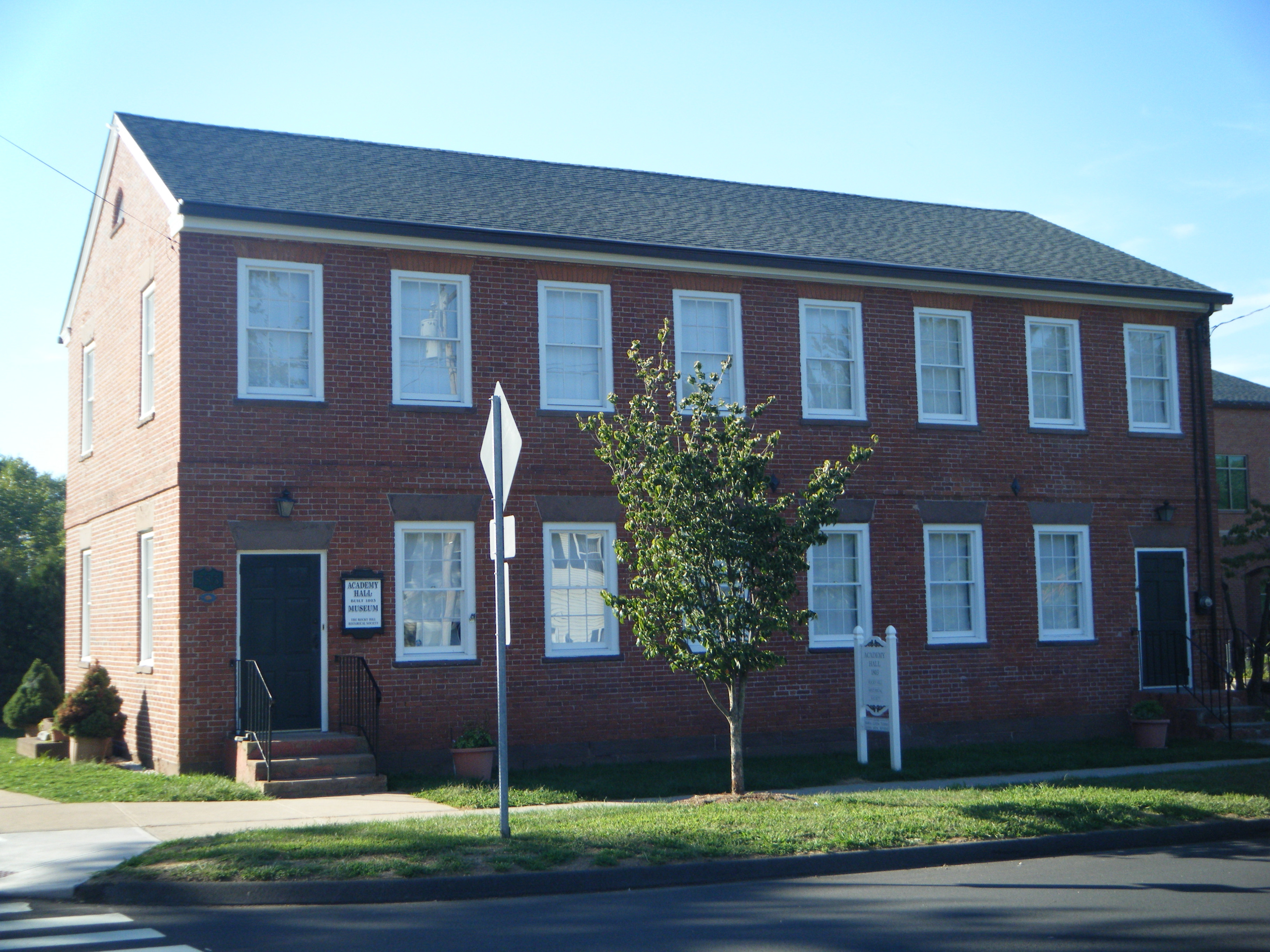
- Academy Hall, in 2010

- Location within Connecticut Location within the United States
- Location: 785 Old Main Street, Rocky Hill, Connecticut
- Coordinates: 41°39′58″N 72°38′20″W
- Area: less than one acre
- Built: 1803
- Architect: Jaggers, Abraham
- Architectural style: Federal
- Part of: Rocky Hill Center Historic District (ID07000111)
- NRHP reference No.: 77001419

Significant dates
- Added to NRHP: October 7, 1977
- Designated CP: March 9, 2007

Academy Hall is a historic former school building at 785 Old Main Street in Rocky Hill, Connecticut. Built in 1803, it is a well-preserved example of a Federal style academy. It was listed on the National Register of Historic Places in 1977. It presently houses the Academy Hall Museum of the Rocky Hill Historical Society.

== Description and history ==
The Academy Hall building is located in the center of Rocky Hill, on the west side of Old Main Street at Center Street. It stands between the town office building to the north and the Rocky Hill Congregational Church to the south. It is a 2 1/2-story brick building, with a side gable roof. It is eight bays wide and two deep, with entrances in the outer bays of the long facade. Ground floor windows and doorways are topped by splayed brownstone lintels, while the second-floor windows are set close to the eave. The brick is laid mainly in Flemish bond, with a belt course projecting slightly between the floors. The interior has been repeatedly altered over time and little original finish survives.

The academy was built in 1803 by Abraham Jaggars, and is one of only a few surviving early 19th-century school buildings in Connecticut. It is believed to be one of few original Federal style buildings in Connecticut that has seen little alteration to its exterior. The building served as a school from its construction until 1941. Originally a private school, it became a public school after it was gutted by fire in 1839. The public school operated in the ground floor until 1916, the upper level serving as a community center. After the adjacent Center School (now the town offices) was built in 1941, this school housed town offices, and later also hosted the local American Legion chapter. In 1963, the building, then in deteriorated condition, was leased by the Rocky Hill Historical Society, which undertook its restoration. The society museum opened in 1965.

== See also ==
- National Register of Historic Places listings in Hartford County, Connecticut
