= Joseph Robbins House =

Historic house in Massachusetts, United States

- U.S. National Register of Historic Places
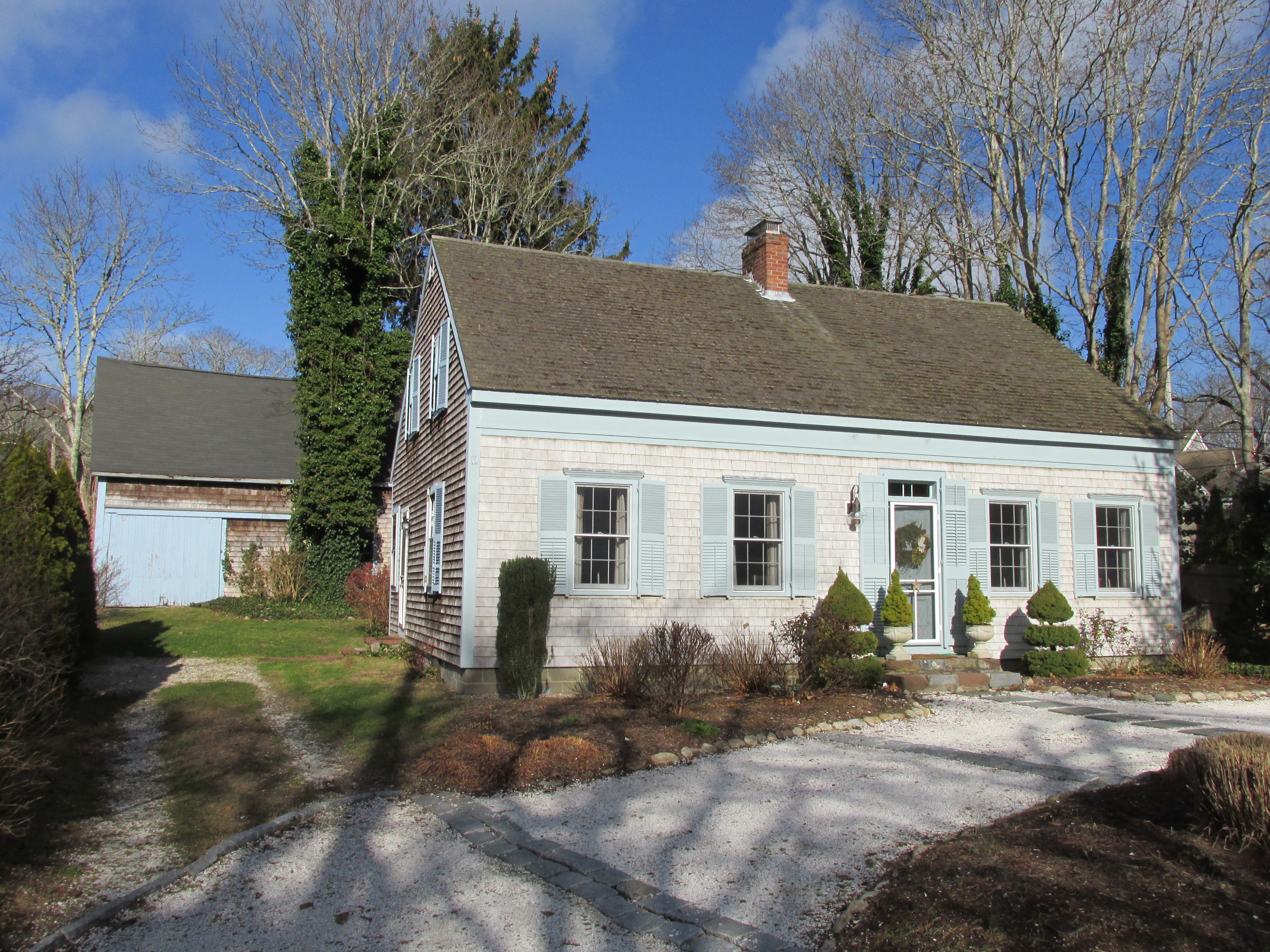
- Joseph Robbins House

- Location within Cape Cod Location within Massachusetts Location within the United States
- Location: 12 Bay Street, Barnstable, Massachusetts
- Coordinates: 41°37′44″N 70°23′18″W
- Built: 1820
- Architectural style: Greek Revival, Federal
- MPS: Barnstable MRA
- NRHP reference No.: 87000289
- Added to NRHP: November 10, 1987

The Joseph Robbins House is a historic house located in the Osterville village of Barnstable, Massachusetts, USA.

== Description and history ==
The wood-frame Cape style house was built c. 1820-30 by Joseph Robbins, a painter who is also known for painting the figurehead of the USS Constitution. It is a rare local example of Federal styling, with a multi-pane transom window over the main entrance. The house is a 1 1/2-story structure, five bays wide, with a side gable roof and a central chimney.

The house was listed on the National Register of Historic Places on November 10, 1987.

== See also ==
- National Register of Historic Places listings in Barnstable County, Massachusetts
