= John Robins (c. 1714 – 1754) =

English politician

John Robins (c. 1714 – 17 December 1754) was an English politician.

== Life ==
Robins was the eldest son of William Robins, Mayor of Stafford and Catherine Abnett, daughter of William Abnett, also a mayor of Stafford. He studied law at the Middle Temple and was called to the bar as a barrister in 1737.

In 1752, he was involved in a scandal after impregnating a widow Anne Whitby (nee Northey) and abandoning her. She swiftly married Sir William Wolseley, 5th Baronet, but Robins then proposed, and persuaded the clergyman to 'prove' that their marriage had occurred earlier, and that her marriage to the baronet was invalid. After the court found against him, he fled to France and died. Anne remarried.

== Career ==
Robins was a Member of Parliament for Stafford in 1747–1754.
