= Unni Robbins II House =

Historic house in Connecticut, United States

- U.S. National Register of Historic Places
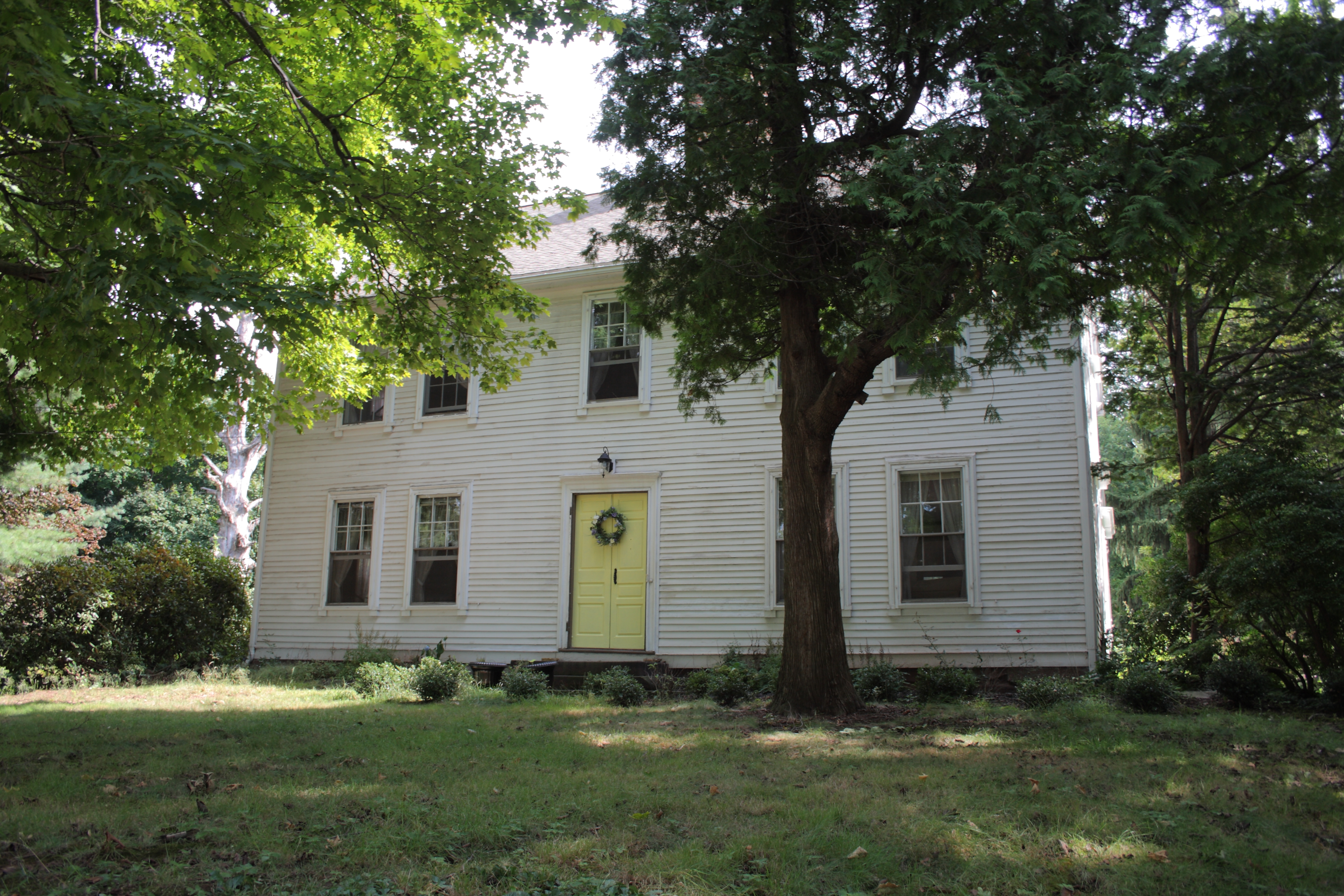

- Location within Connecticut Location within the United States
- Location: 1692 Main Street, Newington, Connecticut
- Coordinates: 41°41′9″N 72°43′17″W
- Area: 0.6 acres (0.24 ha)
- Built: 1792
- Architectural style: Colonial, Post Medieval English
- NRHP reference No.: 05001049
- Added to NRHP: September 21, 2005

The Unni Robbins II House is a historic house at 1692 Main Street in Newington, Connecticut. Built in 1792, it is a well-preserved example of Georgian architecture, notable for its particularly fine interior. It is also notable for its long association with locally prominent families. It was listed on the National Register of Historic Places in 2005.

== Description and history ==
The Unni Robbins II House is located in central Newington, south of the town center, on the east side of Main Street just south of Robbins Avenue. It is a 2 1/2-story wood-frame structure, with a side-gable roof, central chimney, and clapboarded exterior. It is set high above the road, with a fenced embankment separating the two. The main facade is five bays wide, with a center entrance framed by simple moulding. The interior follows a center chimney plan typical of mid-18th century houses, including a winding staircase in the entry vestibule. Interior walls are generally finished in plaster, with paneled fireplace walls and doors, and crown moulding at the ceiling. The main parlor also includes a builtin cabinet.

The house was built in 1792 for Unni Robbins II, a descendant of one of Connecticut's early 17th-century settlers, John Robbins. Its essentially Georgian character is fairly conservative, considering many more urbanized settings were already seeing Federal style housing at the time of its construction. The Robbinses were early settlers of the Newington area, which was until 1871 part of Wethersfield, and Unni III and his brother David Lowry Robbins were among the town's wealthiest landowners. Unni III's son Henry eventually reunited many Robbins family holdings, operating them as a gentleman farmer. The house was sold out of the family in 2001.

== See also ==
- Enoch Kelsey House, next door to the south
- National Register of Historic Places listings in Hartford County, Connecticut
