= George Robbins House =

Historic house in Massachusetts, United States

- U.S. National Register of Historic Places
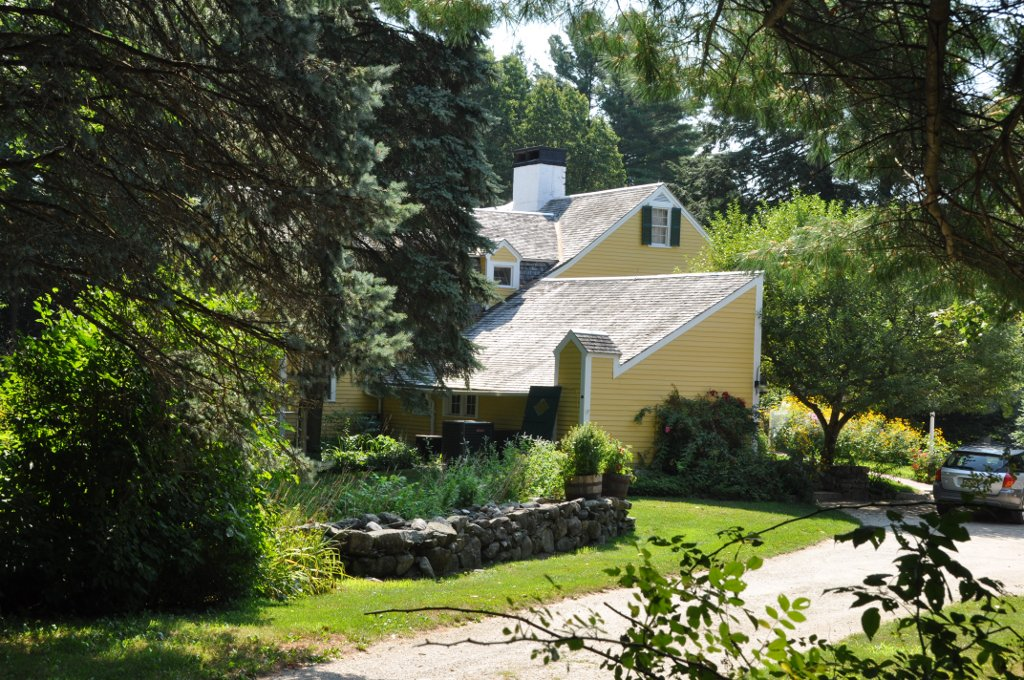

- Location within Massachusetts Location within the United States
- Location: 523 Curve Street, Carlisle, Massachusetts
- Coordinates: 42°33′11″N 71°21′5″W
- Built: 1700
- Architectural style: Colonial
- MPS: First Period Buildings of Eastern Massachusetts TR
- NRHP reference No.: 90000168
- Added to NRHP: March 9, 1990

The George Robbins House is a historic First Period house in Carlisle, Massachusetts. Although construction of the oldest portions of this house generally ascribed to George Robbins in c. 1660–70, stylistic analysis of its construction methods places its date of construction to c. 1700. It is a timber-frame house, five bays wide; its leanto is a late 18th-century addition, and the ell on the house's left dates to the 19th century, when some Greek Revival styling was added.

The house was listed on the National Register of Historic Places in 1990.

== See also ==
- List of the oldest buildings in Massachusetts
- National Register of Historic Places listings in Middlesex County, Massachusetts
