= John Robbins House (Rocky Hill, Connecticut) =

Historic house in Connecticut, United States

- U.S. National Register of Historic Places
- U.S. Historic district – Contributing property
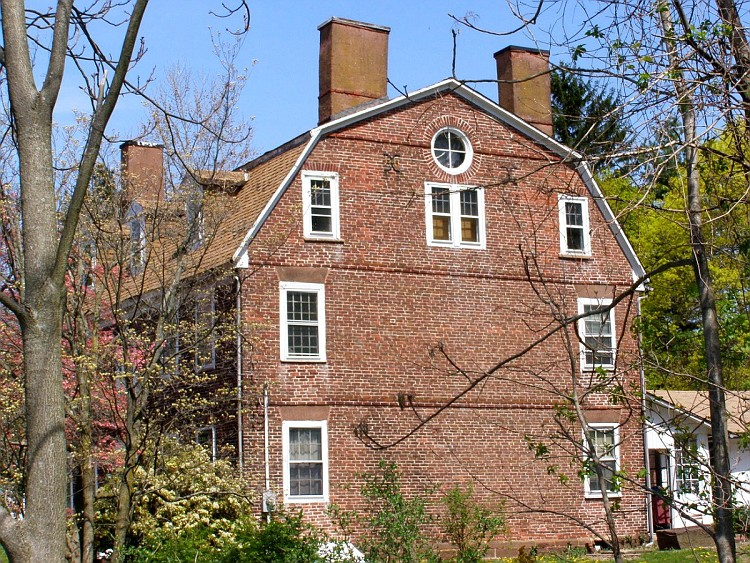

- Location within Connecticut Location within the United States
- Location: 262 Old Main Street, Rocky Hill, Connecticut
- Coordinates: 41°40′42″N 72°38′43″W
- Area: 1.6 acres (0.65 ha)
- Built: 1767
- Architectural style: Georgian
- Part of: Rocky Hill Center Historic District (ID07000111)
- NRHP reference No.: 88001526

Significant dates
- Added to NRHP: September 20, 1988
- Designated CP: March 9, 2007

The John Robbins House is a historic house at 262 Old Main Street in Rocky Hill, Connecticut. Normally attributed a construction date of 1767, it is considered one of the finest examples of brick Georgian architecture in the state. It was listed on the National Register of Historic Places in 1988.

== Description and history ==
The John Robbins House stands in northeastern Rocky Hill, on the east side of Old Main Street just north of its junction with Matteson Avenue. It is a 2 1/2-story masonry structure, built out of red brick supposedly fashioned from clay taken out of a local field. It has a five-bay front facade, with a transom window above the center entrance, and a Palladian window on the second level above the entrance. It has a gambrel roof, with chimneys at the ends, and three gabled dormers piercing the steep level of the roof. The side elevations each have a round window near the roof peak. A single-story gambrel-roofed ell extends to the rear. The interior follows a central hall plan, with four rooms on each floor, and a ballroom space in the attic level. Six of the rooms retain original period wood paneling, and the left parlor includes a period cabinet with flanking fluted pilasters.

The land on which the house stands, originally part of Wethersfield, was acquired in 1638 by John Robbins, the grandfather of the John Robbins who is supposed to have built this house. The grandson is conventionally claimed to have built this house in 1767, at which time he was operating a tavern called The Duke of Cumberland. A tavern sign, dated to 1773, supports the contention that this house was standing then. However, one architectural historian notes that the sign may have been associated with a different building, and suggests that the present house may have been built closer to 1790, in keeping with some of its early Federal period features, including the Palladian window and the lunette windows in the gables.

The house remained in the Robbins family until 1914.

== See also ==
- National Register of Historic Places listings in Hartford County, Connecticut
