= John Robbins House (Acton, Massachusetts) =

Historic house in Massachusetts, United States

- U.S. National Register of Historic Places
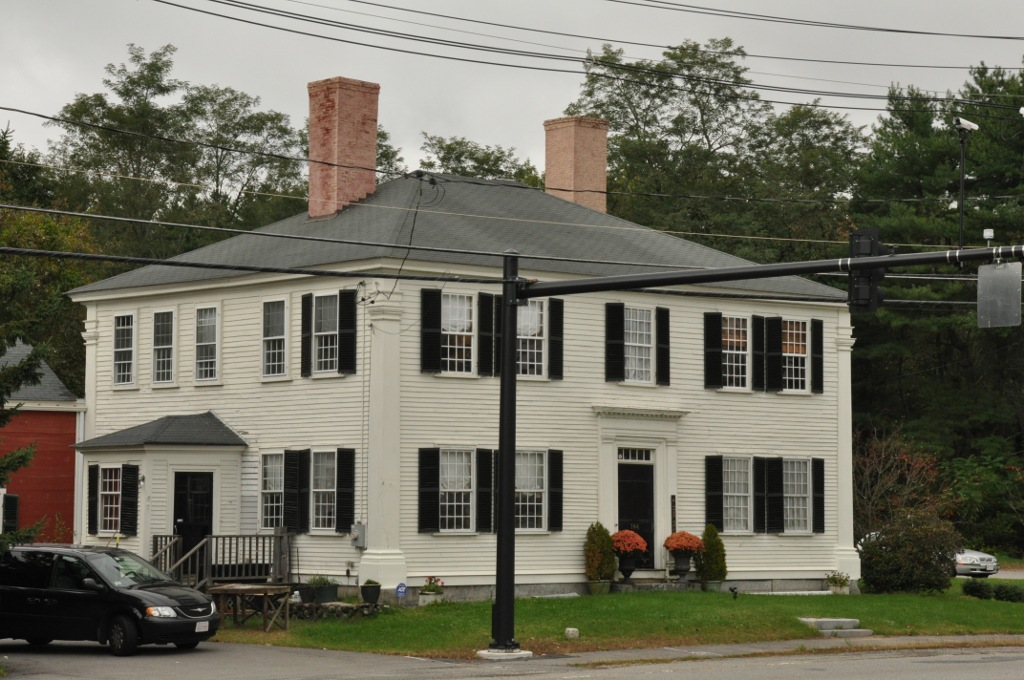

- Location within Massachusetts Location within the United States
- Location: 144 Great Road, Acton, Massachusetts
- Coordinates: 42°28′58″N 71°24′57″W
- Area: 1.08 acres (0.44 ha)
- Built: 1800
- Architectural style: Federal
- NRHP reference No.: 03000682
- Added to NRHP: July 25, 2003

The John Robbins House is a historic house at 144 Great Road in Acton, Massachusetts. Built in 1800, it is a well-preserved example of a late Georgian/early Federal country house, and was the farmhouse for one of Acton's largest 19th-century farms. The interior includes well-preserved period details, including stencilwork by the itinerant artist Moses Eaton, Jr. The house was listed on the National Register of Historic Places on July 25, 2003.

== Description and history ==
It is located on the south side of Great Road (Massachusetts Routes 2A and 119), which is now predominantly commercial. It is a two-story wood-frame structure, five bays wide, with a hip roof, twin interior chimneys, clapboard siding, and a stone foundation. Prominent features include the wide Doric pilasters at the corners, and the centered entrance, which is flanked by pilasters and topped by a transom window and entablature. The interior retains high-quality original woodwork, in the broad central hall and the front rooms. The main stairwell includes original and unrestored stencilwork by Moses Eaton, Jr.

The house is notable as one of four built in Acton as the result of a lottery sponsored by Harvard College in 1794–95. The lottery was one of several run by the college to raise funds for the construction of buildings and acquisition of land. One of the grand prizes in this lottery was awarded to a ticket shared by four Acton residents, who divided the $10,000 prize, and each built a house. This house, built by Joseph Robbins, is the best-preserved of the four.

The house was purchased by Lawrence Powers from the Nylander family and after extensive renovation is now the home of Powers Gallery. Visitors are welcome Tuesday Through Saturday 10-5:00.

== See also ==
- National Register of Historic Places listings in Middlesex County, Massachusetts
