= Great Meadows National Wildlife Refuge =

River wetlands conservation area in Massachusetts

- IUCN category IV (habitat/species management area)
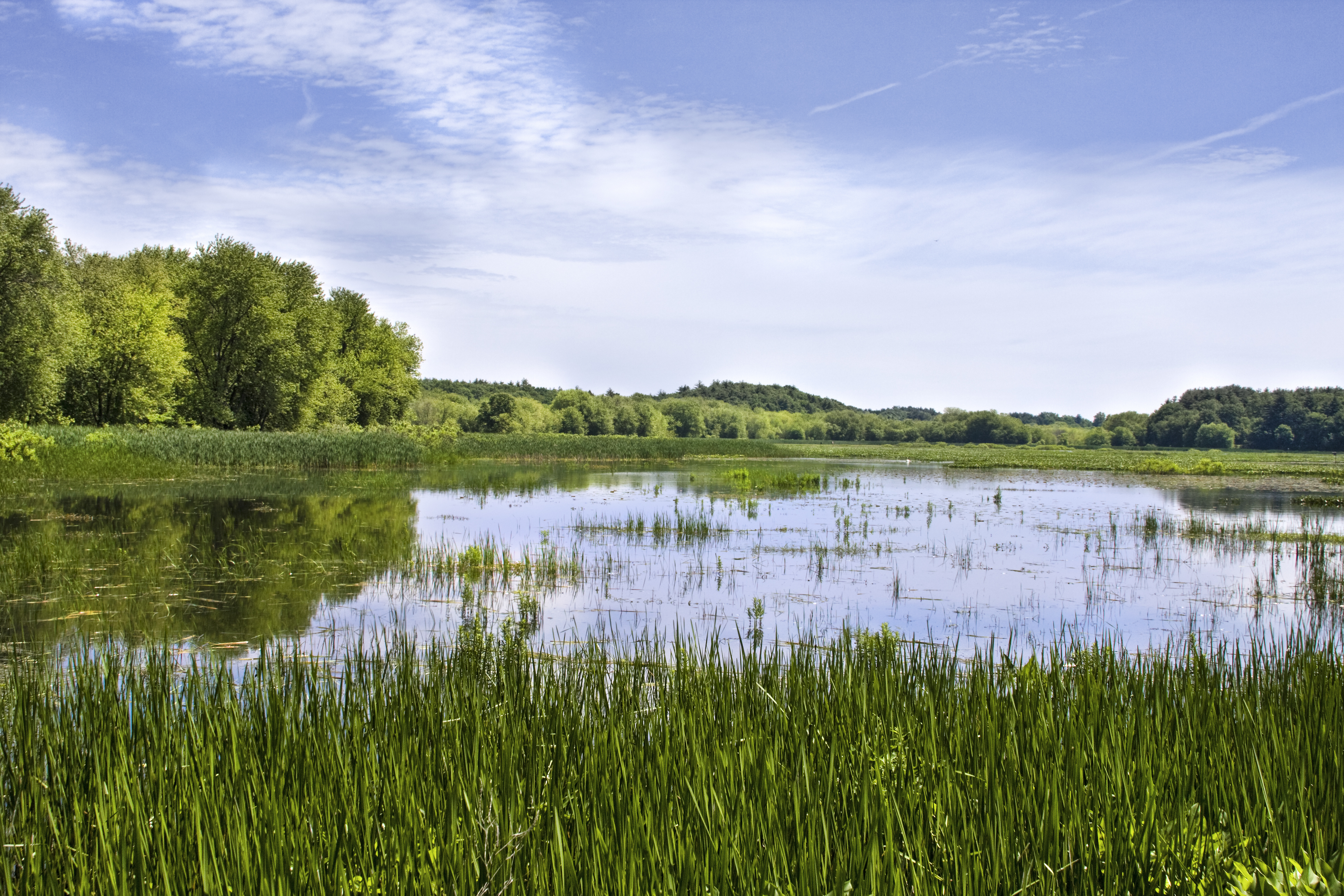
- View of Great Meadows, Concord

- Location within Massachusetts
- Location: Concord, Massachusetts, Sudbury, Massachusetts, United States
- Nearest city: Concord, Massachusetts
- Coordinates: 42°28′30″N 71°19′47″W
- Area: 250 acres (100 ha)
- Established: 1944
- Governing body: U.S. Fish and Wildlife Service
- Website: Great Meadows National Wildlife Refuge

The Great Meadows National Wildlife Refuge is a 12-mile-long (19 km) river wetlands conservation area, in two major parcels, stretching from the towns of Billerica, Massachusetts (downstream) to Wayland, Massachusetts (upstream), along the Concord River and Sudbury River.

Part of the National Wildlife Refuge system, the park is a popular destination for bird watchers and tourists. About 85 percent of the refuge's 3,600 acres (15 km^{2}) is freshwater wetlands.

== History ==
The original 250-acre (1.0 km^{2}) Concord, Massachusetts parcel that was the beginning nucleus of the sanctuary, has been known as the "Great Meadows" since the 17th century. The parcel was donated to the U.S. Government by Concord resident D. Samuel Hoar in 1944. Hoar purchased a part of the Meadows in 1928, and built earthen dams (dikes) to hold the water within the marshlands, enhancing their value as waterfowl habitat for hunting. To provide greater protection for the area’s wetlands and wildlife, the U.S. Fish and Wildlife Service began buying additional land during the 1960s.

== Wildlife and protected species ==
A great diversity of birds have been recorded at the refuge, including nesting waterfowl: mallards, black ducks, wood ducks, and blue-winged teal. White-tailed deer, muskrats, red fox, raccoons, cottontail rabbits, weasels, beaver, squirrels, and a variety of small mammals are common. Many species of amphibians and reptiles are active during the warmer months.

The Concord unit is primarily two small lakes (referred to as "pools" or "impoundments") that are drained into the Concord River every summer. The resulting mudflats provide ideal feeding grounds for many species of shore birds and waterfowl that migrate in mid to late summer. In late July and in August, there will be wide range of birds at these feeding grounds, including various species of sandpipers, killdeer, lesser and greater yellowlegs, and great egrets. Large numbers of great blue herons, ducks and Canada geese are also attracted to these muddy and nutrient-rich feeding grounds.

== Access and facilities ==
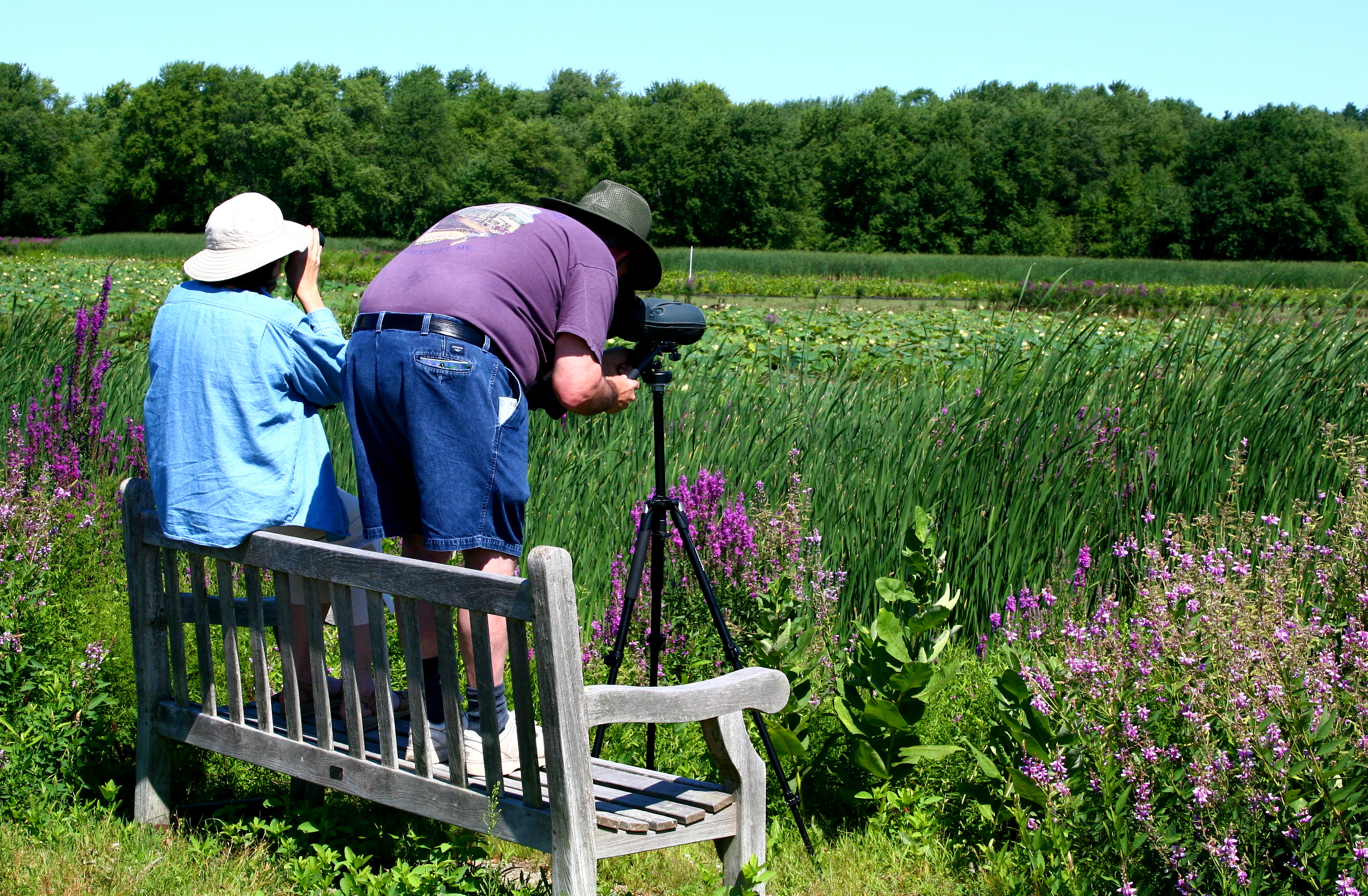
Bird watchers in the Concord unit of the refuge

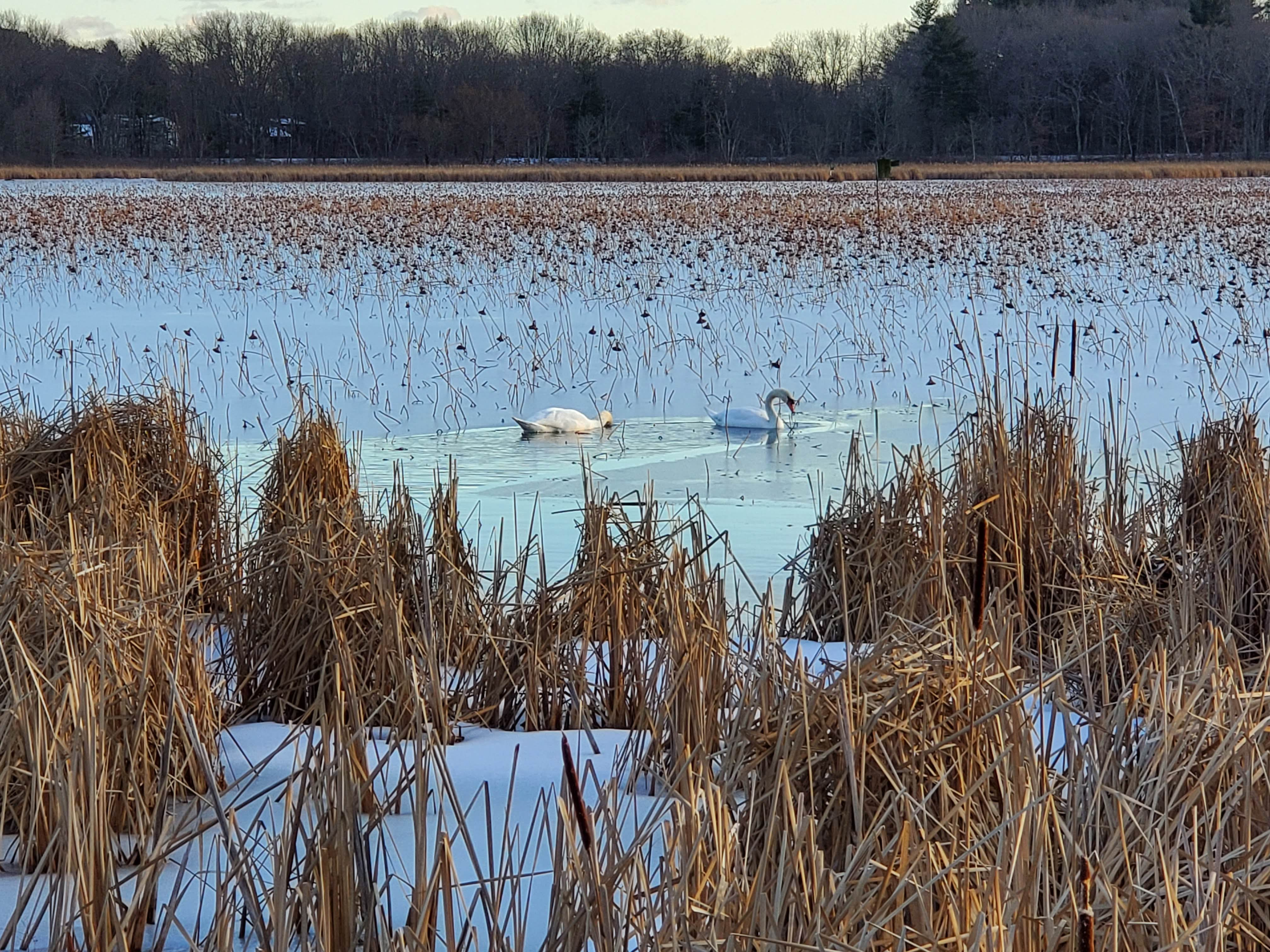
Swans in the Concord unit in winter

The Sudbury unit of the refuge is open daily from dawn to dusk. It has two trails as well as the refuge headquarters and a visitor center, which is open on weekdays. A section of the Mass Central Rail Trail—Wayside is in design that will pass through the refuge. Construction is estimated to begin in Winter 2027.

The Concord unit is open daily from dawn to dusk; it includes 2.7 miles (4.3 km) of trails.

== See also ==
- List of National Wildlife Refuges of the United States
