= The Concord Female Anti-Slavery Society =

US female abolitionist organization

The Concord Female Anti-Slavery Society (founded 1837) was a female abolitionist organisation in Concord, Massachusetts, in the mid 19th century. This society was a significant influence on Henry David Thoreau, Ralph Waldo Emerson, and Louisa May Alcott.

== Concord, Massachusetts ==
The town of Concord, Massachusetts, was founded in 1635 by a group of English settlers, with the help of their slaves to build the foundation of the town. During the early 1830s Concord, like most other cities in North America, was largely pro-slavery with only a small amount of the 2000-person population in support of abolitionism. By 1839 Massachusetts hosted over 240 local anti-slavery societies, despite Concord having no official abolitionist efforts before 1833. The black population of Concord never rose above 3% (Lemire, 9) and was estimated to be only 1% in the early 1830s.

In 1850, the Fugitive Slave Law was introduced, requiring that escaped slaves be returned to their masters. The law still applied to slaves who were in a ‘free state'. This Law saw an increase in support for abolitionism. Many Concord residents housed and provided support to fugitive slaves. A Concord local, Ann Bigelow stated that fugitive slaves were being hidden nearly every week during the 1850s. Abby and Amos Alcott (parents of Louisa May Alcott) as well as the Thoreau and Brooks' households assisted in housing fugitive slaves.

== Emergence of abolitionism ==
The Concord Female Anti-Slavery Society (CFASS) was founded officially in 1837, however there is a longer history to abolitionism in Massachusetts. A man who went by the name "Felix", possibly an enslaved person working for Mary and Abia Holbrook, was the first black individual to successfully lobby the local government in Boston to question slavery in Massachusetts and in the country. In 1773, Felix's petition was printed in "The Appendix; Or, Some Observations on the Expediency of the Petitions of the Africans, living in Boston". The Petition of 6 January 1773 was called by Felix a "humble petition" which confronted executive and legislative bodies in Boston, and he put forward the petition on behalf of enslaved people living in Boston and "other towns". This petition brought attention to abolitionism which eventually manifested in more abolitionist movements in Massachusetts and slavery's abolition in December 1865. The conditions for activism and social change became stronger with the colonist's escalating conflict with England during the 1770s, combined with the cumulative frustration of enslaved people as slavery had expanded in Massachusetts between the 1720s and 1760s. Throughout the 1770s activism took more footholds in society as enslaved and free black Americans along with white abolitionists started petitions, asserted their rights and defined their conditions, wrote letters and enacted change and traction regarding abolition. By 1775 The African Lodge, a branch of Freemasonry established by Prince Hall and 14 other free black men became the oldest black institution in America. In 1829 The African Lodge aided the black activist David Walker in while he was living in Boston, Massachusetts. This is where he published his "An Appeal to the Colored Citizens of the World", which called for black unity, equality and the fight against slavery. This document was critical to the anti-slavery, abolitionist and black empowerment movement in Massachusetts and in America. The CFASS was founded seven years after Walker's Appeal.

== Women in abolitionism ==
For women, abolitionism was a religious issue, and their involvement was based within the traditional view of women as more pious and responsible as moral arbiters. Female abolitionists saw slavery as "a sin that, as women, they had a moral and religious duty to eradicate. The Evangelical Revivalism of the 2nd Great Awakening saw people as capable of working for their own salvation, and the "moral perfection" of society. Abolitionism was one of many social reform movements that emerged out of this, in which women had prominent roles. Women's public abolitionism was controversial, and the General Association of Massachusetts Congregational Churches criticised their involvement as "obtrusive and ostentatious." Mary Brooks saw abolitionism as a religious issue, stating in 1843 that the founding of the society would help turn "our world of sin and misery into a world of purity, holiness, and happiness."

The Concord Freeman encouraged women's involvement in abolitionism as men had "faltered... in their duty." Mary Brooks echoed this, stating that God "had placed this cause... in the hands of women." Women's involvement, due to their perceived virtue, helped legitimise abolitionism. Women's involvement also turned abolitionism into a mass movement. In 1837 and 1838, 340 women signed memorials to congress against slavery compared with 130 men.

The abolitionist movement served as a way for women to overcome the social obstacles that saw women's roles as domestic. Abolitionism justified a political identity through the language of female religious duty.

== Activities ==
Robert Gross states that women were "the foot soldiers of reform," in abolitionism. Women sponsored speakers, disseminated anti-slavery publications, and engaged in petitioning. They hosted fairs that turned their domestic work into abolitionist work, and raised funds for abolitionism. Women were also engaged with other anti-slavery organisations, and attended national anti-slavery conventions. Some women, wrote for anti-slavery newspapers, often anonymously, the CFASS annual reports were also published in The Liberator. People in Concord also participated in the underground railroad. During the Civil War they supported the war effort, and after the war they went "door to door" to get relief for the newly freed African American population.

== History ==
In 1837 abolitionists Angelina and Sarah Grimké visited Concord and lectured at the Trinitarian Parish of Reverend Wilder, creating interest for abolitionism at Concord. On October 18, 1837, 61 women gathered together to found the CFASS. Mary Wilder, the wife of Reverend Wilder, was elected president, Helen Thoreau, the sister of Henry Thoreau, was elected vice president, and Mary Merrick Brooks was elected secretary and treasurer. Mary Brooks remembered the founding as "an event noticed but little by the inhabitants of the town, or noticed but to be ridiculed; nevertheless an event which is destined to have an immense bearing on the temporal and eternal interests of its founders, and do not a little towards swelling that great tide of humanity, which is finally to turn our world of sin and misery into a world of purity, holiness, and happiness."

Between 1837 and 1839 the CFASS participated in the country-wide anti-slavery petitioning drive. A petition opposing the annexation of Texas was signed by over half the women in Concord and a fifth of the men. In 1838, 340 women and 130 men put their names on memorials to congress against slavery.

In 1837 Mary Brooks, the Wards, the Thoreau's and the Emerson's organised a public meeting in response to the Indian Removal Acts, in support of the Indians of Georgia. Mary Brooks wrote to Angeline Grimké to urge her to speak out against it. At the urging of Mary Brooks, Lidian Emerson and Prudence Ward, Waldo Emerson spoke at this event.

In May 1838 Mary Brooks and her stepdaughter Caroline represented Concord at the second meeting of the Anti-Slavery Convention of American Women. In the same year Abolitionism in New England split as many abolitionists disagreed with Garrison's radicalism and the public involvement of women. This split ended many female anti-slavery societies, the CFASS survived but in 1942 Maria Thoreau and others left the CFASS and started the Ladies' Emancipation Society.

In 1840 116 townspeople protested the gag rule, three quarters of the signers were women. During the 1840s both Mary Brooks and Helen Thoreau left the Unitarian church over its complicity in slavery. In 1842 17 men and 108 women signed a petition calling on Massachusetts house to eliminate the state law banning interracial marriage. In 1842 the Political Abolitionists, in the Liberty Party, who had split with Garrison advocated for the securing of a ‘personal liberty law' that prevented fugitive slaves who fled to Massachusetts from being returned. This movement united abolitionism, and was supported by 352 in Concord. In the 1840s Henry Thoreau became secretary of the Concord Lyceum. In 1842, Thoreau supported by the CFASS invited the abolitionist Wendell Phillips to speak there. This was the first-time abolitionism had been discussed at the Concord Lyceum. Phillips was invited again in 1844.

The 1843 annual report of the CFASS written by Mary Brooks reflected abolitionism's renewed energy and the "perfectionist spirit of the times." She states that they sponsored lecturers, hosted a fundraising fair, and circulated petitions.

In June 1844, Helen Thoreau was secretary pro tem for the Middlesex County Anti-Slavery Society. In August the CFASS sponsored the first annual celebration of the anniversary of West Indian Emancipation, where Waldo Emerson, persuaded by Mary Brooks, made his first "unequivocal" anti-slavery statement. Mrs Prudence Ward died in 1844 and the CFASS published a memorial for her.

In 1846 Louisa and Anna Whiting among others attended the New England Anti-Slavery Convention.

In 1849 Helen Thoreau died and William Lloyd Garrison wrote her eulogy in the Liberator.

In 1850 the Fugitive Slave Act was passed, leading to more abolitionist activity During the 1850s, according to Ann Bigelow interviewed in 1892, fugitive slaves were hidden nearly every week in Concord. Many in Concord were involved in the underground railroad, including Abigail and Amos Alcott, Louisa May Alcott's parents.

In 1853 Harriet Tubman spoke at Concord.

In 1862 Mary Rice and Mary Mann collected the signatures of 350 Concord school children asking Abraham Lincoln to free all the slaves. He asked them to tell the students that he didn't "have the power", but they should "remember" that God did.

Throughout the Civil War the CFASS supported the war efforts, and after the war sought relief for freedmen.

== The CFASS, Henry Thoreau and Waldo Emerson ==
Petrulionis suggests that the women of the CFASS had a significant influence on their male relatives and friends, encouraging men like Ralph Waldo Emerson and Henry Thoreau to take up abolitionism.

Ralph Waldo Emerson, the husband of CFASS member Lidian Emerson, influenced by family and friends gradually entered the anti-slavery camp. From 1821 onward, the topic of slavery appeared frequently in Emerson's private and public writings. In 1826, he mentioned "the slave's misery" in a sermon. In 1838, he wrote to President Van Buren protesting the expulsion of the Cherokees from their homes. His speech in Concord, Massachusetts, on August 1, 1844, is considered to be his most extensive and important anti-slavery statement. On the tenth anniversary of emancipation in the British West Indies Emerson expressed his sympathy for slaves, refuted the actions of slavery proponents, and supported the antislavery movement. In November of 1844 when the New Bedford Lyceum invited him to speak, he declined and boycotted it because he opposed their racist membership policies. Emerson denounced, the Fugitive Slave Act as "this filthy enactment." In an open letter published The Liberator in 1851, Emerson called on citizens to resist it and to use force, if necessary, to provide "substantial help and hospice care for slaves." Meanwhile, to Concord's female abolitionists, Emerson argued that women were at the vanguard of social reform: "Any remarkable opinion or movement shared by women will be the first sign of revolution".

Henry David Thoreau, was also associated with abolitionism. In 1946 article Nick Aaron Ford argued that Thoreau was an abolitionist. In the late 1830s, he graduated from Harvard, and supported abolitionism by signing a petition opposing the annexation of Texas. Although the movement attracted at most a third of Concord's population, almost all of the Thoreau family was involved, including his mother (Cynthia Thoreau) and sisters (Helen Thoreau and Sophia Thoreau), who were also prominent members of the CFASS. However, after a few years Thoreau withdrew from the fold, because he wanted to be "a man in reserve". Less publicly, he helped fugitive slaves escape to Canada, and when a black man in Boston was unjustly convicted of murder, he signed his name to a protest launched by 400 residents. In 1842, Thoreau's refusal to pay the poll tax in opposition to Slavery led to his arrest and imprisonment in July 1846, which was paid for by someone (probably Maria Thoreau), and he was released the next day. In May 1849, in his political treatise "Resistance to Civil Government," he maintained the position that when a pro-slavery government waged an unjust war, honest people should rebel; when the government abolished slavery, it would earn the people's respect.
