= Rocky Hill, Connecticut =

- Town
- Town of Rocky Hill
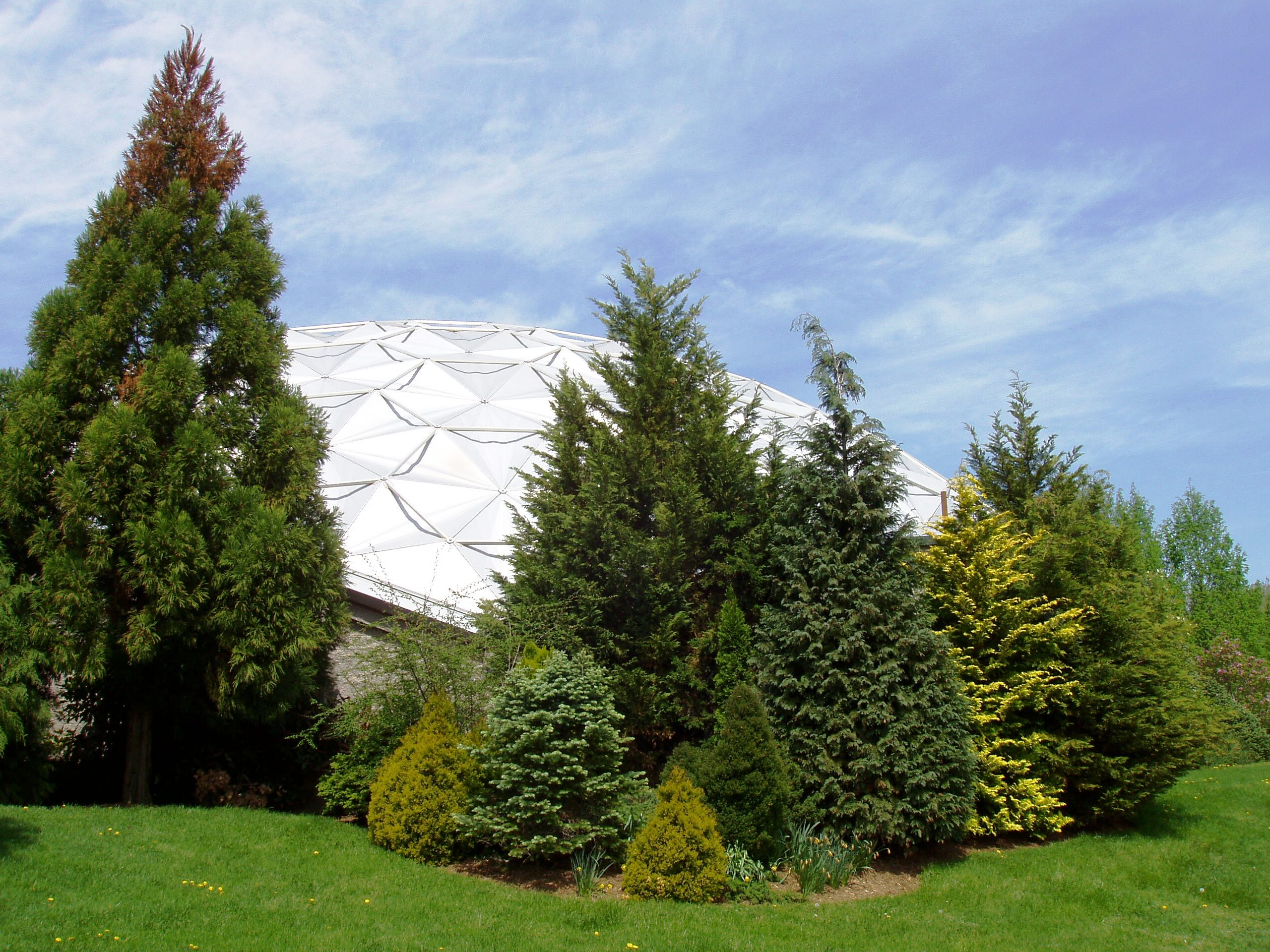
- Dinosaur State Park and Arboretum

- Flag Seal

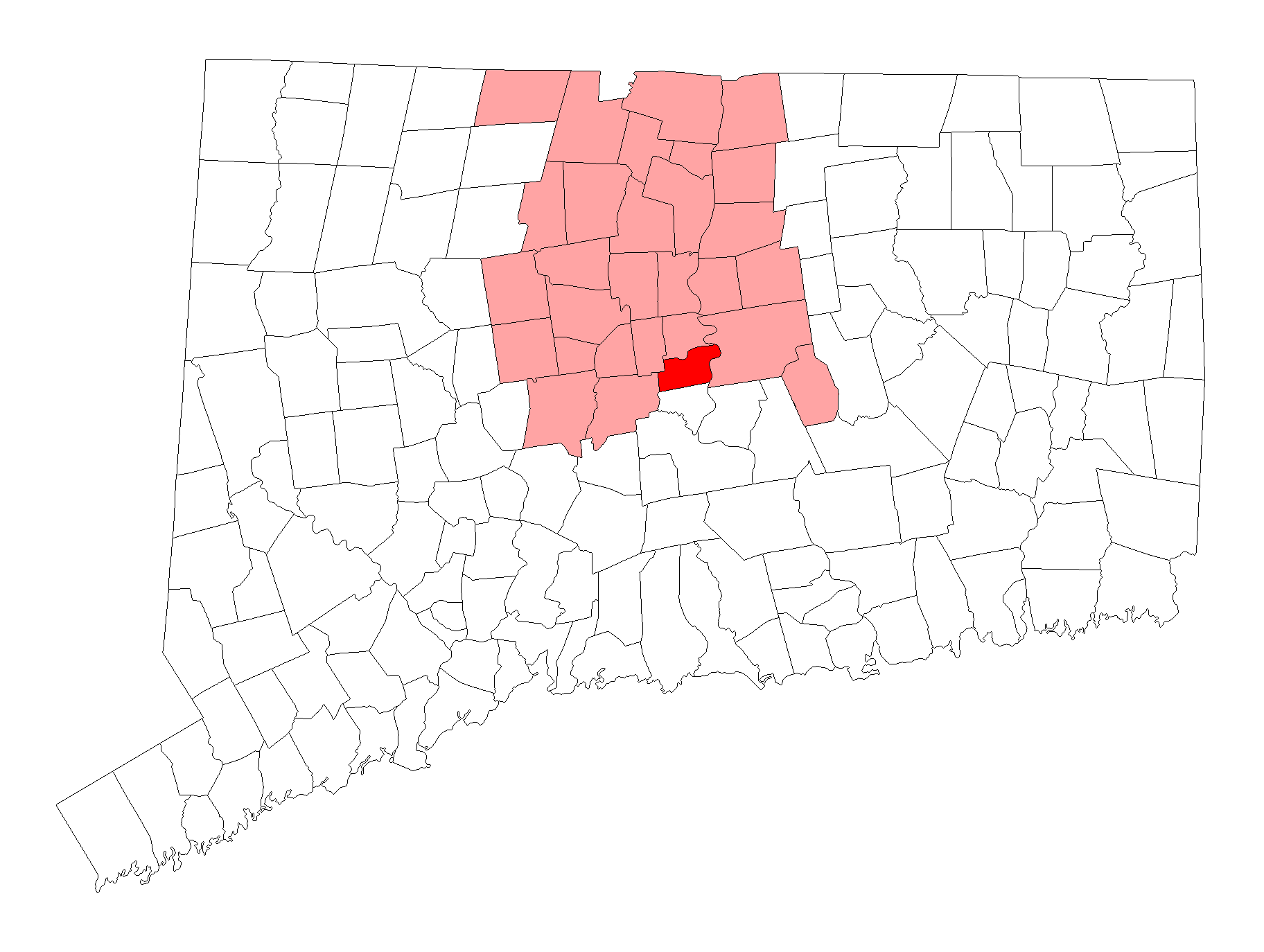
- Coordinates: 41°39′26″N 72°39′36″W
- Country: United States
- U.S. state: Connecticut
- County: Hartford
- Region: Capitol Region
- Incorporated: 1843

Government
  - Type: Council-manager
  - Town manager: Raymond Carpentino
  - Town Council: Mayor: Allan Smith (D); Deputy Mayor: Mimi Theroux (D); Town Councilors: John Emmanuel (D); Francis Whelan III (R); Zachary Michael Van Luling (D); David Sevigny (R); Mukesh Desai (D); Pankaj Prakash (R); Melissa Green Kaplan (D)

Area
  - Total: 13.8 sq mi (35.8 km^{2})
  - Land: 13.4 sq mi (34.8 km^{2})
  - Water: 0.39 sq mi (1.0 km^{2})
- Elevation: 223 ft (68 m)

Population (2020)
  - Total: 20,845
  - Density: 1,550/sq mi (599/km^{2})
- Time zone: UTC−5 (Eastern)
  - Summer (DST): UTC−4 (Eastern)
- ZIP Code: 06067
- Area codes: 860/959
- FIPS code: 09-65370
- GNIS feature ID: 0213497
- Website: www.rockyhillct.gov

Rocky Hill is a town in Hartford County, Connecticut, United States. The town is part of the Capitol Planning Region. The population was 20,845 at the 2020 census. It was originally land of the Wangunks (a tribe of Native Americans). Europeans began to settle the area of Rocky Hill in 1650, as part of Wethersfield, the neighboring town to the north. In 1722, the area became known as Stepney Parish, until it was independently incorporated in 1843. Rocky Hill’s location on the Connecticut River made it a natural port for Wethersfield and an early center for shipbuilding, agriculture, and trade.

Rocky Hill is a typical bedroom community, as many residents commute to work in the larger urban centers of Hartford to the north and New Haven to the south.

Rocky Hill is the home to the Dinosaur State Park. Rocky Hill also was once the headquarters of Ames Department Stores, which ceased business operations in 2002.

== Geography ==
According to the United States Census Bureau, the town has a total area of 13.8 square miles (35.8 km^{2}), of which 13.4 square miles (34.8 km^{2}) is land and 0.39 square miles (1.0 km^{2}) (2.78%) is water.

Bordering Rocky Hill to the north is Wethersfield, with Newington to the northwest, Berlin to the southwest, and Cromwell to the south. The Connecticut River forms the eastern border. Interstate 91 runs through the town with exits at the two main local highways, Route 3 at exit 23 and Route 99 at exit 24. Route 3 travels from Cromwell through Rocky Hill into Wethersfield, eventually crossing the Connecticut River into Glastonbury. The north-south Route 99 parallels the Connecticut River for the length of town.

The town of Rocky Hill is named after the ridge along the Connecticut River in the northeastern section that is now Rocky Hill Quarry Park.

== Demographics ==
Historical population
Year	Pop.	±%
1850	1,042	—
1860	1,102	+5.8%
1870	971	−11.9%
1880	1,108	+14.1%
1890	1,069	−3.5%
1900	1,026	−4.0%
1910	1,187	+15.7%
1920	1,633	+37.6%
1930	2,021	+23.8%
1940	2,679	+32.6%
1950	5,108	+90.7%
1960	7,404	+44.9%
1970	11,103	+50.0%
1980	14,559	+31.1%
1990	16,554	+13.7%
2000	17,966	+8.5%
2010	19,709	+9.7%
2020	20,845	+5.8%

As of the 2000 Census, Rocky Hill had a population of 17,966 in 7,557 households, with 4,519 families residing in the town. The population density was 1,335.4 inhabitants per square mile (515.6/km^{2}). There were 7,962 housing units at an average density of 591.8 per square mile (228.5/km^{2}). The racial makeup of the town was 90.20% White, 3.42% African American, 0.11% Native American, 3.97% Asian, 0.03% Pacific Islander, 1.01% from other races, and 1.27% from two or more races. Hispanic or Latino people of any race were 3.20% of the population.

There were 7,557 households, out of which 24.9% had children under the age of 18 living with them, 48.9% were married couples living together, 7.9% had a female householder with no husband present, and 40.2% were non-families. Of all households 32.5% were made up of individuals, and 9.7% had someone living alone who was 65 years of age or older. The average household size was 2.26 and the average family size was 2.93.

In terms of age, 19.7% of the population were under the age of 18, 6.1% were between 18 and 24, 31.9% were 25 to 44, 25.8% were 45 to 64, and 16.5% were 65 or older. The median age was 41 years. For every 100 females, there were 97.6 males. For every 100 females age 18 and over, there were 95.7 males.

The median household income in the town was $60,247, and the median income for a family was $72,726. Males had a median income of $48,555 versus $39,625 for females. The per capita income for the town was $29,701. About 1.2% of families and 2.9% of the population were below the poverty line, including 1.8% of those under age 18 and 3.0% of those age 65 or over.

== Education ==
Rocky Hill High School has a student body of approximately 800 students. Albert D. Griswold Middle School enrolls about 600 students. Moser Intermediate School enrolls about 500 students. Stevens Elementary School enrolls about 500 students. West Hill Elementary School enrolls around 525 students.

== Government ==
Rocky Hill is currently governed under the Council-Manager form of government. The Town Council is the legislative body for the Town of Rocky Hill, and eight members are elected to serve two year terms. The Mayor, elected separately, is a member and presiding official of the Council with the power to vote.

Rocky Hill town vote by party in presidential elections
Year	Democratic	Republican	Third Parties
2024	52.56% 5,471	45.80% 4,767	1.64% 171
2020	55.89% 6,115	42.69% 4,670	1.42% 155
2016	51.74% 5,090	44.02% 4,331	4.24% 417
2012	55.57% 5,173	43.29% 4,030	1.14% 106
2008	59.27% 5,957	39.31% 3,951	1.42% 143
2004	56.21% 5,488	42.33% 4,133	1.46% 143
2000	59.96% 5,184	37.51% 3,243	2.53% 219
1996	56.19% 4,640	31.90% 2,634	11.91% 983
1992	43.31% 4,091	34.60% 3,269	22.09% 2,087
1988	50.46% 4,052	48.71% 3,911	0.83% 67
1984	40.10% 3,159	59.47% 4,685	0.43% 34
1980	42.91% 3,187	41.12% 3,054	15.97% 1,186
1976	49.00% 3,352	50.46% 3,452	0.54% 37
1972	43.43% 2,493	55.84% 3,206	0.73% 42
1968	53.53% 2,616	40.64% 1,986	5.83% 285
1964	70.07% 2,657	29.93% 1,135	0.00% 0
1960	54.22% 1,894	45.78% 1,599	0.00% 0
1956	37.16% 1,077	62.84% 1,821	0.00% 0
1952	42.59% 1,126	57.26% 1,514	0.15% 4
1948	48.35% 835	50.55% 873	1.10% 19
1944	47.21% 702	52.79% 785	0.00% 0
1940	46.28% 598	53.72% 694	0.00% 0
1936	45.52% 406	54.48% 486	0.00% 0
1932	35.64% 258	64.36% 466	0.00% 0
1928	30.55% 216	68.74% 486	0.71% 5
1924	30.00% 126	67.38% 283	2.62% 11
1920	30.55% 216	68.74% 486	0.71% 5
1916	42.58% 109	55.47% 142	1.95% 5
1912	38.71% 96	43.55% 108	17.74% 44
1908	31.34% 68	68.20% 148	0.46% 1
1904	35.65% 82	63.48% 146	0.87% 2
1900	38.89% 91	60.26% 141	0.85% 2

=== Federal ===
Congressional Representatives
Representative	Chamber	Party
Richard Blumenthal	Senate	Dem
Chris Murphy	Senate	Dem
John Larson	House of Representatives	Dem

=== State ===
General Assembly Representatives
Representative	Chamber	District	Party
Matthew Lesser	Senate	9th	Dem
Kerry Wood	House of Representatives	29th	Dem

=== Town Council ===
Members of the Rocky Hill Town Council
Name	Seat	Party
Allan Smith	Mayor	Dem
John Emmanuel	Seat 1	Dem
Francis Whelan III	Seat 2	Rep
Zachary Michael Van Luling	Seat 4	Dem
David Sevigny	Seat 5	Rep
Mukesh Desai	Seat 6	Dem
Pankaj Prakash	Seat 7	Rep
Mimi Theroux	Seat 8	Dem
Melissa Green Kaplan	Seat 9	Dem

== Economy ==
=== Top employers ===
Top employers in Rocky Hill according to the town's 2024 Comprehensive Annual Financial Report

#	Employer	# of Employees
1	Town of Rocky Hill	534
2	SYSCO Food Services	500
3	Henkel Corporation	490
4	State Veterans Home and Hospital	422
5	Liberty Mutual	315
6	AECOM Technical Services	305
7	Burris Logistics	300
8	Walmart	200
9	Meredith Corporation	200
10	Sheraton Hotel	180

== Points of interest ==
- The Rocky Hill-Glastonbury Ferry to Glastonbury, which is purported to be the nation's oldest continuously running ferry service (though it closes every winter due to ice)
- Dinosaur State Park, which displays fossilized dinosaur footprints discovered in Rocky Hill in the 1960s
- Quarry Park, an 84.3-acre (34.1 ha) park on a former trap rock quarry in northeast Rocky Hill that originally was in operation from the 1920s to the 1950s
- The Connecticut Library for the Blind and Physically Handicapped
- The State Veteran's Home and Hospital, located in Rocky Hill since 1940
- Academy Hall, a museum run by the Rocky Hill Historical Society
- The John Robbins House
- Elm Street Historic District
- Center Cemetery
- Henkel Corporation's U.S. Headquarters for Adhesive Technologies and R&D
- The former headquarters of the Connecticut Lottery
- The studios of CBS-affiliated television station WFSB Channel 3
