= Lyman Memorial High School =

Location
- 917 Exeter Road; Lebanon, Connecticut 06249; United States; 41°37′21″N 72°14′21″W

Information
- Type: Public school
- Established: 1992 (34 years ago)
- Superintendent: Andrew Gonzalez
- CEEB code: 070340
- Principal: James Apicelli
- Teaching staff: 35.30 (FTE)
- Grades: 9-12
- Enrollment: 340 (2023-2024)
- Student to teacher ratio: 9.63
- Athletics conference: Eastern Connecticut Conference
- Team name: Bulldogs
- Website: www.lebanonct.org/o/lmhs/

Lyman Memorial High School is an American high school in Lebanon, Connecticut. It has a very large agricultural program that, with its computer science classes, attracts students from neighboring communities, especially Columbia and Hampton. The school has approximately 330 students with about 70-90 students in each grade.

== History ==
Lyman Memorial was originally built on the Lebanon Green (at the site where the Lebanon Town Hall now sits) and was funded by a generous donation from the Lyman family. The original Lyman building burned down, and the school was re-built on Route 207. This second building became Lebanon Middle School after the present-day Lyman Memorial building was built in the mid-1990s.

The Principal is James Apicelli and the Vice Principal is Samantha Singleton. The current building was completed in 1992.

== Extracurricular activities ==
Lyman's sports teams are nicknamed the Bulldogs, and Lyman historically has very strong soccer and cross country teams. Other athletic programs include basketball, indoor track, wrestling, baseball, softball, volleyball, track and field, tennis, a co-op ice hockey team with Bolton High School, Rockville High School, and Coventry High School, and a co-op football team with Coventry, Windham Tech, and Bolton which went 10–0 in 2017 and won the Pequot League Championship.

== Accreditation ==
Lyman Memorial High School is accredited by the New England Association of Schools and Colleges, Inc., a nongovernmental, nationally recognized organization whose affiliated institutions include elementary schools through collegiate institutions offering post-graduate instruction.
