= Hop River State Park Trail =

Recreation rail trail in Connecticut, United States

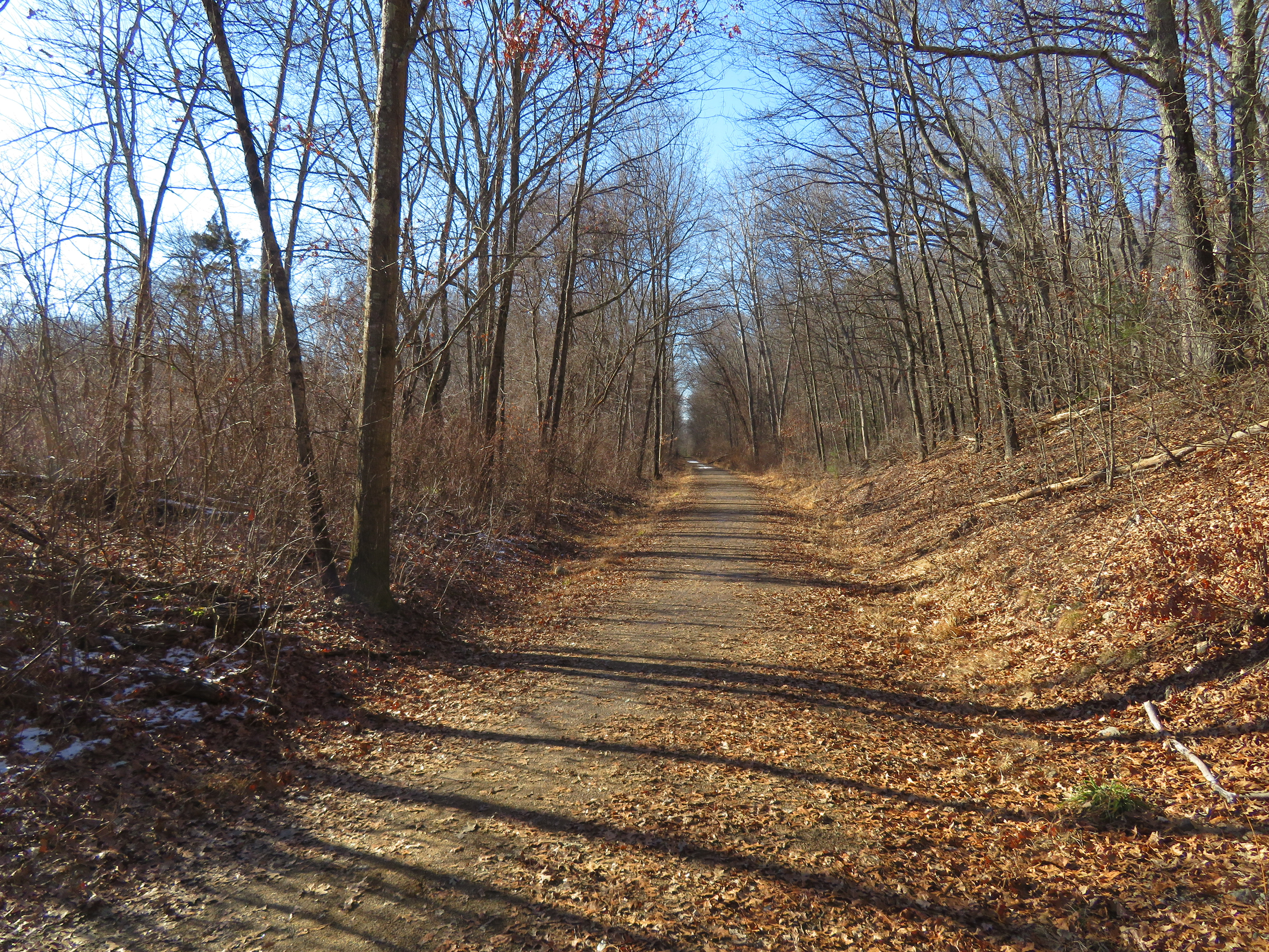
- Hop River State Park Trail in Coventry in 2018
- Length: 20.8 miles (33.5 km)
- Location: Eastern Connecticut
- Designation: Connecticut state park
- Trailheads: Manchester (41°48′02″N 72°30′28″W); Windham (41°42′48″N 72°14′18″W)
- Use: Hiking, biking, horseback riding
- Sights: Hop River
- Maintained by: Connecticut Department of Energy and Environmental Protection
- Website: Hop River State Park Trail

Hop River State Park Trail is a Connecticut rail trail that winds for 20.8 miles (33.5 km) eastward from Colonial Drive in the town of Manchester to the Air Line State Park Trail S. in the town of Windham. The trail parallels the Hop River for much of its length. It is owned and operated by the Connecticut Department of Energy and Environmental Protection, with upgrades and maintenance done by town forces and community volunteer groups in coordination with the state. The trail is used for hiking, biking, horseback riding, and cross-country skiing.

== History ==
The trail was originally part of the Hartford, Providence and Fishkill line from Hartford to Willimantic which was completed in 1849. Freight trains used the line through the 1960s. The last train ran on September 29, 1970, by which time the line was part of the bankrupt Penn Central. The Willimantic section of the trail was built in 2015, unlike the rest of the trail.

== Route ==
Though open to the public for its entire length, different sections of the trail are in different stages of development. Some sections are complete and have a finished, stone-dust surface and signage. Other sections have been cleared and had drainage work done, but still have a somewhat rough, unfinished surface that is not suitable for road bikes.

The following is a section by section description of the trail's current conditions, as of July 2014.

Colonial Road, Manchester to the western Hop River bridge at Columbia/Coventry town line This long section of the trail, including the entire section of trail in the towns of Manchester, Vernon, Bolton and Andover has been completed. Drainage has been improved, signage installed, bridges built, parking lots built, and solid stone-dust surface installed. This is the best section of the trail to be completed so far and has long sections through parklands with no crossroads. The East Coast Greenway (ECG) section is from Bolton Notch East.

Western Hop River bridge at Columbia/Coventry town line to Kings Road, Coventry: This section has been cleared and had drainage improvements, and has some finished surface installed. It is suitable for mountain bikes and horses, but a bit rough for street bikes.

Kings Road, Coventry to Flanders River Road, Columbia: This section of trail is not passable due to a bridge over the Hop River that has not been renovated for trail use. The existing rail bridge is not safe to cross. 0.83 miles of trail improvement, a new bridge and a box culvert under Flanders River Road are part of a $4 million improvement (Consultant/Project - BL/DOT 30-97). Trail traffic can currently follow a short detour around this by following Kings Road to Flanders River Road and rejoining the trail after crossing the river on the road bridge.

Flanders River Road, Columbia to Willimantic River: This section is open, but the trail has not been completely improved -but trail improvements will be under the project noted above. The bridge over the Willimantic has been improved and there is trail head parking next to Mackey’s. A paved trail from Macky’s parking goes under Rte 66 towards the Railroad museum and links to the Airline Trail.

Route 66, Windham/Columbia to Airline State Park Trail, Windham/Lebanon: This section opened in 2015, and the whole section is paved, and is on steep hill, on the eastern end This does not follow the original rail. It starts at the Windham side of the Willimantic River, immediately goes right under the Route 66 bridge Willimantic River and right on the border with Columbia, then follows the Willimantic River throughout the rest of the trail. The trail ends at the Airline Trail South in Willimantic. Turning right will bring you over the Willimantic River into Lebanon. To the original end of the railroad, turn left and continue to CT 32.

== Access points ==
The trail crosses the following roads, providing access:

County	Town	Name	Info	Coordinates
Hartford	Manchester	Colonial Drive	parking area	
Tolland	Vernon	Taylor Street		
Tolland	Vernon	Elm Hill Road		
Tolland	Vernon	Dobson Road		
Tolland	Vernon	Church Street/Phoenix Street	parking area	
Tolland	Vernon	Tunnel Road (SSR 533)		
Tolland	Bolton	Bolton Notch State Park near US 44/ US 6 and I-384	parking area, start of the Charter Oak Greenway	
Tolland	Bolton	Notch Road	underpass	
Tolland	Bolton	Steeles Crossing Road	parking area	
Tolland	Andover	Bailey Road		
Tolland	Andover	Burnap Brook Road	parking area	
Tolland	Andover	Wales Road	parking area	
Tolland	Andover	Shoddy Mill Road	parking area	
Tolland	Andover	Route 316	overpass, access/parking at Andover History Museum	
Tolland	Andover	Merritt Valley Road	overpass	
Tolland	Andover	Lake Road	parking area	
Tolland	Andover	US 6	underpass	
Tolland	Andover	Parker Bridge Road		
Tolland	Columbia	Hop River	river crossing twice in a row	
Tolland	Columbia	Hop River Road	parking area	
Tolland	Coventry	Pucker Street	underpass	
Tolland	Coventry	Willimantic Bypass ( US 6)	underpass	
Tolland	Coventry	Kings Road	overlap	
Tolland	Columbia	Flanders River Road	overlap	
Tolland	Columbia	Old Route 66 rest area		
Tolland	Columbia	Route 66	overlap to Windham	
Windham	Windham	Route 66	parking at a local store	
Windham	Windham	Airline State Park Trail South	Terminus	

== Features ==
A stream restoration project with signage is located about 4 miles (6.4 km) from the Vernon trailhead. It is just north of where the trail goes under U.S. Route 44 at Bolton Notch in Bolton Notch State Park.

== Development ==
The eastern half of the trail at Bolton Notch State Park connects to the Charter Oak Greenway going west towards Manchester and Hartford. The eastern terminus of the trail connects to the Air Line State Park Trail near the CT Eastern Railroad Museum. The Charter Oak Greenway, Air Line State Park Trail, and the Hop River State Park Trail will be pieces of the East Coast Greenway (ECG), a trail linking major cities from Maine to Florida. The ECG in Connecticut runs from Rhode Island across to Hartford, down to New Haven and over to New York.
