= Memorial High School =

Memorial High School may refer to:

== United States ==
=== As Memorial High School alone ===
- Memorial High School (Millville, New Jersey)
- Memorial High School (West New York, New Jersey)
- Memorial High School (St. Marys, Ohio)
- Memorial High School (Tulsa, Oklahoma)
- Memorial High School (Hedwig Village, Texas), with a Houston mailing address
- Memorial High School (Port Arthur, Texas)
- Memorial High School (Victoria, Texas)
- Memorial High School (Eau Claire, Wisconsin)
- Memorial High School (Frisco, Texas)

=== With Memorial High School in the name ===
- Amityville Memorial High School — Amityville, New York
- Arlington Memorial School — Arlington, Vermont
- Ballard Memorial High School — Barlow, Kentucky
- Beloit Memorial High School — Beloit, Wisconsin
- Billerica Memorial High School — Billerica, Massachusetts
- Bishop Amat Memorial High School — La Puente, California
- Brick Township Memorial High School — Brick, New Jersey
- Campbell Memorial High School (Ohio) — Campbell, Ohio
- Catholic Memorial High School — Waukesha, Wisconsin
- Cimarron-Memorial High School — North Las Vegas, Nevada
- Civic Memorial High School — Bethalto, Illinois
- Doherty Memorial High School — Worcester, Massachusetts
- Edmond Memorial High School — Edmond, Oklahoma
- Elkhart Memorial High School — Elkhart, Indiana
- Ellender Memorial High School — Houma, Louisiana
- Elmont Memorial High School — Elmont, New York
- Elmwood Park Memorial High School — Elmwood Park, New Jersey
- Ely Memorial High School — Ely, Minnesota
- Floral Park Memorial High School — Floral Park, New York
- Florence Township Memorial High School; Florence, New Jersey
- Frenship Memorial High School — Lubbock, Texas. Set to open August 2025
- G. A. R. Memorial Junior Senior High School — Wilkes-Barre, Pennsylvania
- Garces Memorial High School — Bakersfield, California
- Granby Memorial High School — Granby, Connecticut
- Haddonfield Memorial High School — Haddonfield, New Jersey
- Jackson Memorial High School — Jackson, New Jersey
- John Bapst Memorial High School — Bangor, Maine
- John F. Kennedy Memorial High School (Mississippi) — Mound Bayou, Mississippi
- John F. Kennedy Memorial High School (New Jersey) — Iselin, New Jersey
- Judge Memorial Catholic High School — Salt Lake City, Utah
- Kellenberg Memorial High School — Uniondale, New York
- Lloyd Memorial High School — Erlanger, Kentucky
- Lyman Memorial High School — Lebanon, Connecticut
- Machias Memorial High School — Machias, Maine
- Manchester Memorial High School — Manchester, New Hampshire
- McAllen Memorial High School — McAllen, Texas
- Monsignor McClancy Memorial High School — Elmhurst, New York
- New Hyde Park Memorial High School — New Hyde Park, New York
- Newark Memorial High School — Newark, California
- Pasadena Memorial High School — Pasadena, Texas
- Peabody Veterans Memorial High School — Peabody, Massachusetts
- Pelham Memorial High School — Pelham, New York
- Pennsville Memorial High School — Pennsville, New Jersey
- Pharr-San Juan-Alamo Memorial High School — Alamo, Texas
- Picayune Memorial High School — Picayune, Mississippi
- Reading Memorial High School — Reading, Massachusetts
- Reitz Memorial High School — Evansville, Indiana
- Rice Memorial High School — South Burlington, Vermont
- Ridgefield Memorial High School — Ridgefield, New Jersey
- San Joaquin Memorial High School — Fresno, California
- Sayreville War Memorial High School — Sayreville, New Jersey
- Scecina Memorial High School — Indianapolis, Indiana
- Seeger Memorial Junior-Senior High School — West Lebanon, Indiana
- Tewksbury Memorial High School — Tewksbury, Massachusetts
- Tourtellotte Memorial High School — Grosvenordale, Connecticut
- Vel Phillips Memorial High School — Madison, Wisconsin, widely known as "Memorial High School"
- Waldo J. Wood Memorial Jr/Sr High School — Oakland City, Indiana
- Watkins Memorial High School — Pataskala, Ohio
- Wilson Memorial High School — Fishersville, Virginia

== Australia ==
- Farrer Memorial Agricultural High School — Tamworth, New South Wales

== Canada ==
- Banting Memorial High School — Alliston, Ontario
- James M. Hill Memorial High School — Miramichi, New Brunswick
- Memorial Composite High School — Stony Plain, Alberta
- Yarmouth Consolidated Memorial High School — Yarmouth, Nova Scotia
- École John Stubbs Memorial School — Colwood, British Columbia

== India ==
- A. J. John Memorial High School — Kavilumpara, Kerala
- Dr. S. Hussain Zaheer Memorial High School — Hyderabad, Andhra Pradesh
- Olcott Memorial High School — Chennai, Tamil Nadu

== Nigeria ==
- Apata Memorial High School — Lagos

== See also ==
- Catholic Memorial School — Boston, Massachusetts
- Veterans Memorial High School — a list of schools
