= North Central Connecticut Conference =

- Conference: CIAC
- Founded: 1962
- No. of teams: 12
- Region: Hartford County; Tolland County
- Official website: 79188.digitalsports.com

The North Central Connecticut Conference is a high school league, and is a part of the Connecticut Interscholastic Athletic Conference.

== History ==
In July 1999 Enfield High school a founding member of the CCC Conference in 1984, applied to join the NCCC conference. In 2016 Enfield would leave the NCCC conference and rejoin the CCC Conference as a result of its merger with Enrico Fermi High School. Also in 1999 E.O. Smith High school would join the CCC due to increasing enrollment. In 2015 ECC schools, Griswold, Plainfield, Killingly, Windham, Woodstock Academy, Lyman Memorial in Lebanon and Tourtellotte applied to join the NCCC conference.

== Member schools ==
School	Location	Nickname	Colors
Bolton High School	Bolton, Connecticut	Bulldogs	
Canton High School	Canton, Connecticut	Warriors	
Coventry High School	Coventry, Connecticut	Patriots	
East Granby High School	East Granby, Connecticut	Crusaders	
East Windsor High School	East Windsor, Connecticut	Panthers	
Ellington High School	Ellington, Connecticut	Knights	
Granby Memorial High School	Granby, Connecticut	Bears	
Rockville High School	Vernon, Connecticut	Rams	
Somers High School	Somers, Connecticut	Spartans	
Stafford High School	Stafford, Connecticut	Bulldogs	
Suffield High School	West Suffield, Connecticut	Wildcats	
Windsor Locks High School	Windsor Locks, Connecticut	Raiders	

=== Former members ===
School	Location	Nickname	Colors	Current conference
Avon High School	Avon, Connecticut	Falcons		Central Connecticut Conference
Classical Magnet School	Hartford, Connecticut	Gladiators		Greater Hartford Conference
Enfield High School	Enfield, Connecticut	Eagles		Central Connecticut Conference
E. O. Smith High School	Storrs, Connecticut	Panthers		Central Connecticut Conference
Hartford Magnet Trinity College Academy	Hartford, Connecticut	Phoenix		Greater Hartford Conference
Rocky Hill High School	Rocky Hill, Connecticut	Terriers		Central Connecticut Conference
Sport and Medical Sciences Academy	Hartford, Connecticut	Tigers		Greater Hartford Conference
Tolland High School	Tolland, Connecticut	Eagles		Central Connecticut Conference
