= Coventry High School =

Coventry High School can refer to:

- Coventry High School (Coventry, Connecticut)
- Coventry High School (Coventry Township, Ohio)
- Coventry High School (Rhode Island)
