= Granby Memorial High School =

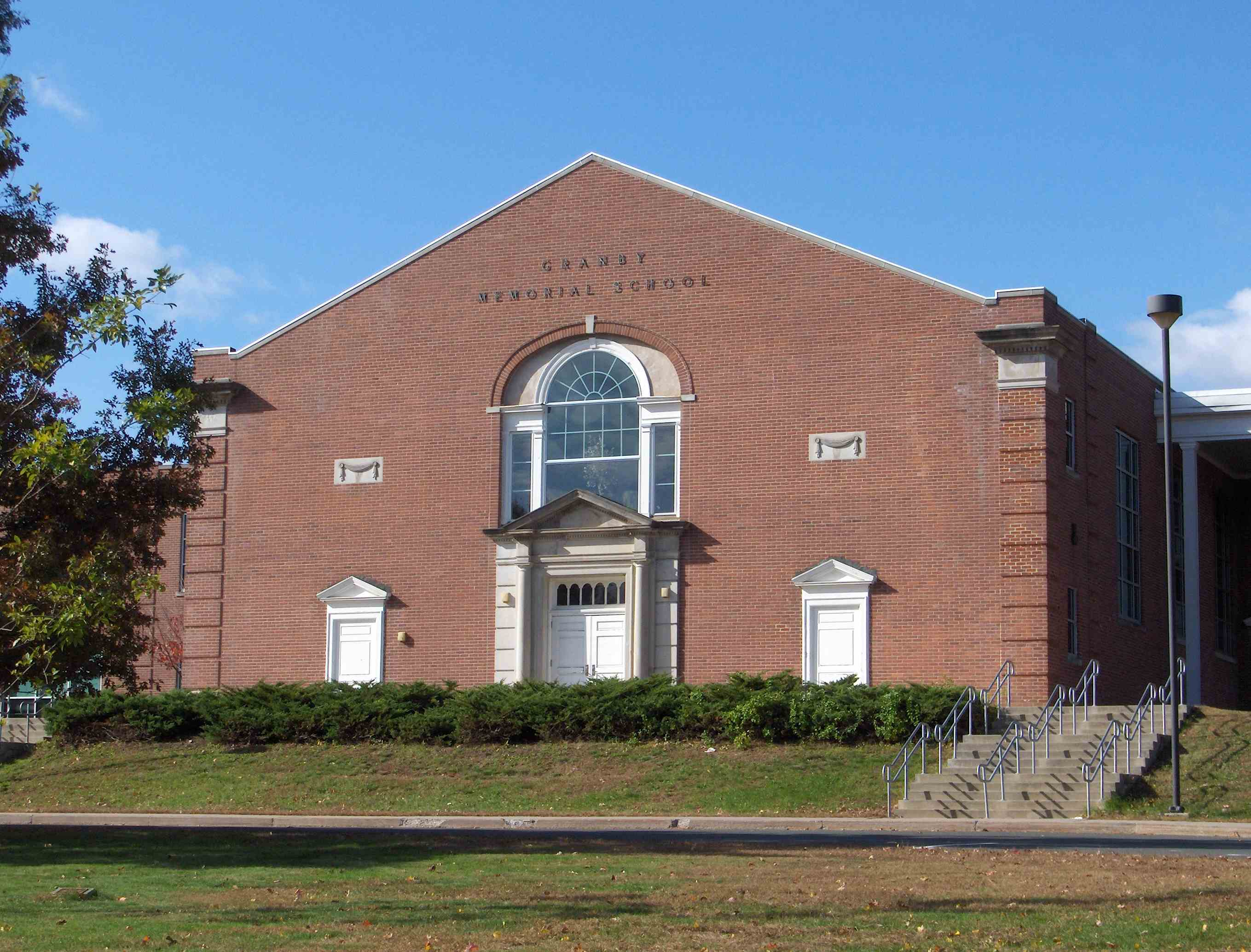

Location
- 315 Salmon Brook Street; Granby, Connecticut 06035; United States; 41°57′35″N 72°47′31″W

Information
- Founded: 1957 (69 years ago)
- School district: Granby Public Schools
- CEEB code: 070217
- Principal: Mike Dunn
- Teaching staff: 51.10 (on an FTE basis)
- Grades: 9-12
- Enrollment: 653 (2023-2024)
- Average class size: 24 Students
- Student to teacher ratio: 11.02
- Colours: Maroon and gold
- Athletics conference: North Central Connecticut Conference
- Mascot: Bear
- Rival: East Granby High School, Avon High School (Connecticut), Canton High School (Connecticut), Suffield High School (Connecticut)
- Website: www.granby.k12.ct.us/o/gmhs

Granby Memorial High School is a public high school in Granby, Connecticut. It was founded in 1957 to accommodate the town's growing population. The school is commonly known as "Home of the Bears" and is a member of the NCCC Athletic Conference, where its athletic teams have won a number of championships. The high school's current principal is Mike Dunn. Cheri P. Burke, is currently the district's superintendent. The school is located less than one half mile north of the center of Granby on Route 10 and 202.

== Academic achievements ==
The school was recognized in 2006 as a Connecticut Vanguard School as a result of its excellent academic performance on the Connecticut Academic Performance Test and other criteria.

In 2008 Connecticut Magazine ranked Granby Memorial High School 14th out of public 125 Connecticut schools. The rankings were mainly based on the schools' student academic performance.

For 2010, based on 2007/2008 statistics, GMHS was ranked #4 in Top Schools for Hartford County by Hartford Magazine.

== Athletics ==
=== Fall ===
- Cross Country (Boys & Girls)
- Field Hockey (Girls)
- Football (Boys & Girls)
- Soccer (Boys & Girls)
- Volleyball (Girls)

=== Winter ===
- Basketball (Boys & Girls)
- Ice Hockey (Boys)
- Wrestling (Boys & Girls)
- Swimming (Boys & Girls)
- Indoor Track (Boys & Girls)
- Cheerleading (Boys & Girls)

=== Spring ===
- Baseball (Boys)
- Softball (Girls)
- Golf (Boys & Girls)
- Tennis (Boys & Girls)
- Lacrosse (Boys & Girls)
- Track (Boys & Girls)
- Ultimate Frisbee (Boys & Girls) Qualified for states both of the first two years the program was running

=== CIAC State Championships ===
Team	Year
Field Hockey	1973, 1974, 1978, 1980, 1982, 1985, 2000, 2003, 2004, 2007, 2009, 2010, 2011, 2019
Boys Soccer	1978, 1984, 1985, 1986, 1987, 1989, 1991, 1993, 2000, 2001, 2005
Girls Soccer	1986, 1987, 1988, 2000, 2001, 2017, 2019
Boys Tennis	1979, 1980, 2021, 2022
Girls Cross Country	1974, 1975, 2009
Girls Lacrosse	2015
Boys Basketball	2013
Girls Volleyball	2014
Boys Outdoor Track	1984
Baseball	1982

=== Clubs and organizations ===
GMHS offers a variety of clubs and organizations: AFS Club, Artemis Club, Best Buddies International, Chamber Singers, Chess Club, Computer Club, Connecticut Youth Forum, Debate Society, Drama Club, Environmental Club, French Exchange, French Honor Society, Horticulture Club, Leo Club, Math League, National Honor Society, Peer Mediators, Poetry Club, Robotics Club, SAFE (GSA), Spanish Honor Society, DECA Club, Student Government, Weightlifting Club, and Young Educators Society (YES).

The robotics club in Granby is a FIRST Robotics Competition (FRC) team, team 3146. While not a sport, the club is considered a varsity team.
