= Bolton Notch State Park =

State park in Tolland County, Connecticut

- Saqumsketuck
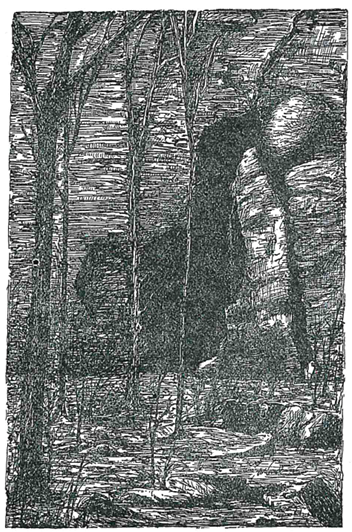
- Drawing of Squaw's Cave of Bolton Notch State Park from the book The Story of Wunnee-Neetunah, or The Life of an Indian Princess of Connecticut by Mathia Spiess c. 1934

- Location within Connecticut Location within the United States
- Interactive map of Bolton Notch State Park
- Type: Protected area
- Location: Bolton, Connecticut, United States
- Nearest city: Hartford, Connecticut
- Nearest town: Manchester, Connecticut
- Coordinates: 41°47′20″N 72°27′11″W
- Area: 95
- Elevation: 568 ft (173 m)
- Established: 1918
- Etymology: A land or place of hard rock (Saqumsketuck)
- Administrator: Connecticut Department of Energy and Environmental Protection
- Open: Dusk to dawn
- Status: Open all year
- Hiking trails: Garnett Trail; Hop River Trail; Shenipsit Trail
- Terrain: Forested
- Water: Salmon River
- Designation: Connecticut state park
- Parking: Free
- Website: Official website

Bolton Notch State Park is a public, protected recreation area located at the junction of U.S. Route 44 and U.S. Route 6 in the town of Bolton, Connecticut. The site forms part of the boundary between the Thames River and Connecticut River watersheds. The state park's 95 acres (38 ha) offer opportunities for hiking, climbing, and cave exploration.

== History ==
=== Pre-human ===
Some 25,000 years ago all of New England, including Connecticut, was covered by the massive Laurentide Ice Sheet. Climate change forced the sheet of ice to start receding, with the last of the glacial ice disappearing from Connecticut by 10,000 years ago.

Large sand dunes accumulated in this glacial period as winds picked up outwash sand forming river valleys. As the climate warmed, the modern stream and river network was soon established, such as the Connecticut River. The formation of Bolton Notch consists of schist, quartzite and gneiss, as well as the minerals biotite, muscovite, quartz, garnet and staurolite

=== Indigenous peoples ===
Native Americans are believed to have used the major trails crossing through Bolton Notch, which they called Saqumsketuck, for at least 10,000 years. The notch is thought to have created the boundary between the Mohegan and Podunk territories.

==== Folklore ====
The park grounds include Squaw's Cave, where according to legend, a Dutch cabin boy by the name of Peter Hager and his Podunk bride, Wunnee-Neetunah (US: /ˈwʌn.niːtunə/One Nee-TUNA) lived as outcasts around the year 1640. Hager came to the New World on a ship captained by Adriaen Block, the Onrust.

=== Modern History ===
Prior to becoming a protected state park, the area was used for a railroad from the 1850s through the 1950s. The railroad carried both passengers and freight. A crucial use for the railroad was transporting rock from the historic Bolton Notch quarry, located east of the park.

The state purchased the park's first 70 acres in 1918 in anticipation of developing a Wayside Park.

== Activities and amenities ==
The park offers rock climbing and hiking as well as "several caves large enough to accommodate a human." It is crossed by both the Hop River Trail and Shenipsit Trail.
