= Hop River =

River in Connecticut, United States

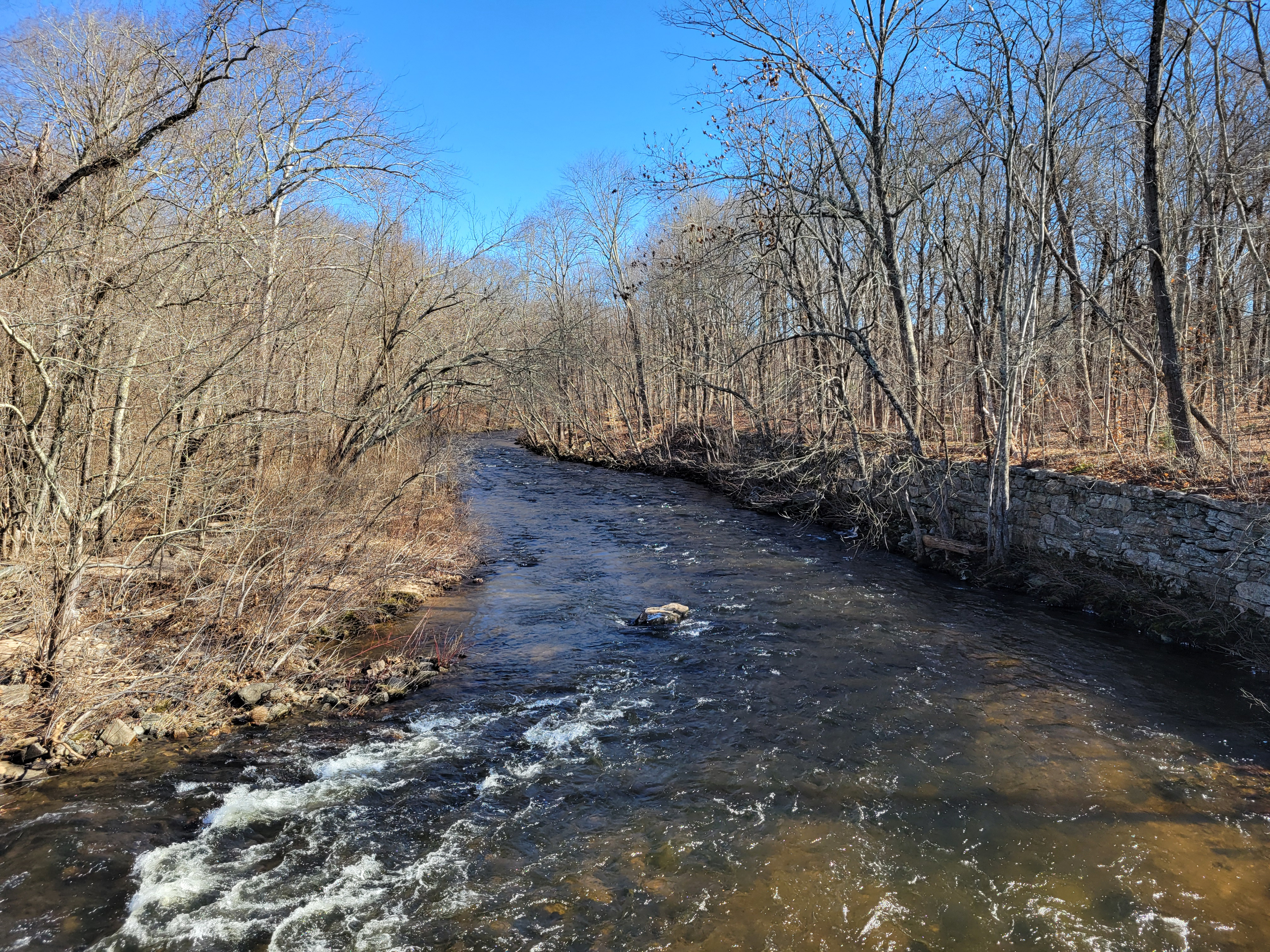
- At Hop River Road in Coventry

Location
- Country: United States
- State: Connecticut
- Counties: Tolland

Physical characteristics
- Source: Unnamed marsh
  - location: Bolton, Tolland County, Connecticut, United States
  - coordinates: 41°47′18″N 72°26′06″W
- Mouth: Willimantic River
  - location: Columbia, Tolland County, Connecticut, United States
  - coordinates: 41°43′23″N 72°15′00″W

The Hop River is a river that runs through Tolland County, Connecticut. The Hop River's marshy source is just southeast of Bolton Notch, Connecticut. It flows for about 15.0 miles (24.1 km) to its confluence with the Willimantic River. There is a popular paddling route beginning where the Skungamaug River enters the Hop River just north of the Hendee Road bridge and ending at the Willimantic River. Most of this route consists of quick-water, but a few Class I and Class II whitewater areas exist.

The Hop River State Park Trail crosses the river twice and is parallel to the river for the majority of the river's length.

== Crossings ==
County	Town	Carrying
Tolland	Bolton	US 6 (twice in a row)
Tolland	Coventry	South Street
Tolland	Andover	Times Farm Road
Tolland	Andover	Hendee Road
Tolland	Andover	Long Hill Road
Tolland	Andover	Bunker Hill Road
Tolland	Coventry	Parker Bridge Road
Tolland	Columbia	Hop River State Park Trail (twice in a row)
Tolland	Columbia	Hop River Road
Tolland	Columbia	Pucker Road
Tolland	Columbia	US 6 (Willimantic Bypass)
Tolland	Columbia	Abandoned Railroad Bridge
Tolland	Columbia	Flanders Road

== See also ==
- List of rivers of Connecticut
