= Bolton High School =

Bolton High School is the name of several schools:

- Bolton High School (Connecticut) in Bolton, Connecticut
- Bolton High School (Louisiana) in Alexandria, Louisiana
- Bolton High School (Tennessee) in Arlington, Tennessee
