= Somers High School =

Somers High School may refer to:

- Somers High School (Connecticut) in Somers, Connecticut
- Somers High School (New York) in Somers, New York
