= LMHS =

LMHS may refer to:

- Linda Marquez High School, Huntington Park, California, United States
- La Marque High School, La Marque, Texas (Greater Houston)
- La Mirada High School, La Mirada, California
- Lake Marion High School & Technology Center, Santee, South Carolina, United States
- Lake Mary High School, Lake Mary, Florida, United States
- Lake Minneola High School, Minneola, Florida, United States
- Laurier Macdonald High School, Montreal, Quebec, Canada
- Linden-McKinley High School, Columbus, Ohio, United States
- Linn-Mar High School, Marion, Iowa, United States
- Little Miami High School, Morrow, Ohio, United States
- Lloyd Memorial High School, Erlanger, Kentucky, United States
- Louisville Male High School, Louisville, Kentucky, United States
- Lower Merion High School, Ardmore, Pennsylvania, United States
- Lyman Memorial High School, Lebanon, Connecticut, United States
