= Canton High School =

Canton High School may refer to:

- Canton High School (Cardiff), now Cantonian High School
- Canton High School (Connecticut)
- Canton High School (Massachusetts)
- Canton High School (Illinois)
- Canton High School (Mississippi), a Mississippi Landmark
- Plymouth-Canton Educational Park in Michigan
- Hugh C. Williams Senior High School in Canton, New York
- Canton High School (Texas), in Canton, Texas
- Canton South High School, in Canton, Ohio
