= 1908 Connecticut Aggies football team =

American college football season

1908 Connecticut Aggies football
- Conference: Athletic League of New England State Colleges
- Record: 4–3–1 (0–1 New England)
- Head coach: William F. Madden (1st season)
- Home stadium: Athletic Fields

The 1908 Connecticut Aggies football team represented Connecticut Agricultural College, now the University of Connecticut, in the 1908 college football season. The Aggies were led by first-year head coach William F. Madden, and completed the season with a record of 4–3–1.

== Schedule ==
Date	Opponent	Site	Result	Source
September 26	Rockville High School*	Athletic Fields; Storrs, CT	W 36–0	
October 10	at Springfield Training School*	Springfield, MA	L 0–21	
October 17	at Worcester Academy*	Worcester, MA	L 0–16	
October 24	at Cushing Academy*	Ashburnham, MA	W 16–0	
October 31	Wesleyan*	Athletic Fields; Storrs, CT	W 65–0	
November 7	Boston College*	Athletic Fields; Storrs, CT	T 0–0	
November 14	Wilbraham Wesleyan Academy*	Athletic Fields; Storrs, CT	W 23–0	
November 21	Rhode Island State	Athletic Fields; Storrs, CT (rivalry)	L 10–12	
*Non-conference game
