= Stafford High School =

Stafford High School may refer to:

- Stafford High School (Stafford, Connecticut), a school in Stafford, Connecticut
- Stafford Senior High School, a school in Stafford County, Virginia
- Stafford High School, a school in the Stafford Municipal School District near Houston, Texas
