= Bolton Green Historic District =

Historic district in Connecticut, United States

- U.S. National Register of Historic Places
- U.S. Historic district
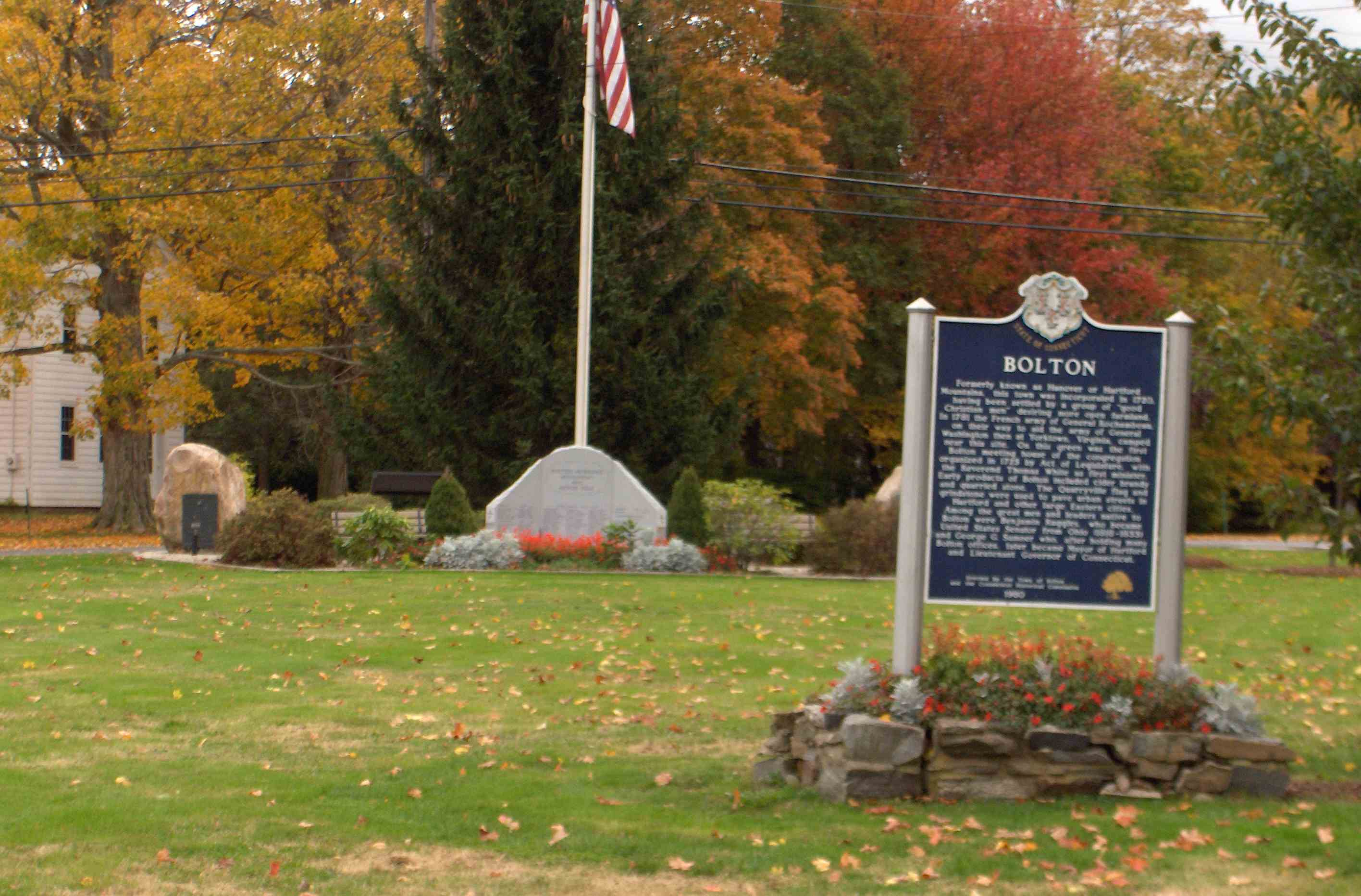

- Location within Connecticut Location within the United States
- Location: Roughly the Green, 219,220,222,228,233,266 Bolton Center Road and 3 Hebron Road, Bolton, Connecticut
- Coordinates: 41°46′20″N 72°25′42″W
- Architect: Knox, Malcom Robinson
- Architectural style: Colonial, Federal, et al.
- NRHP reference No.: 01000357
- Added to NRHP: April 12, 2001

Bolton Green Historic District is a historic district that includes the town green, Bolton Green, of the town of Bolton, Connecticut. The green and the surrounding buildings were listed on the National Register of Historic Places in 2001. The district encompasses 9 buildings, 1 site, 4 structures, and 2 objects that contribute to the historical significance of the area. The district extends east about 500 yards (460 m) from the green along Bolton Center Road. The oldest existing buildings around the Green are the former tavern and the Bolton General Store. The most prominent building around the Green is the Bolton Congregational Church, a Greek Revival structure built in 1818 with a truncated box-spire. Other structures around the green are a house facing the green on the east side built in the 1840s, and a new ranch house that was built on the former site of an 1870s house that was destroyed by fire. Other properties in the district includes the Brick Tavern, the site of Bolton's first post office, the town hall, the Tuthill residence, and the Bolton Heritage Farm.

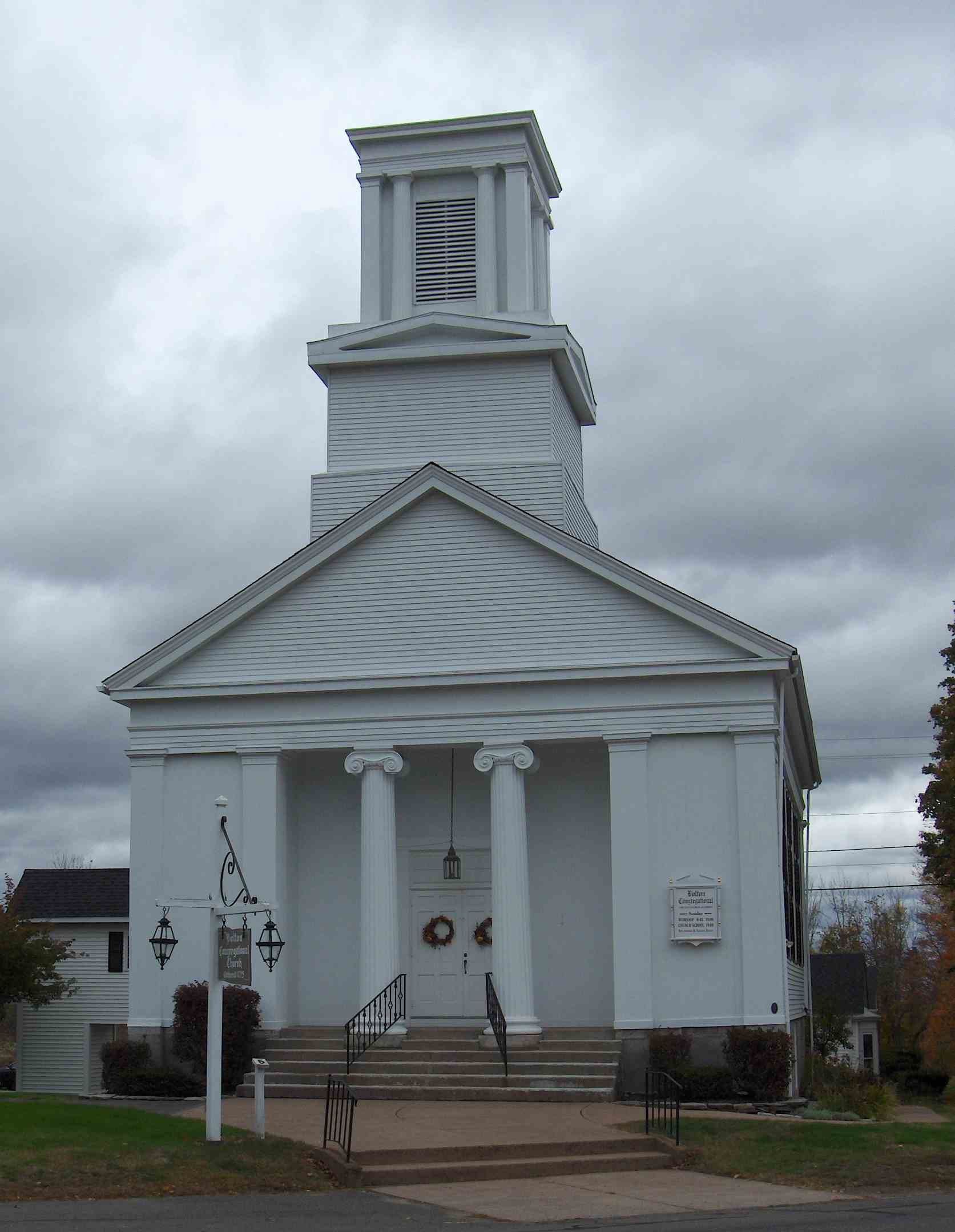
Congregational Church on Bolton Green

The green itself is triangular in shape and is located at the junction of Bolton Center Road and Hebron Road. The Green is an open, well-kept grassy area defined by the roads and trees. The green contains two war memorials commemorating World War I and World War II; and Korea and Vietnam combined, flanking a flagpole. Bolton Green continues to be used as an open space maintained for public use and town commemorative functions.

The Washington-Rochambeau Revolutionary Route National Historic Trail passes through the Bolton Green historic district.

== See also ==
- National Register of Historic Places listings in Tolland County, Connecticut
