= Veterans Memorial High School =

Veterans Memorial High School is the name of several high schools in the United States.

- Veterans Memorial High School (Brownsville, Texas), a public high school in the Brownsville Independent School District
- Veterans Memorial High School (Corpus Christi, Texas), a public high school in the Corpus Christi Independent School District
- Veterans Memorial High School (San Antonio), a public high school in the Judson Independent School District, Texas
- Veterans Memorial High School (Mission, Texas), a public high school in the Mission Independent School District
- Peabody Veterans Memorial High School, a public high school in the Peabody Public School District, Peabody, Massachusetts
- Warwick Veterans Memorial High School, a school in Warwick, Rhode Island

== See also ==
- Memorial High School, a list of schools
