= William J. Shea =

American judge (1900–1965)

William J. Shea (April 4, 1900 – February 5, 1965) was a justice of the Connecticut Supreme Court from 1959 to 1965.

== Early life, education, and political career ==
Born on a farm in Vernon, Connecticut, Shea graduated from that city's Rockville High School and then attended Trinity College, in Hartford, Connecticut, and the Catholic University of America, in Washington, D.C. He received his law degree from Catholic University Law School in 1925. and entered the private practice of law in Manchester, Connecticut. In 1933, Shea was elected as a Republican to the position of Manchester town prosecutor. He was elected to a term in the Connecticut House of Representatives in 1937, and then to the Connecticut Senate in 1939.

== Judicial service ==
In 1940, Governor Robert A. Hurley named Shea to the Connecticut Superior Court, where his docket included the criminal prosecutions following the infamous Hartford circus fire of 1944.

Shea eventually became chief justice of the Connecticut Superior Court, a position he held until 1959, when Governor Abraham Ribicoff elevated Shea to the state supreme court, where Shea served until his death.

== Personal life and death ==
Shea married Frances Spillane in 1930, with whom he had a daughter and two sons.

Shea died in his home in Manchester, following a lengthy illness.

Political offices
| Preceded by Edward J. Daly | Justice of the Connecticut Supreme Court; 1959–1965 | Succeeded by James C. Shannon |
