= Tullock =

Tullock may refer to:

== People ==
- Gordon Tullock (1922–2014), American economist
- Jen Tullock (born 1983), American actress
- Stacey Tullock (born 1978), American soccer player

== Other uses ==
- Tullock Formation, geologic formation in Montana
