= Simoniz =

American cleaning product company

Simoniz USA, Inc.
- Type: Private
- Industry: Commercial and Industrial Cleaning Products
- Founded: 1910 in Chicago, Illinois, United States
- Headquarters: Bolton, Connecticut, U.S.
- Website: www.simoniz.com

Simoniz USA, Inc. is an American manufacturer of automobile and janitorial cleaning products. The original Simoniz Company was founded in 1910.

== History ==
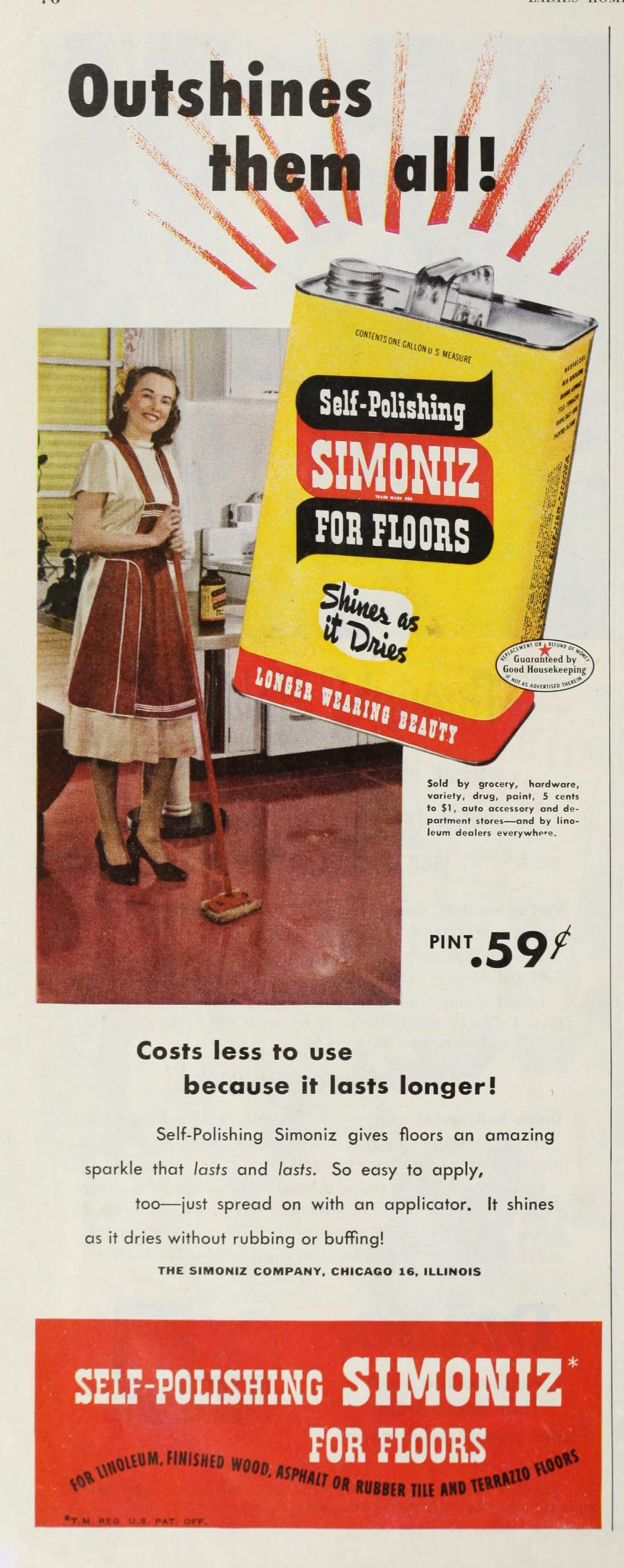
Ad for the floor product from 1949

The Simons Manufacturing Company was founded in 1910 by George Simons, who had developed a cleaner and a carnauba wax product for car finishes, and Elmer Rich of the Great Northern Railway. In 1912, Rich and his brother, R.J., acquired full ownership. They changed the name of the firm to Simoniz Company and located the first office and backroom factory at 2121 South Michigan Avenue in Chicago, which was at the time was known as "Automobile Row". Elmer Rich used the prominence of radio to promote his product with the slogan "Motorists Wise, Simoniz".

An Institutional Division was officially organized in 1954, which offered a line of floor waxes, finishes, polishes, cleaners and sponges formulated and packaged expressly for business and large-volume public users.

Vista One-Step Cleaner/Wax made its debut in 1957.

In 1965 Morton International purchased the controlling interest in Simoniz Company, adding Master Wax-Detergent Proof and Smooth-Pre Softened products to the line.

In 1976, Simoniz was acquired by Union Carbide. It introduced such products as Shines Like the Sun, Super Poly, Body Guard, Double Wax, Simoniz II, Shine Booster and Super Blue.

In 1986, as a part of the divestiture of Union Carbide, a management-led LBO formed First Brands Corp. and Simoniz was among the brands purchased. In 1988, First Brands entered into a license agreement with Syndet Products, Inc. to manufacture and distribute on-line Simoniz brand products nationally to the car wash industry, which eventually expanded to include detail shop and janitorial/sanitation (JanSan) cleaning products.

In 1997, Syndet Products purchased the Simoniz brand from First Brands Corp., and renamed the company Simoniz USA, Inc.

== Trivia ==
The term "Simoniz" or "Simonizing" has entered the public lexicon as a means to wax one's car.
