= Columbia Green Historic District =

Historic district in Connecticut, United States

- U.S. National Register of Historic Places
- U.S. Historic district
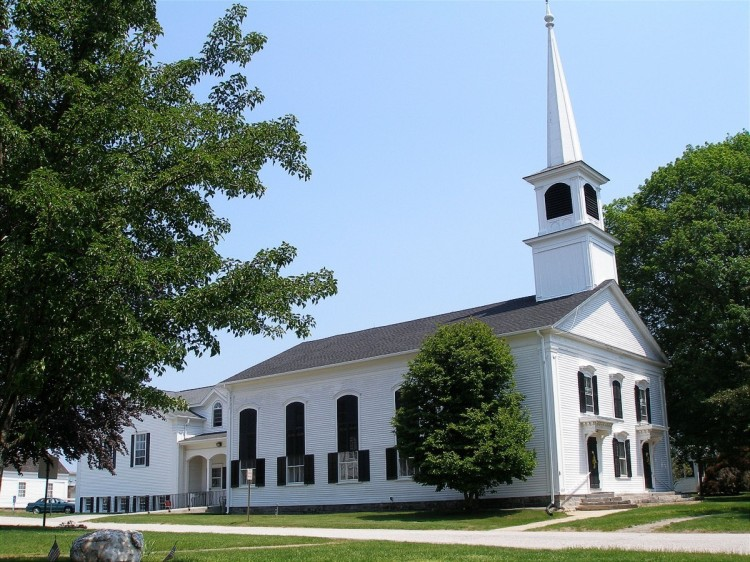
- The Congregational church on the green

- Location within Connecticut Location within the United States
- Location: Along CT 87 at Junction with CT 66, Columbia, Connecticut
- Coordinates: 41°42′5″N 72°18′10″W
- Architect: Little, Wilton E.
- Architectural style: Greek Revival, Colonial, Queen Anne
- NRHP reference No.: 90001759
- Added to NRHP: December 06, 1990

Columbia Green Historic District is a historic district that includes the town green, Columbia Green, of the town of Columbia, Connecticut, United States. The district includes buildings around the green and extending northwest along Route 87. The district was listed on the National Register of Historic Places in 1990. It comprises 43 buildings, 2 sites, and 1 object that contribute to the historical significance of the area.

The Town Hall, the Congregational Church, a former chapel (now a gallery), the parsonage and the former house of Eleazor Wheelock (c. 1736) are located around the Green. A new Victorian Revival gazebo is located in the center of the Green. Near the intersection of Route 66 and Route 87 is the town historical marker and a World War I memorial. This intersection is dominated visually by the modern St. Columbia Catholic Church (1953), a brick building with a tall spire.

Around the green are various civic and religious institutions of the town of Columbia, as well as residences dating from the 18th, 19th and early 20th centuries. Some of the more notable buildings in the area are the Eleazor Wheelock House, the Indian Charity School, the Congregational Church, and the Landmark Inn. The Landmark Inn is where General Rochambeau's officers were accommodated as they scouted the route to be taken by the French troops in their famous march from Newport, Rhode Island, to Yorktown, Virginia, during the Revolutionary War.

== See also ==
- National Register of Historic Places listings in Tolland County, Connecticut
