= William F. Madden (American football) =

American athlete, coach, and military and law enforcement officer (1879–1919)

Biographical details
- Born: May 1879; Manchester, Connecticut, U.S.
- Died: January 30, 1919 (aged 39); Manchester, Connecticut, U.S.

Playing career
- 1904–1907: Trinity
- Position: Halfback

Coaching career (HC unless noted)
- 1908: Connecticut

Head coaching record
- Overall: 4–3–1

William F. Madden (1879–1919) was an American athlete, coach, and military and law enforcement officer who was a multisport athlete at Trinity College, head coach of the Connecticut Agriculture College football team, and an officer in the Connecticut Army National Guard.

== Athletics ==
Madden was born in Manchester, Connecticut, in May 1879. He played halfback for his high school football team and also excelled in track and field, boxing, wrestling, and baseball. He graduated in 1900 and worked for Cheney Brothers for a time before entering Trinity College. He earned sixteen varsity letters at Trinity and was named the school's best athlete all four years he was there. He played running back in football, outfield in baseball, and center in basketball and competed in both running and field events in track.

Madden was head coach of the 1908 Connecticut Aggies football team. The Aggies went 4–3–1 in their only season under Madden.

== Military service ==
Madden joined Company G of the Connecticut Army National Guard while still in high school. The Spanish–American War broke out during his sophomore year and Madden served with this company for the duration of the conflict. He finished the war with the rank of corporal and was later promoted to captain.

== Law enforcement ==
In 1908, Madden helped found the Manchester Police Department. He was captain of the department for four years. In 1915, he became the special patrolman for Cheney Brothers.

On the night of January 30, 1919, Madden received a tip that there would be an attempt to steal silk from the Cheney Brothers stockroom. He and his partner, Clifton B. Macomber, found a group of men in the area and ordered them to leave. As they were starting their car, Madden changed his mind, climbed on the vehicle's running board, and told the driver to go to a nearby fire station so they could talk further. One of the occupants shot at Madden, and Madden and Macomber exchanged gunfire with the would-be robbers. Madden was wounded and died at the scene. The driver, Fred L. Klein of Hoboken, New Jersey was soon apprehended. In the following days, five men were arrested for Madden's murder. All of them were convicted of murder and sentenced to life in prison. In 1925, one of the men, Michael J. McDonnell, escaped from Wethersfield State Prison. He was arrested in Paterson, New Jersey, in 1928 after an attempted armed robbery.
