= East Granby High School =

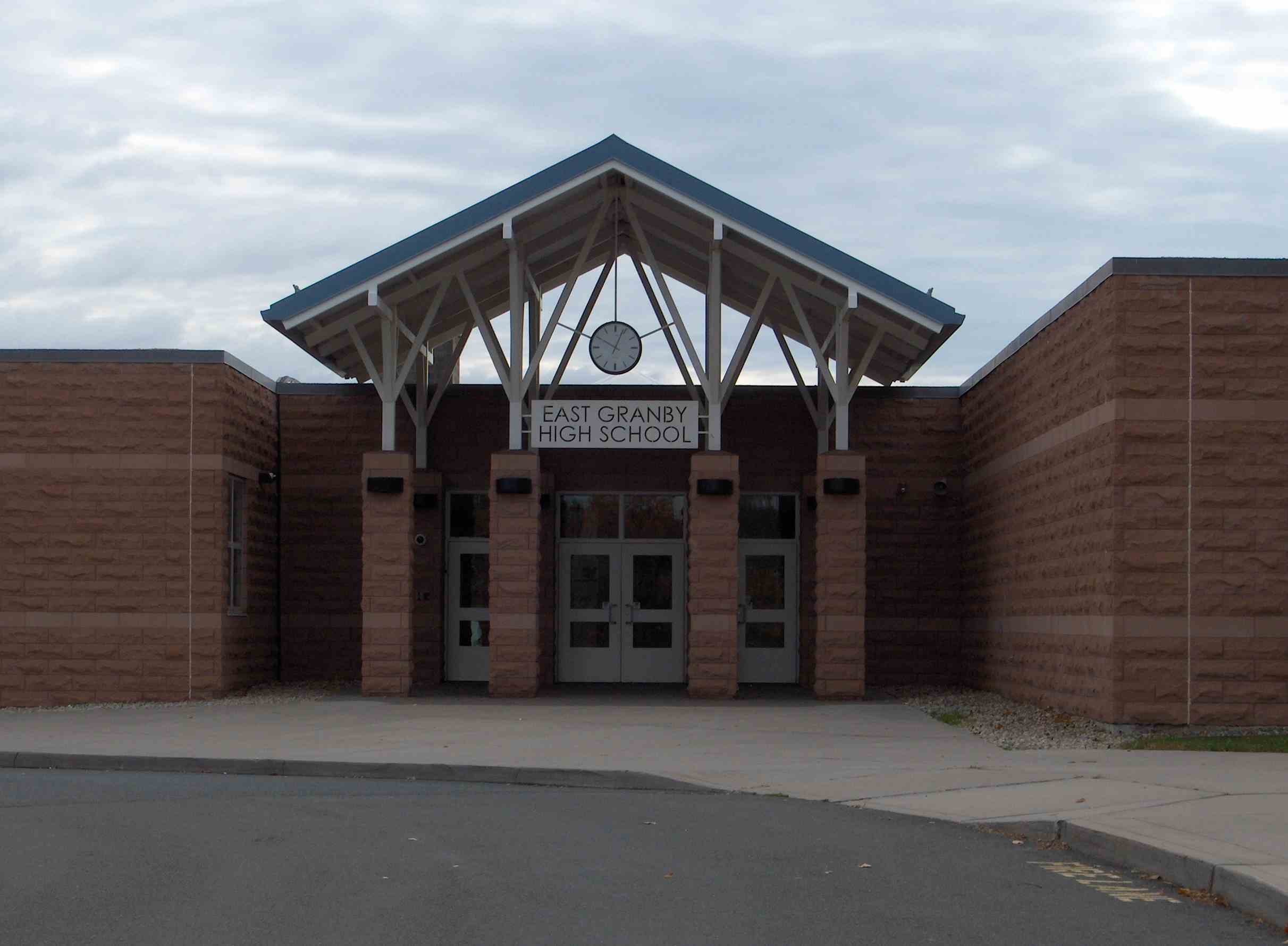

Location
- 95 South Main Street; East Granby, Connecticut 06026; United States; 41°55′59″N 72°43′41″W

Information
- Type: Public
- School district: East Granby Public Schools
- CEEB code: 070163
- Principal: Antonio DeMelo
- Staff: 18
- Grades: 9–12
- Enrollment: 239 (2023-2024)
- Average class size: 15.2
- Colours: Purple and white
- Athletics conference: North Central Connecticut Conference
- Mascot: Crusaders
- Rival: Granby Memorial High School
- Accreditation: New England Association of Schools & Colleges
- Website: high.eastgranby.k12.ct.us

East Granby High School is a public high school located in East Granby, Connecticut. The school has a grade range of 9–12. The total enrollment currently stands at 241. East Granby High School is the smallest public high school in Connecticut.

The East Granby school district is located in north central Connecticut in close proximity to Bradley International Airport. East Granby provides a comprehensive education to 900 students in four distinctive school settings. Classified by the Connecticut State Department of Education as a town in Demographic Reference Group "D", East Granby performs well on state assessments at all levels. Demographic Reference Groups, or DRGs, are groups of districts with similarities in student and family background characteristics. Placement in one of the nine DRGs is based on indicators of socioeconomic status, indicators of need and enrollment.

The building is connected to East Granby Middle School, and some of the teachers and classrooms are shared.
