= Somers High School (Connecticut) =

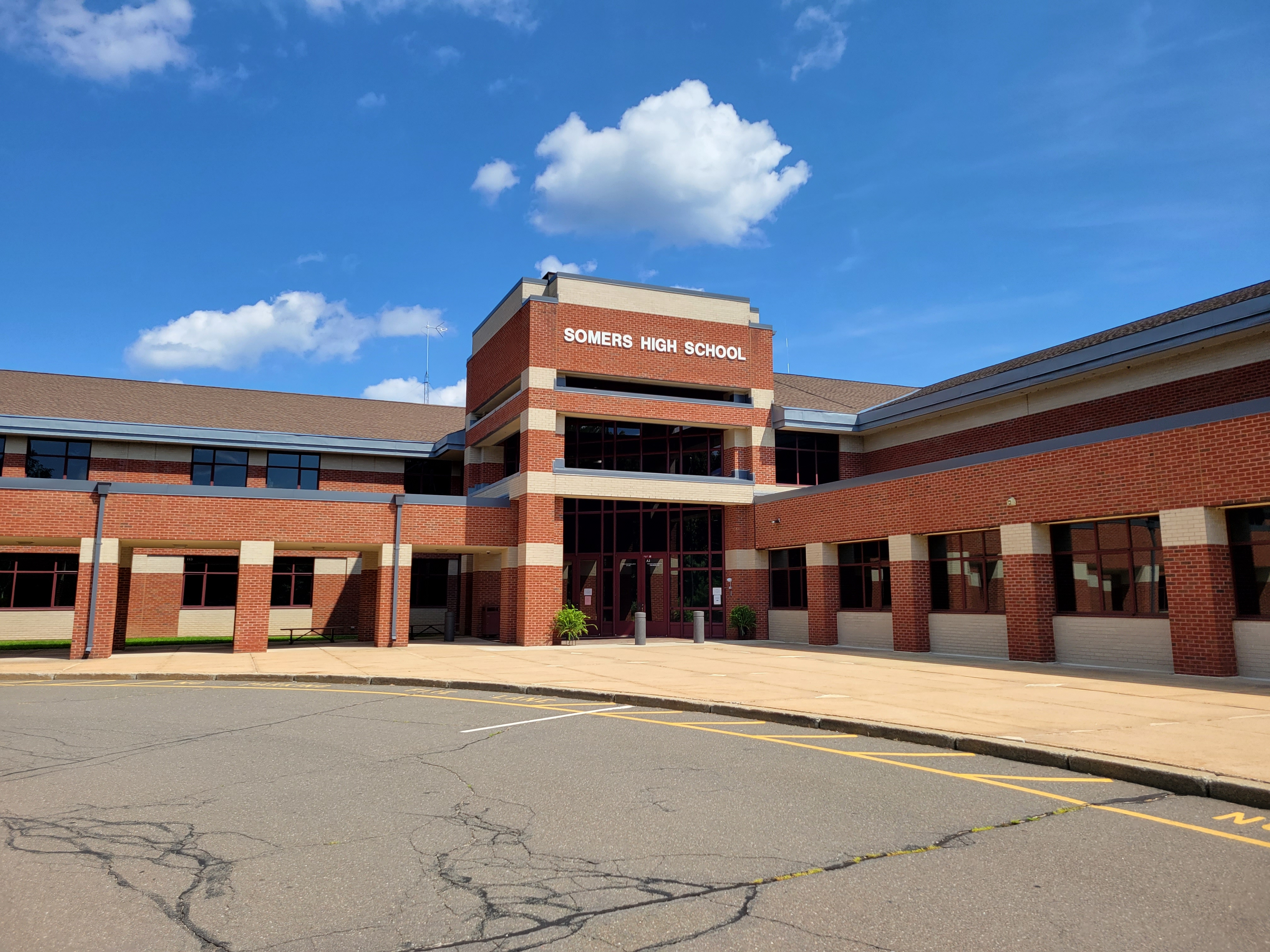
- Somers High School

Location
- 5 Vision Boulevard; Somers, Connecticut 06071; United States; 41°58′37″N 72°27′40″W

Information
- Type: Public high school
- Established: 1962 (64 years ago)
- Oversight: Somers School District
- CEEB code: 070683
- Principal: Jaime Rechenberg
- Grades: 9-12
- Enrollment: 382 (2023-2024)
- Colors: Red, white, black
- Athletics conference: North Central Connecticut Conference
- Mascot: Spartan

Somers High School is a public high school in the town of Somers, Connecticut, United States. It offers advanced placement courses in collaboration with the University of Connecticut. It participates in the Somers-based Four Town Fair with student-run booths and a senior parade float. Available sports include soccer, lacrosse, field hockey, track and field, baseball, softball, basketball, golf, and wrestling.

== Athletics ==
=== CIAC State Championships ===
Team	Year
Boys Soccer	2004, 2008, 2010, 2011, 2014, 2015, 2025
Boys Lacrosse	1996, 1997, 2006, 2016, 2017, 2026
Girls Lacrosse	2026
Girls Cross Country	2021, 2022, 2023
Boys Basketball	1992, 1994
Girls Basketball	1977, 2024
Softball	2019
Wrestling	2010
Girls Outdoor Track	1990
