= Stafford High School (Stafford, Connecticut) =

School in Connecticut, United States

Location
- 145 Orcutville Road; Stafford, Tolland County, Connecticut 06076; United States
- Coordinates: 41°58′21″N 72°18′28″W

Information
- Type: Public
- Motto: Labor Omina Vincit (Work Conquers All)
- School district: Stafford Public Schools
- CEEB code: 070705
- Principal: Marco Pellicia
- Grades: 9-12
- Enrollment: 375 (2023-2024)
- Colors: Blue and white
- Athletics conference: North Central Connecticut Conference, Connecticut Interscholastic Athletic Conference
- Mascot: Bulldog
- Newspaper: The Blue Torch
- Website: shs.stafford.k12.ct.us

Stafford High School is a public high school in Stafford, Connecticut. It serves grades 9-12 and offers a wide variety of programs. It competes athletically as the Bulldogs in many different sports.

== Athletics ==
Stafford High School offers the following sports:

- Football
- Field hockey
- Boys soccer
- Girls soccer
- Cross country
- Indoor track and field
- Basketball
- Baseball
- Softball
- Wrestling
- Outdoor track and field
- Golf
- Ice hockey
