= Columbia, Connecticut =

- Town
- Town of Columbia
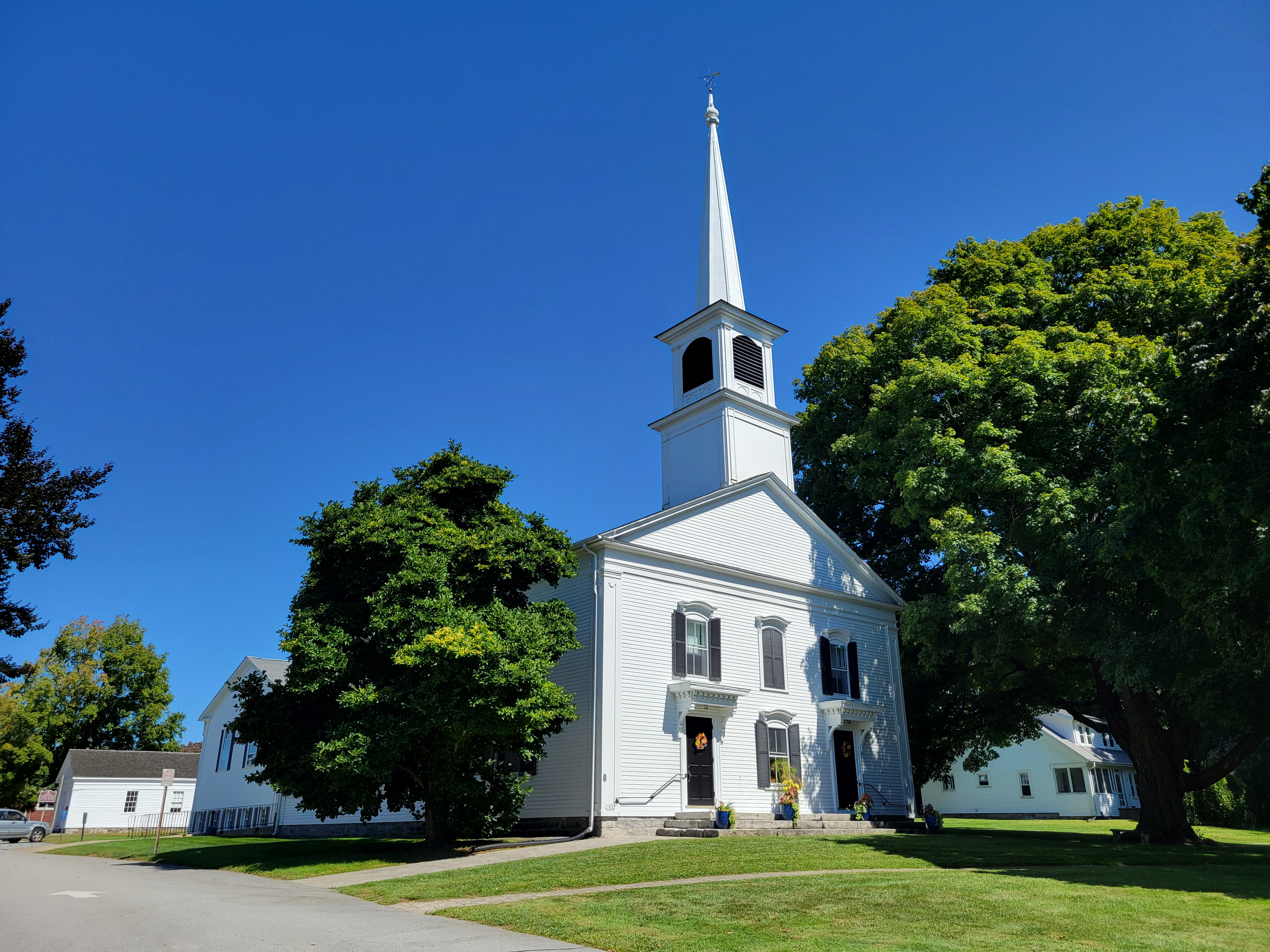
- Columbia Congregational Church

- Seal
- Interactive map of Columbia, Connecticut
- Coordinates: 41°41′28″N 72°18′26″W
- Country: United States
- U.S. state: Connecticut
- County: Tolland
- Region: Capitol Region
- Incorporated: 1804

Government
  - Type: Selectman-town meeting
  - First selectman: Steven Everett (R)
  - Selectmen: Lisa Napolitano (R); Christopher Lent (R); Judy Ortiz (D); William O'Brien (D)

Area
  - Total: 22.0 sq mi (57.0 km^{2})
  - Land: 21.4 sq mi (55.3 km^{2})
  - Water: 0.62 sq mi (1.6 km^{2})
- Elevation: 551 ft (168 m)

Population (2020)
  - Total: 5,272
  - Density: 247/sq mi (95.3/km^{2})
- Time zone: UTC−5 (EST)
  - Summer (DST): UTC−4 (EDT)
- ZIP Code: 06237
- Area codes: 860/959
- FIPS code: 09-16400
- GNIS feature ID: 0213411
- Website: www.columbiact.gov

Columbia is a town in Tolland County, Connecticut, United States. The population was 5,272 at the 2020 census. Originally a part of Lebanon, known as the North Society or Lebanon's Crank, Columbia was incorporated in May 1804. The town was named for patriotic reasons after the national symbol "Columbia".

== Geography ==
According to the United States Census Bureau, the town has a total area of 22.0 square miles (57 km^{2}), of which 21.4 square miles (55 km^{2}) is land and 0.6 square miles (1.6 km^{2}) (2.78%) is water.

== Demographics ==
Historical population
Census	Pop.	Note	%±
1850	876		—
1860	832		−5.0%
1870	891		7.1%
1880	757		−15.0%
1890	740		−2.2%
1900	655		−11.5%
1910	646		−1.4%
1920	706		9.3%
1930	648		−8.2%
1940	853		31.6%
1950	1,327		55.6%
1960	2,163		63.0%
1970	3,129		44.7%
1980	3,386		8.2%
1990	4,510		33.2%
2000	4,971		10.2%
2010	5,485		10.3%
2020	5,272		−3.9%
U.S. Decennial Census

As of the census of 2020, there were 5,272 people and an estimated 2,161 households in the town. As of 2000, the population density was 232.8 inhabitants per square mile (89.9/km^{2}). There were 1,988 housing units at an average density of 93.1 per square mile (35.9/km^{2}). Most recent data shows the racial makeup of the town was 90.1% White, 1.9% African American, 0.3% Native American, 0.0% Asian, 0.0% Pacific Islander, 0.56% from other races, and 5.6% from two or more races. Hispanic or Latino people of any race were 5.4% of the population.

There were 1,864 households, out of which 36.2% had children under the age of 18 living with them, 68.1% were married couples living together, 7.4% had a female householder with no husband present, and 21.5% were non-families. Of all households 17.3% were made up of individuals, and 6.8% had someone living alone who was 65 years of age or older. The average household size was 2.65 and the average family size was 3.01.

In the town, the population was spread out, with 26.2% under the age of 18, 4.6% from 18 to 24, 30.3% from 25 to 44, 28.1% from 45 to 64, and 10.9% who were 65 years of age or older. The median age was 40 years. For every 100 females, there were 95.8 males. For every 100 females age 18 and over, there were 94.7 males.

The median income for a household in the town was $70,208, and the median income for a family was $77,665. Males had a median income of $51,250 versus $37,685 for females. The per capita income for the town was $29,446. About 1.8% of families and 4.2% of the population were below the poverty line, including 6.0% of those under age 18 and 5.3% of those age 65 or over.

== Schools ==
Columbia offers pre-kindergarten through eighth grade education in town at Horace W. Porter School, while high school students have a choice of attending four nearby high schools: E. O. Smith High School, Bolton High School, Coventry High School, and Windham Technical High School, part of the Connecticut Technical High School System.

== Politics ==
Voter registration and party enrollment as of October 29, 2019
Party	Active voters	Inactive voters	Total voters	Percentage
Democratic	1,259	46	1,305	31.86%
Republican	986	36	1,022	24.95%
Unaffiliated	1,527	95	1,622	39.60%
Minor Parties	138	9	147	3.59%
Total	3,910	186	4,096	100%

Presidential election results
Year	Democratic	Republican	Third parties
2020	52.9% 1,888	44.8% 1,600	2.3% 80
2016	47.6% 1,558	45.8% 1,500	6.6% 215
2012	55.7% 1,715	42.9% 1,319	1.4% 43
2008	57.5% 1,843	40.8% 1,306	1.7% 55
2004	57.0% 1,771	40.9% 1,272	2.1% 64
2000	55.8% 1,567	37.1% 1,041	7.1% 196
1996	50.0% 1,271	31.9% 813	18.1% 452
1992	40.6% 1,158	29.5% 839	29.9% 855
1988	45.6% 1,082	53.6% 1,270	0.8% 19
1984	33.2% 673	66.2% 1,341	0.6% 11
1980	30.3% 593	51.2% 1,001	18.5% 361
1976	41.2% 720	58.5% 1,023	0.3% 6
1972	34.5% 583	64.7% 1,092	0.8% 13
1968	44.2% 647	52.5% 770	3.3% 48
1964	62.4% 791	37.6% 476	0.00% 0
1960	41.1% 450	58.9% 644	0.00% 0
1956	20.1% 246	70.9% 599	0.00% 0

== On the National Register of Historic Places ==
- Columbia Green Historic District

== Notable people ==
- Anthony Gregorc, psychologist, currently resides in Columbia
- Dwight Loomis (1821–1903), U.S. congressman and Connecticut Supreme Court justice
- Eleazar Wheelock (1711–1779), educator, founder of Dartmouth College
- Alfred Wright (1788–1853), physician, Presbyterian missionary to Choctaw Nation, translator, educator and founder of Wheelock Seminary, born in Columbia
