= Rockville High School (Connecticut) =

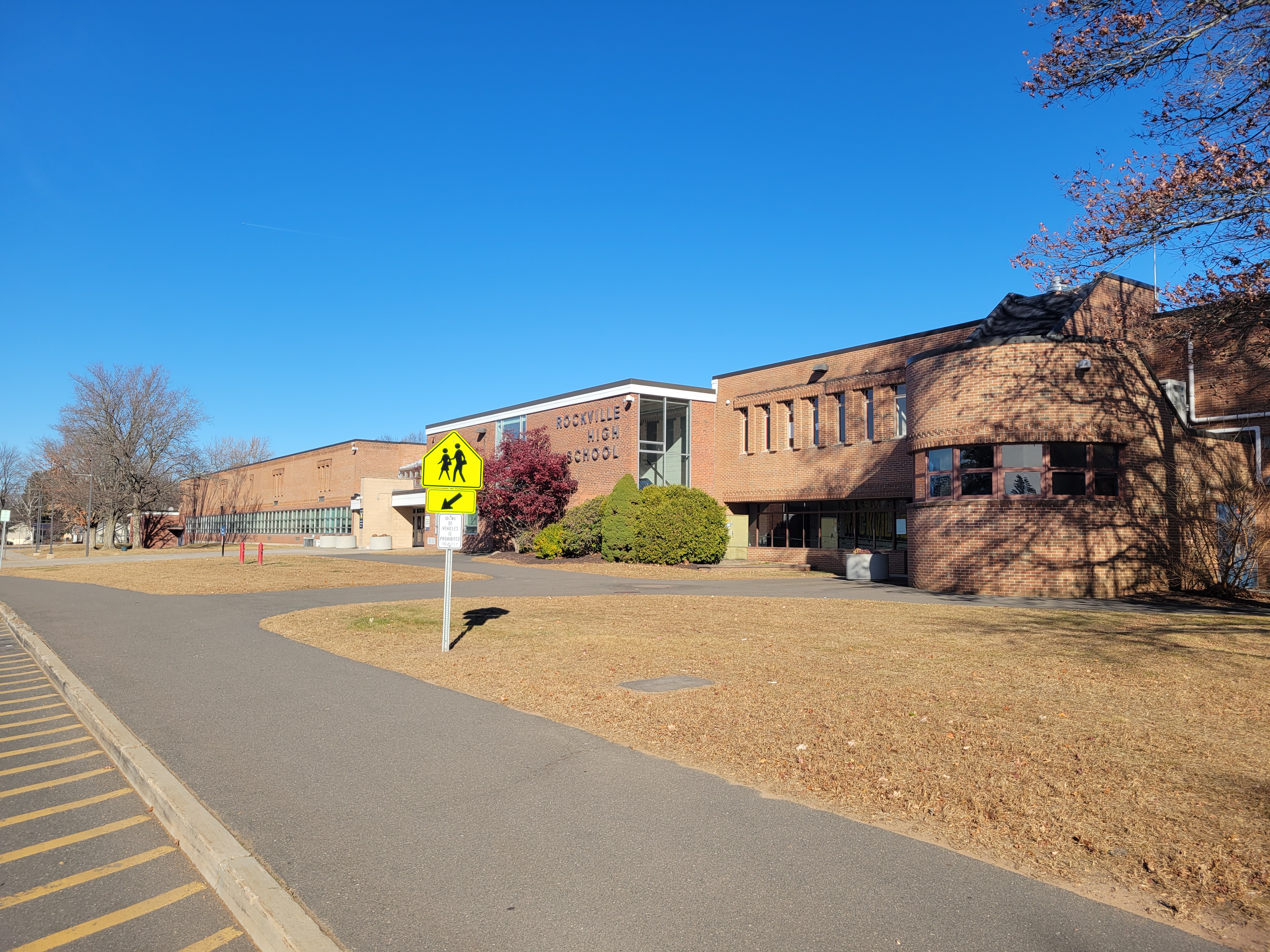

Location
- 70 Loveland Hill Road; Vernon, Tolland County, Connecticut 06066; United States; 41.8567°N 72.4804°W

Information
- Type: Public high school
- Established: 1870 (156 years ago)
- School district: Vernon School District
- Superintendent: Joseph Macary
- CEEB code: 070645
- Principal: Jason Magao
- Teaching staff: 81.80 (on an FTE basis)
- Grades: 9-12
- Gender: Co-educational
- Enrollment: 975 (2023–2024)
- Student to teacher ratio: 11.92
- Campus: Large Suburb
- Colors: Blue and gold
- Athletics conference: North Central Connecticut Conference
- Nickname: Rams
- Website: www.vernonpublicschools.org/o/rhs

Rockville High School is a public secondary school located in Vernon, Connecticut. The school also serves as a vocational agriculture school for the region. The school was established in 1870 and its current building was built in 1958.

== Alumni ==
- Gene Pitney – 2002 inductee to the Rock n' Roll Hall of Fame
- Charles Ethan Porter – African American still life painter
- Bill Romanowski – former professional American football player
- William J. Shea – Connecticut Supreme Court justice
- Mark Warner – former Governor and current Senator from Virginia
