= Canton High School (Connecticut) =

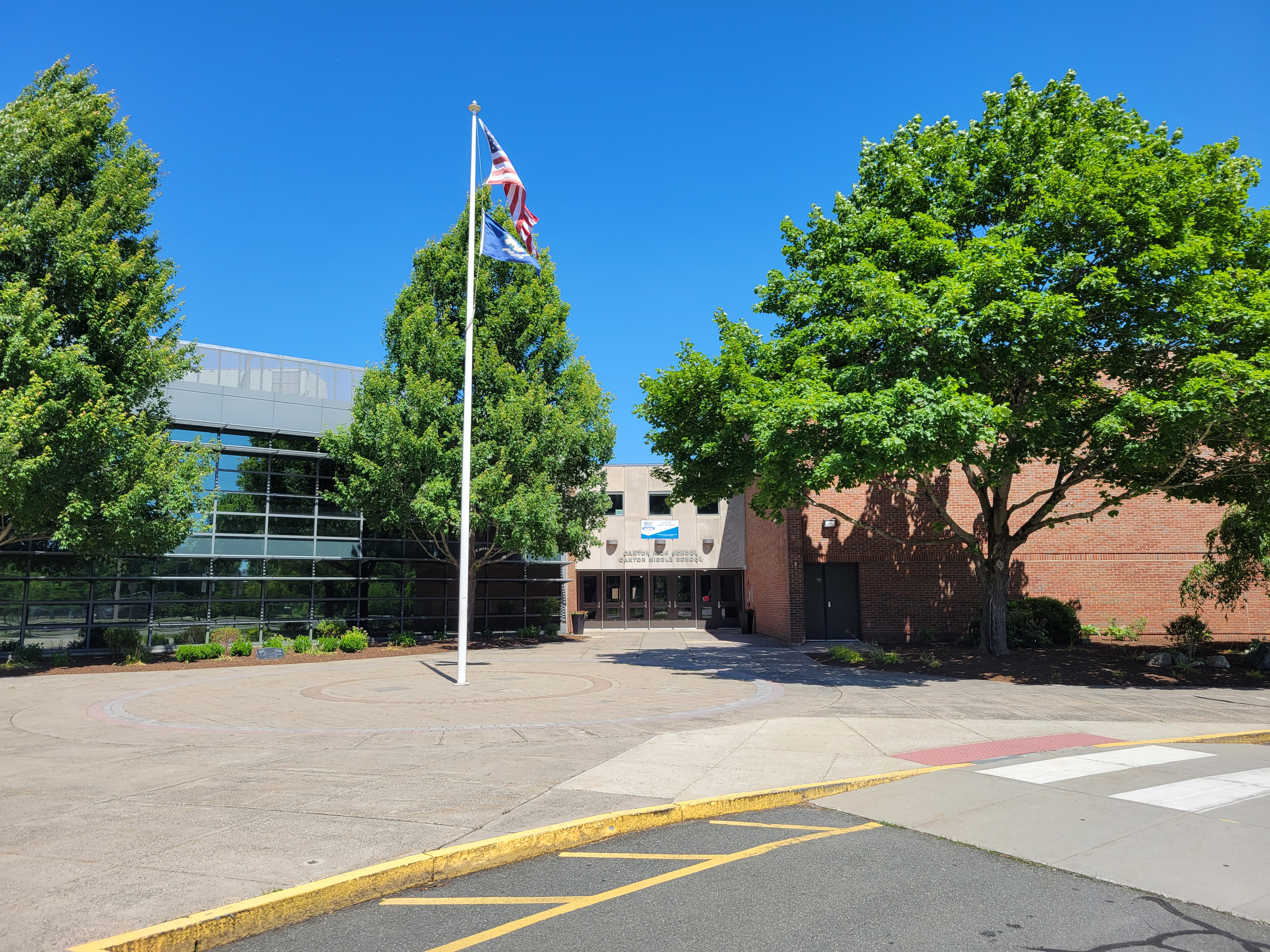
- Canton High School

Location
- 76 Simonds Avenue; Canton, Connecticut 06019; United States; 41°49′25″N 72°54′59″W

Information
- Opened: 1970 (56 years ago)
- School district: Canton Public Schools
- CEEB code: 070115
- Principal: Andrew DiPippo
- Grades: 9–12
- Enrollment: 455 (2023-2024)
- Average class size: ~100 students
- Colours: Maroon, black, white
- Slogan: Respectful, Responsible, Rolemodel
- Athletics conference: North Central Connecticut Conference
- Mascot: Warrior
- Rival: Granby High School, Ellington High School
- Accreditation: NEASC
- Website: www.cantonschools.org/p/canton-high

Canton High School is a secondary school for grades 9–12 located in Canton, Connecticut. Its enrollment is 496 as of 2016. Canton's mascot is the Warrior. It is in part known for its music and arts program.
