= Bolton High School (Connecticut) =

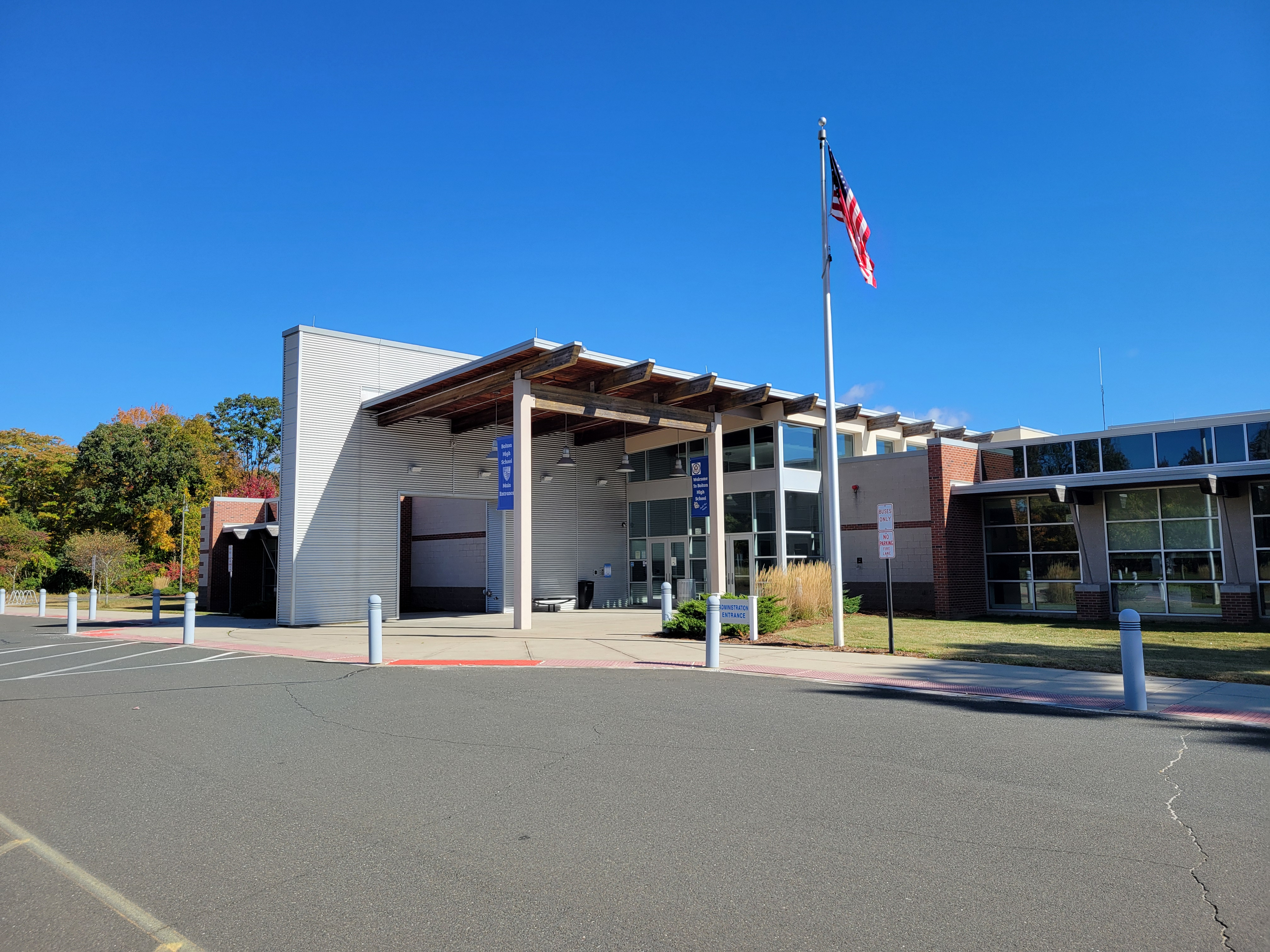

Location
- 72 Brandy Street; Bolton, Connecticut 06043; United States
- Coordinates: 41°45′45″N 72°25′24″W

Information
- Type: Public
- CEEB code: 070038
- Principal: Joseph Maselli
- Grades: 9-12
- Enrollment: 215 (2023-2024)
- Colors: Blue and white
- Athletics conference: North Central Connecticut Conference
- Mascot: Bulldog
- Website: bhs.boltonpublicschools.com

Bolton High School is a public high school located at 72 Brandy Street, Bolton, Connecticut. Bolton participates in the North Central Connecticut Conference (NCCC) for athletics, and competes as a Class "S" school. Bolton High School accepted students from nearby Willington, Connecticut, until that community regionalized in the early 1990s. Academic year 1991-1992 was the last year that Willington students graduated from Bolton High.

== Awards ==
Bolton High School was once ranked as the 11th best public high school in Connecticut by comparison of CAPT scores in Reading across the Disciplines and Mathematics.

Bolton High school won the Blue Ribbon award for public schools in 2017.

Bolton High is currently ranked as the 33rd best public high school in Connecticut. In 2008, 2009, 2011, 2012, 2018, and 2019 they were the state Class S champions in Cross Country.
