= Coventry High School (Connecticut) =

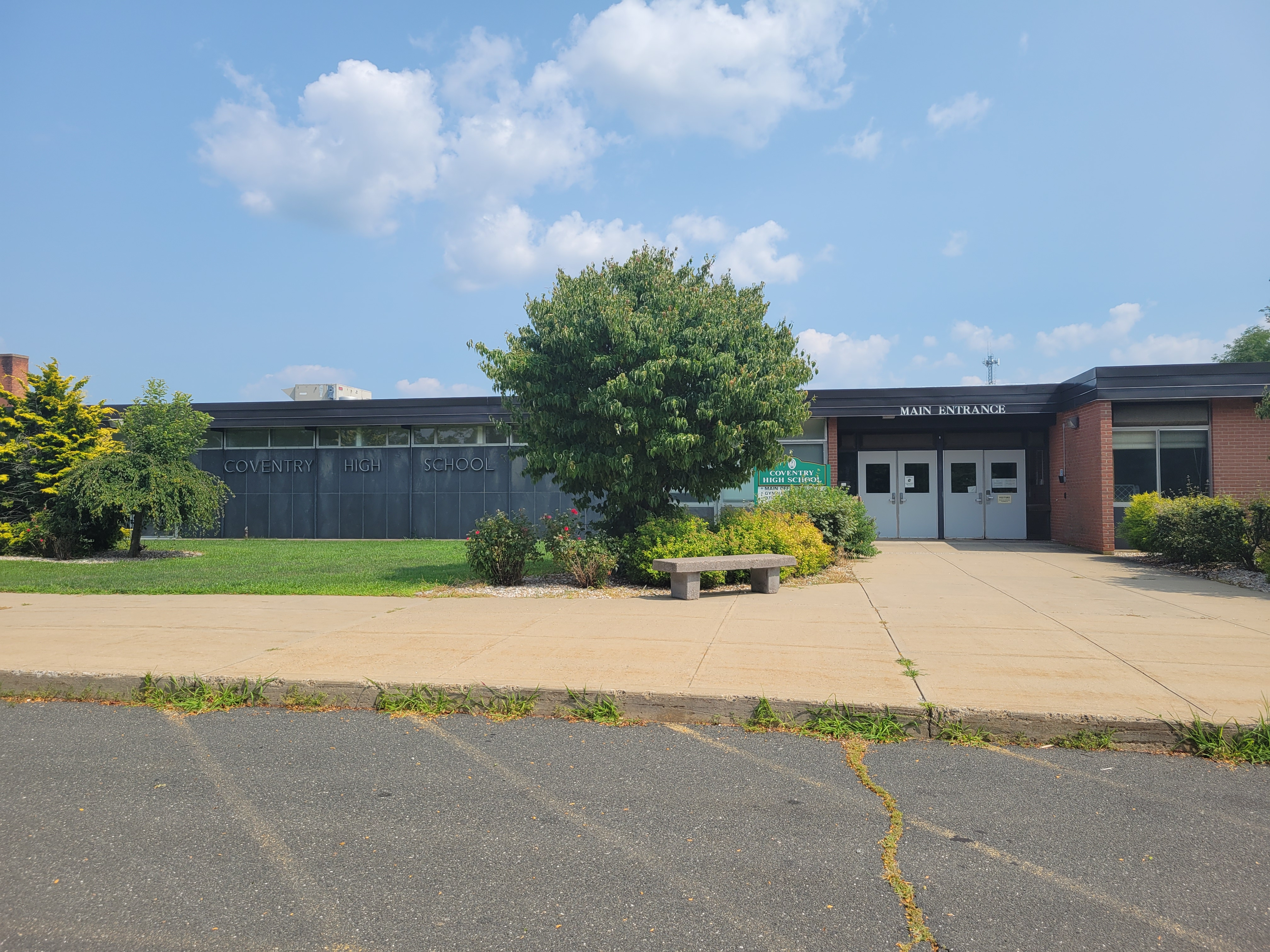
- Coventry High School main entrance

Location
- 78 Ripley Hill Road; Coventry, Connecticut 06238; United States; 41°46′58″N 72°18′50″W

Information
- Type: Public
- Motto: Patriot Pride
- Established: 1956 (70 years ago)
- CEEB code: 070116
- Principal: Joseph Blake
- Grades: 9-12
- Enrollment: 406 (2023–2024)
- Colors: Green and gold
- Athletics conference: North Central Connecticut Conference
- Mascot: Patriot
- Newspaper: Patriot Pages
- Website: www.coventrypublicschools.org/schools/chs

Coventry High School is a public high school for grades 9 through 12 located in Coventry, Tolland County, Connecticut. It is accredited by the New England Association of Schools and Colleges.

== History ==
In 1956, the school district was formed and construction began on Coventry High School. The doors were opened and classes began on September 6, 1956. The original structure contained four hallways and a somewhat central courtyard. An expansion in 1970 added the existing technology education wing, an auxiliary gymnasium, locker room facilities, art area and new library. It remained unchanged for over 30 years.

In 2001, a massive second renovation began which added a new science wing, computer lab, gymnasium with locker room facilities, a significantly larger auditorium, library and media center, band and music rooms and additional classrooms and storage space. Two new courtyards were also created in the process. Construction was substantially completed in the fall of 2002.

== Enrollment data and statistics ==
Public school data from the 2004–2005 school year shows a total enrollment of 610 students. 96% White, 1% Hispanic, 1% Black, 1% Asian and 1% Native American/Alaskan. 36.9% of the students were male, 63.1% female. Number of certified teachers (FTE): 45.7, student/teacher Ratio: 14.8. Coventry High School had a total enrollment of 595 students as of June 2006. Coventry High School had a total enrollment of 472 students as of May 2018.

== Athletics ==
- Baseball
- Basketball - Boys
- Basketball - Girls
- Cross Country
- Football
- Golf
- Ice hockey
- Soccer - Boys
- Soccer - Girls
- Softball
- Tennis
- Track and Field
- Volleyball
- Swimming
- Lacrosse
- Ultimate Frisbee (Coed)

Coventry teams have won championships in recent years: CHS Baseball won the CIAC Championship in 2019, and the CHS Volleyball team won the CIAC Championship in 2017, and came in second in 2018. The Women's Varsity Outdoor Track and Field team won the Class S State Championship for the first time in 2026.

== Academics ==
CHS offers Advanced Placement classes. Students are also able to earn college credits through the University of Connecticut's Early College Experience program, which are also transferable to other universities. CHS also offers classes through the Manchester Community College High School Partnership Program.
