= Bolton, Connecticut =

- Town
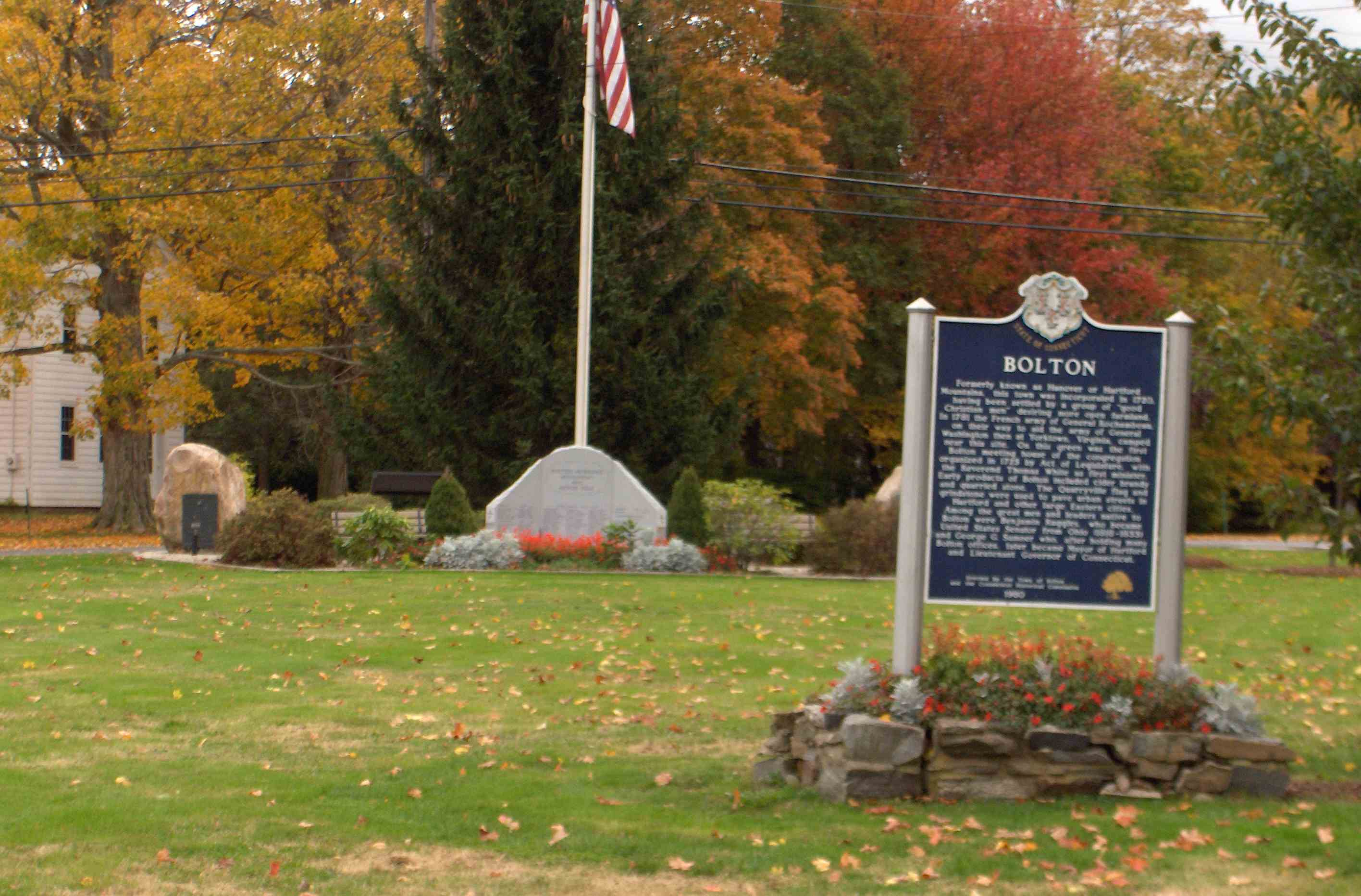
- Bolton Green Historic District

- Seal
- Motto: "A Town for All Seasons"
- Interactive map of Bolton, Connecticut
- Coordinates: 41°45′51″N 72°26′15″W
- Country: United States
- U.S. state: Connecticut
- County: Tolland
- Region: Capitol Region
- Incorporated: 1720

Government
  - Type: Selectman-town meeting
  - First selectman: Rodney Fournier (R)
  - Selectmen: Robert R. Morra (R); Michael W. Eremita (R); Kimberly A. Miller (D); Nicole Sullivan (D)

Area
  - Total: 14.7 sq mi (38.1 km^{2})
  - Land: 14.4 sq mi (37.3 km^{2})
  - Water: 0.31 sq mi (0.8 km^{2})
- Elevation: 728 ft (222 m)

Population (2020)
  - Total: 4,858
  - Density: 337/sq mi (130/km^{2})
- Time zone: UTC−5 (Eastern)
  - Summer (DST): UTC−4 (Eastern)
- ZIP Code: 06043
- Area codes: 860/959
- FIPS code: 09-06260
- GNIS feature ID: 0213393
- Website: www.boltonct.gov

Bolton (/ˈboʊltən/ BOHL-tən) is a small suburban town in Tolland County, Connecticut, United States. The population was 4,858 as of the 2020 census. Bolton was incorporated in October 1720 and is governed by town meeting, with a first selectman and board of selectman as well as other boards serving specific functions. Bolton was named after a town of the same name in England, located near Manchester.

== History ==
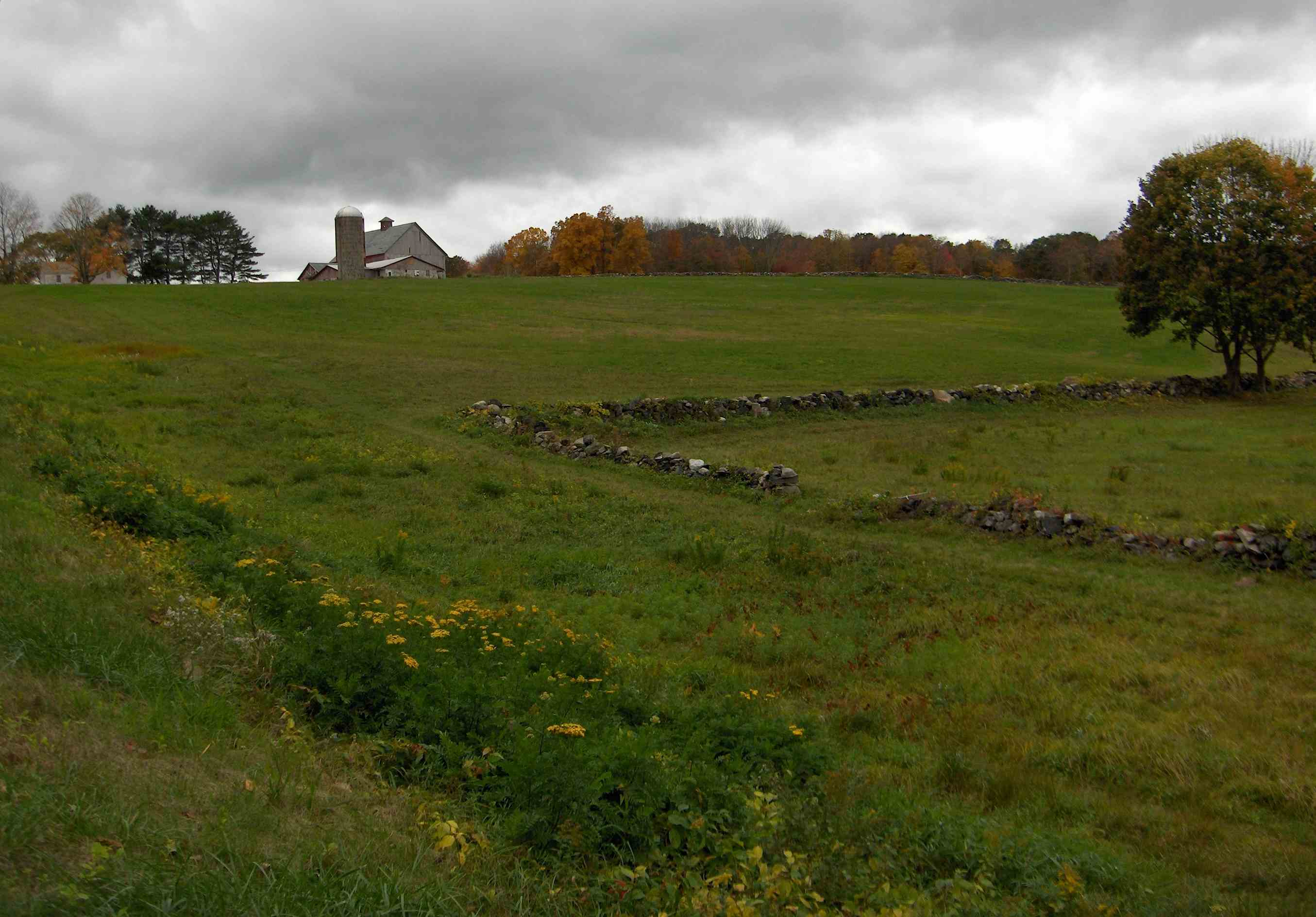
Encampment site with Rose's Farm in background

Originally part of the town of Hartford, the area was referred to as Hartford Mountains or Hanover, until incorporation in October 1720. On November 11, 1723, Jonathan Edwards was installed as the pastor of Bolton. It was here that he had his "great awakening".

Bolton was known for its high quality schist stone in the 18th century, and many tombstone carvers such as Gershom Bartlett and Jonathan Loomis sourced their stone from Bolton quarries.

Bolton was removed from Hartford County when Tolland County was originally formed on October 13, 1785. The northern half of Bolton was set aside in 1808 to form the town of Vernon. Quarries played a significant role in the area's developing economy, and Bolton Notch became the location of the small community of Quarryville. Prior to the railroad, granite was taken by oxcart to the Connecticut River where it was then shipped to major cities on the East Coast.

In recent times, Bolton has purchased several sites in town in an effort to preserve the town's history and rural character. In 2000, the town purchased Rose's Farm, a 100-acre site near Bolton Center where the Comte de Rochambeau camped with his troops in 1781 on their way to victory in Yorktown, Virginia. This site is part of the Washington-Rochambeau Revolutionary Route also known as W3R, a National Historic Trail. It is now known as Bolton Heritage Farm and is open daily to the public. It's a popular spot for walkers and artists, but metal detectors are not allowed. For hikers and bicyclists, it is adjacent and connected to the East Coast Greenway.

Bolton has several ordinances designed to maintain its rural, picturesque character. and to restrict new construction. Ordinances also exist, such as those limiting the types and number of businesses. There is also a requirement that all new residential lots be no smaller than one acre. This was implemented in the 1960's to protect drinking water in a rapidly growing town where every home and business relies on a private well, and most have private septic systems. The town features numerous parks, open spaces and trails.

Interstate 84 was originally planned to cut through the town on its way to Providence, going through Bolton Notch and the Hop River valley. Due to environmental concerns in both Rhode Island and in the Hop River valley, the highway would be cancelled in 1983. The segment that was built beforehand in the northwestern section of town, from Route 85 to US 6/US 44 would be redesignated at Interstate 384.

Bolton today is primarily residential with an economy made up mostly of small businesses. It is part of the Greater Hartford metro and contains many suburban homes.

=== Climate ===
Bolton, like much of Tolland County, straddles the humid continental climate (Dfa) and (Dfb) line.

Climate data for Bolton, Connecticut
Month	Jan	Feb	Mar	Apr	May	Jun	Jul	Aug	Sep	Oct	Nov	Dec	Year
Record high °F (°C)	64 (18)	69 (21)	83 (28)	93 (34)	92 (33)	96 (36)	97 (36)	96 (36)	96 (36)	86 (30)	78 (26)	71 (22)	97 (36)
Mean daily maximum °F (°C)	35 (2)	38 (3)	47 (8)	58 (14)	69 (21)	76 (24)	81 (27)	80 (27)	72 (22)	62 (17)	51 (11)	40 (4)	59 (15)
Mean daily minimum °F (°C)	13 (−11)	15 (−9)	24 (−4)	33 (1)	43 (6)	52 (11)	57 (14)	56 (13)	46 (8)	35 (2)	29 (−2)	20 (−7)	35 (2)
Record low °F (°C)	−32 (−36)	−27 (−33)	−24 (−31)	4 (−16)	20 (−7)	27 (−3)	34 (1)	28 (−2)	19 (−7)	13 (−11)	−5 (−21)	−19 (−28)	−32 (−36)
Average precipitation inches (mm)	4.38 (111)	3.11 (79)	4.32 (110)	4.54 (115)	3.96 (101)	4.25 (108)	4.08 (104)	4.07 (103)	4.54 (115)	4.56 (116)	4.64 (118)	4.02 (102)	50.47 (1,282)
Source: The Weather Channel (Historical Monthly Averages)

== Education ==
Bolton High School is a public school with about two to three hundred students. It underwent major renovations and expansion during 2011, including a new outdoor seating area for the cafeteria, a larger and more technologically advanced library, computer labs and media center, and a new science wing and larger administrative offices. Several other improvements were made including parking, bus lanes and the board of education offices being moved to the location.

The school has a student-teacher ratio of about 12:1 and a combined math and reading proficiency level of 92.5%. U.S. News & World Report ranked it #27 in Connecticut and #1030 in the United States, and it earned a Silver Award in 2012.

Bolton High is affiliated with the NCCC athletic conference.

== Geography ==
According to the United States Census Bureau, the town has a total area of 14.7 square miles (38 km^{2}), of which 14.4 square miles (37 km^{2}) is land and 0.3 square miles (0.78 km^{2}) (1.91%) is water. This includes the Bolton Green Historic District and may include land owned or leased by the State of Connecticut and the U.S. federal government. Bolton does not have any unincorporated land.

== Demographics ==
Historical population
Census	Pop.	Note	%±
1820	731		—
1850	600		—
1860	683		13.8%
1870	576		−15.7%
1880	512		−11.1%
1890	452		−11.7%
1900	457		1.1%
1910	433		−5.3%
1920	448		3.5%
1930	504		12.5%
1940	728		44.4%
1950	1,279		75.7%
1960	2,933		129.3%
1970	3,691		25.8%
1980	3,951		7.0%
1990	4,575		15.8%
2000	5,017		9.7%
2010	4,980		−0.7%
2020	4,858		−2.4%
U.S. Decennial Census

As of the census of 2010, there were 4,980 people, 1,915 households, and 1,438 families residing in the town. The town's residents are primarily middle-class, with some working class and upper middle-class families/individuals. The town has a number of small businesses, as well as a few larger commercial entities, notably the Simoniz corporation, specializing in automotive and car wash cleaning supplies.

The population density in 2010 was 346 people per square mile (133.5/km^{2}). There were 2,015 housing units in the town, of which 100, or 5.0%, were vacant. 86.7% of the occupied units are owned and 13.3% are rented.

The racial makeup of the town was 95.7% White, 1.1% African American, 0.1% Native American, 1.4% Asian, 0.2% some other race, and 1.5% two or more races. 3.00% of the population identified as Latino or Hispanic of any race (the US Census Bureau does not consider Latino a race).

The median age in 2010 was 45.4. 49.4% of the population were male and 50.6% female.

For the period 2012–2016, the estimated median household income was $91,087, and the median family income was $118,958. About 3.2% of the population are living below the poverty line.

Voter registration and party enrollment as of 29 October 2019
Party	Active voters	Inactive voters	Total voters	Percentage
Democratic	1,047	68	1,115	29.84%
Republican	975	63	1,038	27.78%
Unaffiliated	1,408	109	1,517	40.60%
Minor Parties	59	7	66	1.76%
Total	3,489	247	3,736	100%

Presidential Election Results
Year	Democratic	Republican	Third Parties
2020	52.5% 1,727	45.1% 1,482	2.4% 79
2016	46.4% 1,385	48.0% 1,436	5.6% 169
2012	49.24% 1,433	49.26% 1,434	1.5% 44
2008	55.7% 1,692	42.6% 1,300	1.7% 54
2004	50.5% 1,542	47.7% 1,459	1.8% 56
2000	49.3% 1,368	45.0% 1,210	5.7% 159
1996	47.6% 1,210	37.9% 964	14.5% 369
1992	36.7% 1,023	34.9% 976	28.4% 792
1988	42.7% 972	55.9% 1,278	1.4% 33
1984	32.8% 699	66.9% 1,430	0.3% 8
1980	33.5% 665	48.5% 964	18.0% 359
1976	42.5% 817	57.0% 1,097	0.5% 10
1972	35.1% 668	64.2% 1,226	0.7% 15
1968	38.8% 630	55.4% 904	5.8% 96
1964	59.5% 859	40.5% 586	0.00% 0
1960	37.3% 524	62.7% 880	0.00% 0
1956	26.0% 311	74.0% 888	0.00% 0

== Notable people ==
- Aloysius Ahearn, teacher and member of the Connecticut House of Representatives (1975–1977, 1979–1981)
- Joe Brito, soccer player
- Ralph Earl, artist and portrait painter; died in Bolton in 1801
- Ron Hainsey, retired NHL defenceman, Stanley Cup champion (2007)
- Simeon Olcott, US Senator from New Hampshire; born in Bolton in 1735
- Julius L. Strong (1828–1872), U.S. Congressman
- George G. Sumner, politician; Connecticut House of Representative for Bolton; Mayor of Hartford; Lieutenant Governor and Governor of Connecticut; a native of Bolton
- William Williams, born in Bolton on September 6, 1815
