= Walter William Curtis =

American Catholic bishop (1913–1997)

His Excellency, The Most Reverend Walter William Curtis
- Bishop of Bridgeport; Titular Bishop of Bisica
- See: Diocese of Bridgeport
- Appointed: November 21, 1961
- Term ended: June 28, 1988
- Predecessor: Lawrence Shehan
- Successor: Edward Egan
- Previous posts: Auxiliary Bishop of Newark (1957-1961)

Orders
- Ordination: December 8, 1937 by Ralph Leo Hayes
- Consecration: September 24, 1957 by Thomas Aloysius Boland

Personal details
- Born: May 3, 1913 Jersey City, New Jersey, US
- Died: October 18, 1997 (aged 84) Trumbull, Connecticut, US
- Education: Seton Hall University; Pontifical Gregorian University; Immaculate Conception Seminary School of Theology

Walter William Curtis (May 3, 1913 – October 18, 1997) was an American prelate of the Roman Catholic Church. He served as bishop of the Diocese of Bridgeport in Connecticut from 1961 to 1988. Curtis previously served as an auxiliary bishop of the Archdiocese of Newark in New Jersey from 1957 to 1961.

== Biography ==
=== Early life ===
Walter Curtis was born on May 3, 1913, in Jersey City, New Jersey. He studied at Fordham University in New York City. After graduating from Seton Hall University in 1934, he attended Immaculate Conception Seminary, both in South Orange, New Jersey. Curtis then went to Rome to attend the Pontifical North American College.

=== Priesthood ===
Curtis was ordained to the priesthood in Rome for the Archdiocese of Newark by Bishop Ralph Leo Hayes on December 8, 1937. He completed his graduate studies at the Pontifical Gregorian University in 1938.

After his ordination, the archdiocese assigned Curtis as a professor of moral theology at Immaculate Conception Seminary in 1938. He later earned a doctorate in sacred theology from the Catholic University of America in Washington, D.C..

=== Auxiliary Bishop of Newark ===
On June 27, 1957, Curtis was appointed as an auxiliary bishop of Newark and titular bishop of Bisica by Pope Pius XII. He received his episcopal consecration on September 24, 1957, at the Cathedral of the Sacred Heart in Newark from Archbishop Thomas Boland, with Bishops James A. McNulty and George W. Ahr serving as co-consecrators. In addition to his episcopal duties, Curtis was named pastor of Sacred Heart Parish in Bloomfield, New Jersey, in 1958.

=== Bishop of Bridgeport ===
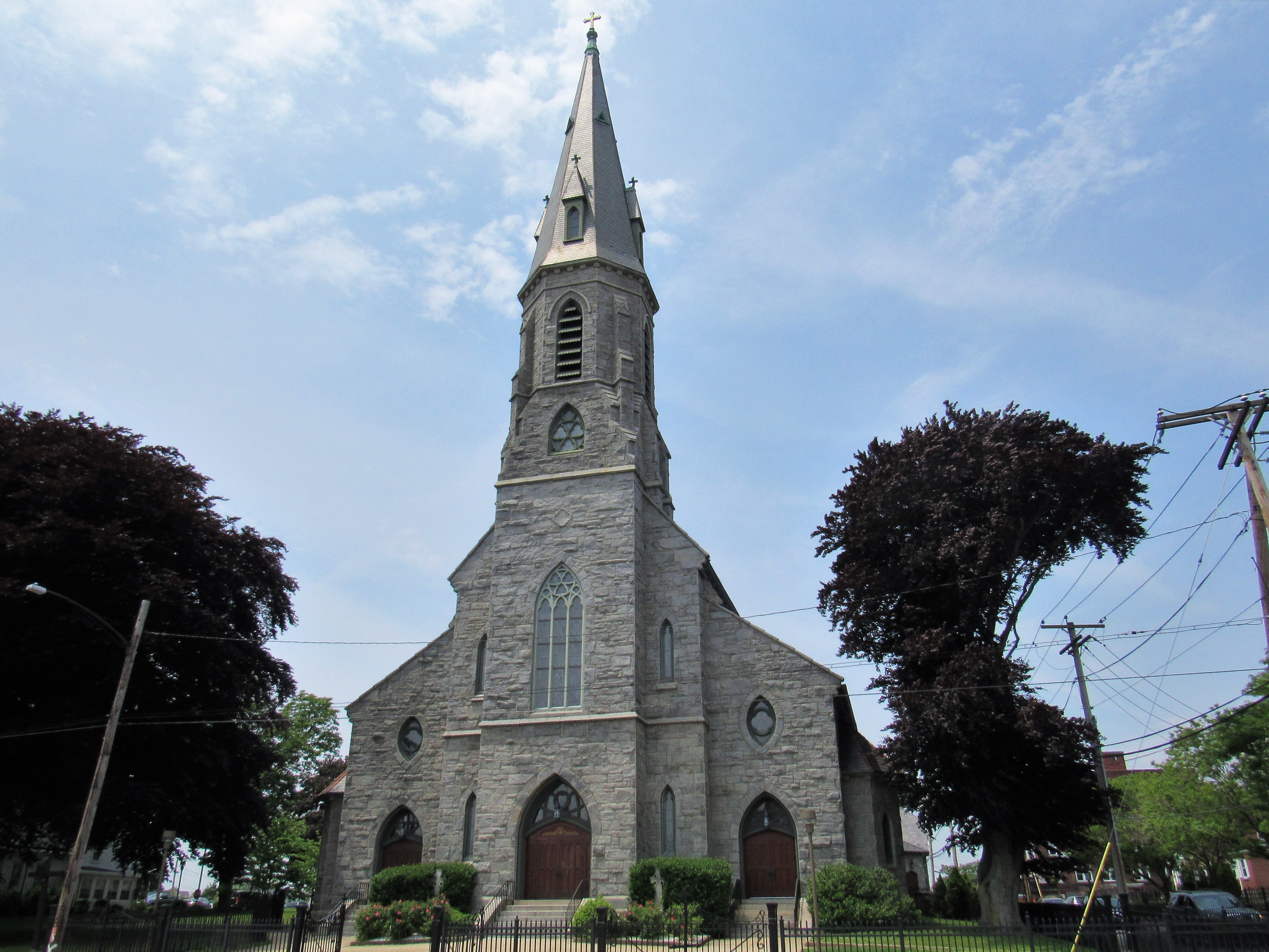
St. Augustine Cathedral, Bridgeport, Connecticut (2019)

Curtis was named the second bishop of Bridgeport by Pope John XXIII on September 23, 1961. He was installed at St. Augustine Cathedral in Bridgeport on November 21, 1961. As bishop, Curtis established the following schools in Connecticut:

- Notre Dame Girls' High School in Fairfield
- Kolbe Cathedral High School in Bridgeport
- Notre Dame Boys' High School in Fairfield
- St. Joseph High School in Trumbull
- Immaculate High School in Danbury
- Sacred Heart University at Fairfield in 1963

Curtis attended all four sessions of the Second Vatican Council in Rome between 1962 and 1965, and spent most of his administration implementing the council's reforms. During the 1970s, he oversaw the renovation of St. Augustine Cathedral and its re-dedication in 1979. He established two nursing homes: Pope John Paul II Health Care Center in Danbury, Connecticut, and St. Camillus Health Care Center in Stamford, Connecticut. The Catholic population in the diocese increased from 286,000 to 300,000. He also founded the Fairfield Foundation, a nondenominational group that helps people in need in Fairfield County, Connecticut.

=== Retirement and legacy ===
Curtis' resignation as bishop of Bridgeport was accepted by Pope John Paul II on June 28, 1988. Walter Curtis died from pneumonia at St. Joseph Manor in Trumbull, Connecticut, on October 18, 1997, at age 84.

In October 2019, former Connecticut Superior Court Judge Robert Holzberg released the results of his investigation, commissioned by Bridgeport Bishop Frank Caggiano, into the diocese's handling of accusations of sexual abuse by its priests. Holzberg found that all three of Bridgeport's bishops, including Curtis, had consistently failed to fulfill their moral and legal responsibilities. Holzberg wrote:

"Bishop Curtis was undisguisedly indifferent to clergy sexual abuse in the diocese, not understanding or acknowledging its scope, and abdicating virtually all responsibility to his subordinates for responding to it, the report stated. “Bishop Curtis did not remove abusive priests from service, and even allowed many to be reassigned to new parishes. By not removing them, he made possible continued abuse of additional victims."

Catholic Church titles
Preceded by Lawrence Shehan	Bishop of Bridgeport; 1961—1988	Succeeded by Edward Egan
