= Saint Clement of Rome Church =

Coordinates: 41°02′03.73″N 73°33′10.32″W

St. Clement of Rome Church
- St. Clement of Rome Church
- Location: 535 Fairfield Avenue; Stamford, Connecticut
- Country: United States
- Denomination: Roman Catholic

Architecture
- Architect: Antinozzi Associates

Administration
- Province: Hartford
- Diocese: Bridgeport

Clergy
- Bishop: Most Rev. Frank Caggiano
- Pastor: Rev. Carlos Rodrigues

St. Clement of Rome Parish is a Roman Catholic church in Stamford, Connecticut, part of the Diocese of Bridgeport.

== History ==
St Clement's Parish covers southwest Stamford along with a portion of Old Greenwich. The superstructure was constructed in the 1960s over the original basement church built in 1929. The architect of the basement church is not known. The superstructure was designed by the noted church architect firm Antinozzi Associates.
