= Saint Gabriel Church (Stamford, Connecticut) =

Coordinates: 41°05′26.48″N 73°32′00.95″W

St. Gabriel Church
- St. Gabriel Church
- Location: 914 Newfield Avenue; Stamford, Connecticut
- Country: United States
- Denomination: Roman Catholic

Administration
- Province: Hartford
- Diocese: Bridgeport

Clergy
- Bishop: Most Rev. Frank Caggiano

St. Gabriel Church is a Roman Catholic parish in Stamford, Connecticut, part of the Diocese of Bridgeport . Is part of St.Cecilia Parish Stamford Connecticut

== History ==
This modern church dates from shortly after the founding of the parish in 1963.
