= St. Marguerite Bourgeoys Church =

Coordinates: 41°27′14.81″N 73°25′09.22″W

- St. Marguerite Bourgeoys Church
- Location: 138 Candlewood Lake Road; Brookfield, Connecticut
- Country: United States
- Denomination: Roman Catholic

History
- Consecrated: 1986

Architecture
- Architect: Kosinsky Association

Administration
- Province: Hartford
- Diocese: Bridgeport

Clergy
- Bishop: Most Rev. Frank J. Caggiano
- Pastor: Rev. Shawn W. Jordan

St. Marguerite Bourgeoys Parish is a Roman Catholic church in Brookfield, Connecticut, part of the Diocese of Bridgeport.

== History ==
St. Marguerite Bourgeoys Parish was founded in 1982. The present St. Marguerite Bourgeoys Church was designed in the late 1980s by Kosinsky Association.
