= Saint Bridget of Ireland Church =

Coordinates: 41°04′12.82″N 73°32′02.34″W

St. Bridget of Ireland Church
- St. Bridget of Ireland Church
- Location: Stamford, Connecticut
- Country: United States
- Denomination: Roman Catholic

Administration
- Province: Hartford
- Diocese: Bridgeport

Clergy
- Bishop: William E. Lori

St. Bridget of Ireland Parish is a Roman Catholic congregation in Stamford, Connecticut, part of the Diocese of Bridgeport. It was established on September 7, 1963 by Walter W. Curtis, Bishop of Bridgeport. Worship first took place in the neighboring chapel and school. The parish supported the parochial school of St. Bridget School until its closure in 1979.

The Church St. Bridget of Ireland

General information
- Architectural style: modernist
- Location: Stamford, Connecticut, United States of America
- Construction started: 1963
- Completed: 1965, 1987
- Client: The Roman Catholic Diocese of Bridgeport

Technical details
- Structural system: Brick-faced masonry (presumed concrete)

The modernist brick church was begun in 1963 and completed in 1965. The dedication of St. Bridget's Chapel-Auditorium-School was on June 25, 1965.
