= Saint Bridget =

Saint Bridget may refer to:

== People ==
- Brigit of Kildare (451–525), patron saint of Ireland, abbess
- Bridget of Sweden (1303–1373), mystic and saint, founder of the Bridgettines nuns and monks
- Saint Bríga, (fl. 6th century), founder of the monastery of Oughter Ard in Ardclough, County Kildare

== Education ==
- St. Bridget College, Batangas City, Philippines
- St. Bridget School, Quezon City, Philippines
- St Bridget's Primary School, Baillieston, Glasgow
- St. Bridget School, Camarines Sur Buhi, Philippines
- St. Bridget's Convent, Colombo

== Churches ==
=== England ===
- Church of Saint Bridget, Liverpool, England

=== Ireland ===
- St. Bride's Church, Dublin (former church)

=== Scotland ===
- St Bridget's Kirk, Dalgety Bay, Fife

=== Wales ===
- St. Bridget's Church, Skenfrith

=== Finland ===
- St. Bridget Church, Loppi

=== United States of America ===
- Saint Bridget of Ireland Church, Stamford, Connecticut, United States
- Saint Bridget Church Loves Park, Illinois, United States

=== Australia ===
- St Brigid's Church, Red Hill, Brisbane
