= Charlie Wallace (basketball) =

American basketball player

Personal information
- Born: March 2, 1948 Okmulgee, Oklahoma, U.S.
- Died: December 9, 2023 (aged 75) Henryetta, Oklahoma, U.S.
- Listed height: 6 ft 6 in (1.98 m)

Career information
- High school: Preston (Okmulgee, Oklahoma)
- College: Oklahoma City (1967–1970)
- NBA draft: 1970: 7th round, 117th overall pick
- Drafted by: Baltimore Bullets
- Playing career: 1970–1976
- Position: Forward

Career history
- 1970–1973: Binghamton Flyers / Trenton / Hamilton Pat Pavers
- 1973–1974: Hazleton Bullets
- 1975–1976: Trenton Capitols

Career highlights
- All-EBA First Team (1972); All-EBA Second Team (1971); EBA Rookie of the Year (1971)
- Stats at Basketball Reference

Charles Edward Wallace (March 2, 1948 – December 9, 2023) was an American professional basketball player.

== Career ==
He was born in Okmulgee, Oklahoma, and attended Preston High School. Wallace played college basketball for the Oklahoma City Chiefs and was selected in the seventh round of the 1970 NBA draft by the Baltimore Bullets.

Wallace played professionally in the Eastern Basketball Association (EBA) from 1970 to 1976. He was selected as the EBA Rookie of the Year while playing for the Trenton Pat Pavers in 1971. Wallace's 877 points and 417 rebounds led the league during the 1971–72 season. He was selected to the All-EBA Second Team in 1971 and First Team in 1972.

== Later life and death ==
After his retirement from playing, Wallace worked for Bama Pies in Tulsa, Oklahoma. He died on December 9, 2023, in Henryetta, Oklahoma, at the age of 75.
