= Continental Basketball Association Rookie of the Year Award =

The Continental Basketball Association Rookie of the Year was an annual award given to the best rookie(s) of the regular season of the CBA. The award was given to players on their first CBA season and with no prior professional experience.

== History ==
The award was established in 1957, when the league was operating under the name Eastern Professional Basketball League. The first winner was Dick Gaines, from Seton Hall. In 1970 the league changed its name, becoming the Eastern Basketball Association. In 1975–76, for the first time in CBA history, the award was shared by two players: Mo Rivers (from NC State) and Walter Luckett (from Ohio). In 1977 a new award, the Newcomer of the Year, was created: while the Rookie of the Year was given to players on their first season with no experience in professional leagues, the Newcomer of the Year was given to players who already had professional experience. In 1996–97 the award was shared by Bernard Hopkins (from VCU) and Jason Sasser (from Texas Tech): Sasser was also called up in the NBA by the San Antonio Spurs. In 2001–02 Rookie of the Year Kenny Inge had started the 2001-02 season with BC Žalgiris in Lithuania, and joined the Rockford Lightning of the CBA on December 20, 2001. Only two players won the Rookie of the Year award and the Player of the Year award during their career: Julius McCoy (Rookie of the Year in 1959, Player of the Year in 1966) and Ken Wilburn (Rookie of the Year in 1967, Player of the Year in 1968 and 1974).

== Key ==
^	Denotes player who simultaneously won CBA Most Valuable Player/Player of the Year Award
†	Denotes player whose team won championship that year
Ref	Reference
Player (X)	Denotes the number of times the player has been named MVP
Team (X)	Denotes the number of times a player from this team has won

== Table ==
Season	Player	Position	Nationality	Team	Ref
Eastern Professional Basketball League
1957–58	Dick Gaines	Guard	United States	Easton Madisons	
1958–59	Julius McCoy	Forward	United States	Williamsport Billies	
1959–60	Alonzo Lewis	Guard	United States	Sunbury Mercuries	
1960–61	Dave Gunther	Forward	United States	Williamsport Billies (2)	
1961–62	Jim Huggard	Guard	United States	Sunbury Mercuries (2)	
1962–63	Emerson Baynard	Forward	United States	Sunbury Mercuries (3)	
1963–64	Ken Rohloff	Guard	United States	Sunbury Mercuries (4)	
1964–65	Swish McKinney	Guard	United States	Wilmington Blue Bombers	
1965–66	Bob Love	Forward	United States	Trenton Colonials	
1966–67	Ken Wilburn	Forward	United States	Trenton Colonials (2)	
1967–68	Don Carlos	Guard/Forward	United States	Hartford Capitols	
1968–69	Richie Cornwall	Guard	United States	Binghamton Flyers	
1969–70†	Eddie Mast	Forward	United States	Allentown Jets	
Eastern Basketball Association
1970–71	Charlie Wallace	Guard/Forward	United States	Trenton Pat Pavers	
1971–72	Craig Mayberry	Forward	United States	Hartford Capitols (2)	
1972–73	Vincent White	Forward	United States	Garden State Colonials	
1973–74	Dennis Bell	Forward	United States	Allentown Jets (2)	
1974–75†	Aulcie Perry	Center	United States	Allentown Jets (3)	
1975–76	Mo Rivers	Guard	United States	Lancaster Red Roses	
1975–76	Walter Luckett	Guard	United States	Long Island Sounds	
1976–77	Major Jones	Center	United States	Allentown Jets (4)	
1977–78	Bill Terry	Guard	United States	Shore Bullets	
Continental Basketball Association
1978–79	Billy Ray Bates	Guard	United States	Maine Lumberjacks	
1979–80	Edgar Jones	Center	United States	Lehigh Valley Jets	
1980–81†	Lee Johnson	Center	United States	Rochester Zeniths	
1981–82	Larry Spriggs	Forward	United States	Rochester Zeniths (2)	
1982–83	Mike Sanders	Guard	United States	Montana Golden Nuggets	
1983–84	Greg Jones	Guard	United States	Wisconsin Flyers	
1984–85	Eric Turner	Guard	United States	Detroit Spirits	
1985–86	Michael Adams	Guard	United States	Bay State Bombardiers	
1986–87	Ron Rowan	Guard	United States	Topeka Sizzlers	
1987–88	Jamie Waller	Guard	United States	Quad City Thunder, Charleston Gunners	
1988–89	Daren Queenan	Guard	United States	Charleston Gunners (2)	
1989–90	Clifford Lett	Guard	United States	Pensacola Tornados	
1990–91	Stephen Thompson	Guard	United States	Rapid City Thrillers	
1991–92	Marcus Kennedy	Forward/center	United States	Grand Rapids Hoops	
1992–93	Gerald Madkins	Guard	United States	Grand Rapids Hoops (2)	
1993–94	Alphonso Ford	Guard	United States	Tri-City Chinook	
1994–95	Kendrick Warren	Forward	United States	Rockford Lightning	
1995–96	Ray Jackson	Forward	United States	Grand Rapids Mackers (3)	
1996–97	Bernard Hopkins	Forward	United States	Yakima Sun Kings	
1996–97	Jason Sasser	Forward	United States	Sioux Falls Skyforce	
1997–98†	Alvin Sims	Guard	United States	Quad City Thunder	
1998–99	Bakari Hendrix	Forward	United States	Quad City Thunder (2)	
1999–2000	Jamel Thomas	Guard/Forward	United States	Quad City Thunder (3)	
2000–01	Not awarded after league went defunct				
2001–02	Kenny Inge	Forward	United States	Rockford Lightning (2)	
2002–03	Immanuel McElroy	Guard	United States	Grand Rapids Hoops (4)	
2003–04	David Bailey	Guard	United States	Idaho Stampede	
2004–05	Jackie Butler	Forward/center	United States	Great Lakes Storm	
2005–06	Roger Powell	Forward	United States	Rockford Lightning (3)	
2006–07	Travis Garrison	Forward	United States	Great Falls Explorers	
2007–08	Anthony Washington	Forward/center	United States	Yakama Sun Kings (2)	
