= Top of the Pops (disambiguation) =

Top of the Pops is a former British television programme.

Top of the Pops may also refer to:

== Spin-offs of the TV show ==
- Top of the Pops 2, an offshoot featuring archive footage from Top of the Pops
- Top of the Pops Reloaded, a children's programme
- Top of the Pops (magazine), a monthly pop-culture publication published by Immediate Media Company

== Musical works ==
- Top of the Pops (record series), a series of albums issued by Pickwick Records
- "Top of the Pops" (song), a 1991 song by The Smithereens
- "Top of the Pops", a song by The Kinks, from the album Lola Versus Powerman and the Moneygoround, Part One, 1970
- "Top of the Pops", a song by The Rezillos from Can't Stand the Rezillos, 1978
- "Top of the Pops", a song by Disco Zombies, 1979
- "(I Can't Stand) Top Of The Pops" by Indecent Assault (band), 1986

== See also ==
- TopPop, a Dutch TV show 1970-1988
- TOTP (disambiguation)
