= Richie Cornwall =

American basketball player (1946–2021)

Personal information
- Born: September 15, 1946 Penndel, Pennsylvania, U.S.
- Died: February 2, 2021 (aged 74) Langhorne, Pennsylvania, U.S.
- Listed height: 5 ft 10 in (1.78 m)
- Listed weight: 160 lb (73 kg)

Career information
- High school: Neshaminy (Langhorne, Pennsylvania)
- College: Syracuse (1965–1968)
- NBA draft: 1968: undrafted
- Playing career: 1968–1980
- Position: Point guard

Career history
- 1968–1971: Binghamton Flyers / Trenton Pat Pavers
- 1971–1974; 1975–1977: Scranton Apollos
- 1977–1979: Wilkes-Barre Barons
- 1979–1980: Lancaster Red Roses

Career highlights
- 2× EBA champion (1977, 1978); All-EPBL/EBA Second Team (1969, 1978); EPBL Rookie of the Year (1969); DBL All-Star (1975)

Richard T. Cornwall (September 15, 1946 – February 2, 2021) was an American professional basketball player. He played college basketball for the Syracuse Orange and professionally in the Eastern Professional Basketball League / Eastern Basketball Association / Continental Basketball Association. Cornwall was nicknamed "The Little General" as a 5 ft 10 in (1.78 m) guard.

== Early life ==
Cornwall was born and raised in Penndel, Pennsylvania, as the son of Thomas and Jean (née MacLeish) Cornwall. He attended Neshaminy High School in Langhorne where he played basketball.

== College career ==
Cornwall received a scholarship to attend Syracuse University and play for the Orange men's basketball team. He played a reserve role as a sophomore during the 1965–66 season behind guards Jim Boeheim and Dave Bing. Earning the nickname "The Little General", Cornwall entered the starting line-up as a junior and started every game for his final two seasons. He averaged 14.7 points per game as a junior and 11.2 points as a senior.

Cornwall remains as one of the best free throw shooters in Orange history. His 88 percent mark set as a junior ranks third-best in program history after Jim Lee and Gerry McNamara. Cornwall's 86.1 career free throw percentage was a record for almost 40 years until McNamara surpassed it in 2006.

== Professional career ==
Cornwall played 11 seasons in the Eastern Professional Basketball League (EPBL) / Eastern Basketball Association (EBA) / Continental Basketball Association (CBA). He was selected to the all-EPBL second team and named as rookie of the year in 1969 while playing for the Binghamton Flyers. He won an EBA championship with the Scranton Apollos in 1977 and the Wilkes-Barre Barons in 1978. Cornwall was selected to the all-EBA second team with the Barons in 1978. He led the EPBL/EBA in assists for three seasons: 174 in 1968–69, 138 in 1969–70, and 146 in 1973–74.

Cornwall also spent one season playing professionally in Holland, and led the league in assists. He appeared in the 1975 Dutch Basketball League All-Star Game.

== Post-playing career ==
Cornwall became a teacher and basketball coach at Harry S. Truman High School in Levittown, Pennsylvania, after his playing career ended. He was inducted into the Bucks County Sports Hall of Fame in 2011.

== Personal life ==
Cornwall was married and had two daughters. One of his daughters married the brother of basketball player Chris Mullin.

Cornwall died in his home in Langhorne, Pennsylvania, on February 2, 2021, after a battle with pancreatic cancer.
