= St. Andrew Church (Bridgeport, Connecticut) =

Coordinates: 41°13′06.17″N 73°13′21.32″W

St. Michael Roscoe
- St. Michael Roscoe
- Location: 410 Anton St; Bridgeport, Connecticut
- Country: United States
- Denomination: Roman Catholic

Architecture
- Architect: Lyons & Mather

Administration
- Province: Hartford
- Diocese: Bridgeport

Clergy
- Bishop: Most Rev. Jimmy Misocky

St. Andrew Church, Roman Catholic Bridgeport, Connecticut is part of the Diocese of Bridgeport.

== History ==
The church dates from the 1960s and was designed by Lyons & Mather of Bridgeport.
