= TOTP =

TOTP may refer to:

- Top of the Pops, a British music chart television programme
- Time-based one-time password, an algorithm in computer security
- "T.O.T.P.", a 2020 song on the album Smoke & Mirrors by The Fizz

== See also ==
- Top of the Pops (disambiguation)
