= Walter Luckett =

American basketball player

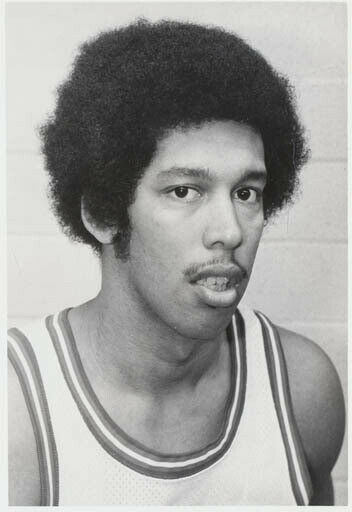
- Luckett with the Allentown Jets, c. 1978

Personal information
- Born: July 24, 1953 (age 73) Bridgeport, Connecticut, U.S.
- Listed height: 6 ft 4 in (1.93 m)
- Listed weight: 190 lb (86 kg)

Career information
- High school: Kolbe (Bridgeport, Connecticut)
- College: Ohio (1972–1975)
- NBA draft: 1975: 2nd round, 27th overall pick
- Drafted by: Detroit Pistons
- Playing career: 1975–1979
- Position: Shooting guard

Career history
- 1975–1976: Gold Coast Stars
- 1976: Long Island Sounds
- 1976–1977: Hartford Downtowners
- 1977–1978: Quincy Chiefs
- 1978–1979: Allentown Jets

Career highlights
- All-EBA Second Team (1977); EBA Rookie of the Year (1976); MAC Player of the Year (1974); 2× First-team All-MAC (1974, 1975); No. 34 retired by Ohio Bobcats; First-team Parade All-American (1972)
- Stats at Basketball Reference

Walter E. Luckett Jr. (born July 24, 1953) is an American former basketball player. Luckett starred at the prep level for Kolbe High School in his hometown of Bridgeport, Connecticut, and played college basketball for the Ohio Bobcats between 1972 and 1975. Following his junior season at Ohio, he declared for the 1975 NBA draft where he was selected by the Detroit Pistons. Luckett played in the Eastern Basketball Association (EBA) / Continental Basketball Association (CBA) and was named Rookie of the Year in 1976.

== High school ==
Growing up, Luckett honed his talents at Nanny Goat Park in Bridgeport. As an eighth-grade student he once scored 59 points against another high school's junior varsity team. This scoring outburst previewed what Luckett would do at Kolbe Boys High School—establish a record-setting career that saw him score more points than any other high school player in New England history, win a state championship, and get named the national high school player of the year as a senior in 1971–72.

Throughout his four-year varsity career, Luckett scored 2,691 points, which as of 2012 is still the highest total in the New England region history. In one game during his sophomore season, he scored 53 points against an opponent, and for his career he averaged 31.1 points per game. As a junior, Luckett led Kolbe to a state championship victory. Then, as a senior, he averaged a triple-double of 39.5 points, 16 rebounds and 13 assists per game en route to being named the national high school player of the year. His great success early on has been attributed to his hard work ethic and the fact that he grew up with, and played every day against, Frank Oleynick and Barry McLeod, both of whom were later drafted to the NBA (although only Oleynick played in any games).

== College ==
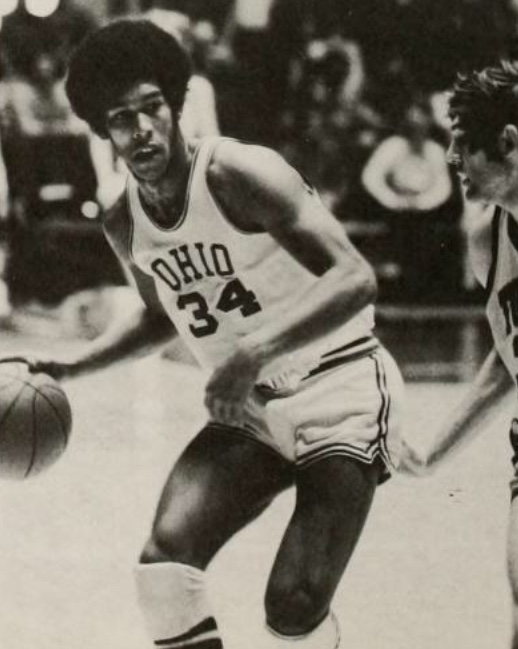
Luckett from the 1974 Athena

Toward the end of high school, Luckett suffered a freak knee injury. It was not serious enough to sideline him from playing his freshman year at Ohio University, but it would later prove to be the undoing of any professional career. In 1972–73, his first year at college, Luckett was featured on the cover of the November 27 issue of Sports Illustrated during the first week of his Bobcat career. He was a confident freshman, proclaiming that he would "drive those rascals wild" when referring to the Missouri Tigers, his first college opponent. After a 3-for-12 shooting performance against them and a rough introduction to National Collegiate Athletic Association (NCAA) Division I basketball, Luckett found his groove and ended up averaging 13.5 points per game for his freshman season.

The following season, Luckett averaged 22.8 points per game and led the Mid-American Conference (MAC) in scoring. The Bobcats earned a berth in the 1974 NCAA Tournament after winning the conference championship. For his efforts he was named the MAC Men's Basketball Player of the Year.

In 1974–75, Luckett's junior season, he increased his scoring average to 25.2 points per game, bringing his career average to 20.5. He earned numerous All-America honors, becoming just the second player from Ohio University to do so. For the second consecutive year he led the league in scoring and repeated as a First Team All-MAC performer. Luckett decided to turn professional after the season, forgoing his NCAA eligibility and hoping to become the next NBA star. He scored 1,625 points in just three seasons, which was the most in school history at the time.

== Later life ==
Luckett was selected in the 1975 NBA draft by the Detroit Pistons. Following the draft, Luckett gained even further notoriety for scoring 28 points in a game against a team that had players like Julius Erving and Earl Monroe on its squad. This game ultimately became the highlight of his post-collegiate basketball career, however, because he re-injured his knee while walking up an escalator. He could not run or even lift his leg, and thus was cut by Detroit prior to ever playing a game in the league.

He went back home to Bridgeport, now with his high school sweetheart-turned-wife, and within a year enrolled at the University of Bridgeport. He finished his undergraduate degree at the school, and for the first several years after graduation he played semi-professional basketball on top of working full-time in business. Luckett played in the Eastern Basketball Association (EBA) / Continental Basketball Association (CBA) for the Gold Coast Stars, Long Island Sounds, Hartford Downtowners, Quincy Chiefs and Allentown Jets from 1975 to 1979. He was selected as the EBA Rookie of the Year in 1976 and named to the All-EBA Second Team in 1977.

Luckett's company, Unilever Home and Personal Care, paid for his Master of Business Administration (MBA) that he earned at the University of New Haven. Luckett eventually became the company's manager of community relations, then after 25 years he retired. Today he resides in Hamden, Connecticut, with his wife Valita.
