= Don Carlos (basketball) =

American basketball player

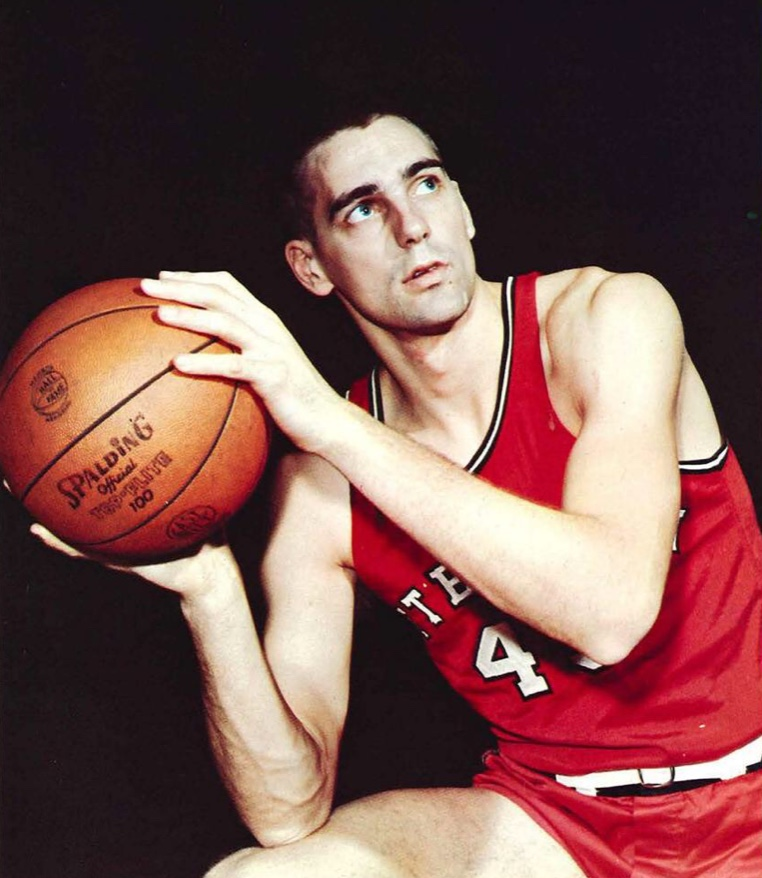
- Carlos from the 1967 Sibyl.

Personal information
- Born: December 15, 1944 (age 81) Columbus, Ohio, U.S.
- Listed height: 6 ft 5 in (1.96 m)
- Listed weight: 210 lb (95 kg)

Career information
- High school: Eastmoor (Columbus, Ohio)
- College: Otterbein (1963–1967)
- NBA draft: 1967: 8th round, 83rd overall pick
- Drafted by: Los Angeles Lakers
- Playing career: 1967–1973
- Position: Shooting guard
- Number: 14

Career history
- 1967–1968: Hartford Capitols
- 1968–1969: Houston Mavericks
- 1969–1973: Hartford Capitols

Career highlights
- All-EPBL First Team (1968); EPBL Rookie of the Year (1968); 4× College Division All-American (1964–1967); 2× OAC Player of the Year (1966, 1967); 4× First-team All-OAC (1964–1967)
- Stats at Basketball Reference

Don A. Carlos (born March 3, 1944) is an American former basketball player.

Born in Columbus, Ohio, Carlos played collegiately for the Otterbein College.

He was selected by the Los Angeles Lakers in the 8th round (83rd pick overall) of the 1967 NBA draft.

He played for the Houston Mavericks (1968–69) in the ABA for 56 games.

Carlos played for the Hartford Capitols of the Eastern Professional Basketball League (EPBL) / Eastern Basketball Association (EBA) during the 1967–68 season and from 1969 to 1973. He was selected to the All-EPBL First Team and as EPBL Rookie of the Year in 1968.
