= Anthony Washington (basketball) =

American basketball player (born 1983)

Personal information
- Born: January 27, 1983 (age 43) Seattle, Washington, U.S.
- Listed height: 6 ft 9 in (2.06 m)
- Listed weight: 245 lb (111 kg)

Career information
- High school: Garfield (Seattle, Washington)
- College: Washington (2002–2004); Portland State (2005–2007)
- NBA draft: 2007: undrafted
- Playing career: 2007–2011
- Position: Center

Career history
- 2007–2008: Yakama Sun Kings
- 2008: Idaho Stampede
- 2008: Albany Patroons
- 2008–2009: Ironi Kiryat Ata
- 2011: London Lightning

Career highlights
- CBA Rookie of the Year (2008); CBA All-Rookie team (2008)

Anthony Wayne Washington Sr. (born January 27, 1983) is an American former professional basketball player. He played college basketball for the Washington Huskies and Portland State Vikings. Washington played professionally in the Continental Basketball Association (CBA) and overseas in Israel, Canada, Germany, Qatar and the Dominican Republic. He was selected as the CBA Rookie of the Year with the Yakama Sun Kings in 2008.

== High school career ==
Washington attended Garfield High School in Seattle, Washington, and played on the basketball team alongside Brandon Roy, Will Conroy and Tre Simmons. Washington helped lead Garfield to a 27–2 record during his senior season in 2000–01.

== College career ==
Washington signed to play college basketball for the Washington Huskies. He was ruled ineligible for the 2001–02 season because he did not meet National Collegiate Athletic Association (NCAA) requirements and his place on the roster was filled by his Garfield teammate Conroy. Washington averaged 4.8 points and 3.2 rebounds per game as a freshman during the 2002–03 season. He missed seven games during the middle of the season due to a foot injury which plagued his Huskies tenure. Washington averaged 3.3 points and 2.1 rebounds during the 2003–04 season. In September 2004, Washington announced that he was leaving the Huskies. He is the only Huskies basketball player with the surname Washington.

In October 2004, Washington transferred to the Portland State Vikings. He was a starter for the Vikings during his first season and averaged 10.6 points and 4.2 rebounds per game. Washington was moved to a part-time starter role during his senior season.

== Professional career ==
On November 7, 2007, Washington signed with the Yakama Sun Kings of the Continental Basketball Association (CBA). He averaged 7.0 points and 3.6 rebounds per game for the Sun Kings during the 2007–08 season. Washington was chosen as the CBA Rookie of the Year and named to the CBA All-Rookie team.

Washington played for Ironi Kiryat Ata of the Israeli Basketball Premier League during the 2008–09 season.

On December 7, 2011, Anthony signed with the London Lightning of the National Basketball League of Canada. On December 24, he was released by the Lightning.

Washington also played basketball in Germany, Qatar and the Dominican Republic.

== Post-playing career ==
After his playing career ended, Washington re-enrolled at the University of Washington to become a teacher. He was inspired by his mother who had gone back to school and his grandparents who were educators. Washington earned his bachelor's degree in American ethnic studies in 2016. He started his teaching career as a substitute special education instructional assistant at a middle school in Seattle.

In 2017, Washington enrolled in the master's program in special education at the University of Washington College of Education.

In 2020, Washington was hired as a special education teacher at his alma mater Garfield High School.

== Personal life ==
Washington's son, Anthony Jr., plays basketball at Roosevelt High School. He encouraged his son to enrol at a different school than Garfield so he could "create a name for himself."
