= Julio Ramirez (academic) =

Julio Ramirez (born in Bridgeport, Connecticut) is the R. Stuart Dickson Professor of Psychology at Davidson College and a national leader in neuroscience education. He received the Presidential Award for Excellence in Science, Mathematics and Engineering Mentoring from U.S. President Barack Obama in 2009.

== Career ==
Ramirez taught at the College of Saint Benedict and Saint John's University from 1981 to 1985. Presently he is the R. Stuart Dickson Professor of Psychology at Davidson College, where he has been since 1986. Ramirez's research interests include the recovery of function after central nervous system injury, with an emphasis on determining the functional significance of hippocampal neuroplasticity. His research has been supported by the National Science Foundation, the National Institute of Mental Health, the National Institute of Neurological Disorders and Stroke, and the North Carolina Board of Science and Technology.

== Recognition ==
Ramirez has received numerous awards and national recognition for his contributions to undergraduate science education and student mentoring. In 1989, Ramirez was named the North Carolina Professor of the Year and a National Gold Medal Professor of the Year by the Council for Advancement and Support of Education in recognition of his contributions to undergraduate science education. In 2004, Ramirez received the Director's Award for Distinguished Teaching Scholars from the National Science Foundation in recognition of his work in education and research.

In 2009, U.S. President Barack Obama awarded the Presidential Award for Excellence in Science, Mathematics and Engineering Mentoring to Ramirez in recognition of his national leadership in neuroscience education. In particular, Ramirez was recognized for co-founding the Faculty for Undergraduate Neuroscience (FUN) in 1991 and serving three years as its first president. The group supports the growth and improvement of neuroscience programs at four-year colleges and universities. Working with grants from the Howard Hughes Medical Institute and FUN, Ramirez also started Support of Mentors and Their Students from Underrepresented Minorities, a program that pairs junior faculty at four-year institutions with undergraduate students and gives them $9,000 to support 10 weeks of research.

More recently, in 2011, Ramirez received the Award for Education in Neuroscience from the Society for Neuroscience. In 2014, he received the Distinguished Career Contributions to Education and Training in Psychology Award from the American Psychological Association for his efforts in creating a national infrastructure to support education and training in behavioral neuroscience and biological psychology, for his role in establishing an undergraduate neuroscience education journal, and for creating a nationally recognized mentoring program for junior faculty and undergraduate students in the neurosciences, particularly for those faculty and students from underrepresented groups in the sciences. Finally, in 2015, Ramirez received the Bernice Grafstein Award for Outstanding Accomplishments in Mentoring from the Society for Neuroscience.

== Education ==
Ramirez graduated from Kolbe Cathedral High School in Bridgeport, Connecticut. He then received his bachelor's degree in psychology from Fairfield University in 1977 and his master's and doctorate degrees in psychology from Clark University. He did his postdoctoral work in neuroscience at the Massachusetts Institute of Technology from 1985 to 1986.
