= Emerson Baynard =

American basketball player

Personal information
- Died: 1997
- Listed height: 6 ft 2 in (1.88 m)

Career information
- High school: Chester (Chester, Pennsylvania)
- College: Allan Hancock (1961–1962)
- NBA draft: 1963: undrafted
- Playing career: 1962–1964
- Position: Forward

Career history
- 1962–1964: Sunbury Mercuries

Career highlights
- EPBL Rookie of the Year (1963)

Emerson Baynard (died 1997) was an American professional basketball player. He played for the Sunbury Mercuries of the Eastern Professional Basketball League (EPBL) and was the EPBL Rookie of the Year in 1963.

== Early life ==
Baynard attended Chester High School in Chester, Pennsylvania. He joined the varsity team as a 15-year-old freshman in 1957 and averaged 8.2 rebounds per game while standing at 6 ft 2 in (1.88 m). Baynard led Chester to a 27–2 record and second-place finish for the state championship as a sophomore. Chester was suspended by the Pennsylvania Interscholastic Athletic Association (PIAA) during the 1959–60 season because of incidents involving Chester students and followers. Baynard averaged 32 points per game during the 1960–61 season to set a new school record. On February 24, 1961, he scored 60 points in a game against Howard High School of Technology which was a record in Delaware County, Pennsylvania. Baynard was a two-time All-State selection.

== Basketball career ==
In May 1961, Baynard signed to play college basketball at Allan Hancock College. He decided to attend junior college instead of major colleges so that he could obtain necessary credits to attend Drake University in 1963. Baynard led Allan Hancock to an 8–0 record with an average of 28.9 points per game until he was forced to leave school due to financial reasons.

In November 1962, Baynard joined the Sunbury Mercuries of the Eastern Professional Basketball League (EPBL). He averaged 21.8 points and 10.1 rebounds per game during the 1962–63 season. Baynard was chosen as the EPBL Rookie of the Year in 1963. He returned to the Mercuries for the 1963–64 season and averaged 13.0 points per game.

In 1964, Baynard enlisted in the United States Army. He played on the basketball team at Fort Gordon and averaged 27 points per game.

In 1969, Baynard was noted as possessing "the belly of a sumo wrestler" during a reunion game at Chester High School. By 1971, he had slimmed down and played in a local recreation league in Chester.

== Legal issues ==
In January 1966, Baynard was arrested alongside three others after a 17-year-old girl accused them of raping her at a property in Chester. The rape charges were reduced to assault after the victim testified that she willingly had relations with one of the accused. On April 1, 1966, Baynard pleaded guilty to charges of corrupting morals of children and fornication. He was sentenced to three months imprisonment at Broadmeadows Prison.

On June 22, 1973, Baynard was arrested on charges of possessing narcotics with intent to deliver when he was pulled over by police and found to be in possession of heroin packets. On June 28, Baynard was arrested on charges of larceny after police alleged that he represented himself as a salesman to his victims and took money for television sets but never returned.

On December 26, 1973, Baynard was stabbed in the back while at his Chester home but refused to identify his assailant to police.

On August 15, 1975, Baynard was arrested on charges of being in possession of stolen goods in connection to the robbery of a meat truck in Chester.

On March 29, 1977, Baynard was arrested on a charge of theft by deception after police alleged that he took money for a television from a victim but did not return.

== Later life and death ==
After his basketball career, Baynard worked a series of odd jobs.

Baynard was buried at Haven Memorial Cemetery in Chester in 1997 without a headstone. In 2018, basketball coach and Chester native Bo Ryan led a group of donors to fund a headstone for Baynard.

Baynard is the subject of the book The Big Em and the Legends of Chester Basketball (1912-2014) by sports historian John "Jack" Lemon.
