= Notre Dame Catholic High School (Connecticut) =

Private school in Fairfield, Connecticut, United States

Location
- 220 Jefferson Street; Fairfield, Fairfield County, Connecticut 06825; United States
- Coordinates: 41°13′26″N 73°14′47″W

Information
- Type: Private, coeducational
- Motto: Be Imitators of Christ
- Religious affiliation: Roman Catholic
- Established: 1955 (71 years ago)
- School district: Diocese of Bridgeport
- CEEB code: 070057
- Principal: Chris Cipriano
- Chaplain: Father Philip L. Phan
- Grades: 9–12
- Enrollment: Approx. 500
- Campus: Suburban
- Colors: Navy Blue and Gold
- Athletics conference: South West Conference
- Mascot: Lancer
- Accreditation: New England Association of Schools and Colleges
- Yearbook: Colophon
- Tuition: $17,500 (2024-2025 school year)
- Website: www.notredame.org

Notre Dame Catholic High School is a private, Roman Catholic high school in Fairfield, Connecticut, United States. It is located in the Roman Catholic Diocese of Bridgeport.

Notre Dame Catholic High School was founded in 1955 by the Most Reverend Lawrence Shehan, who believed "The future of our country depends on our youth. To provide them with sound religious and moral training is a major concern of all of us."

== History ==
The school, built on Park Avenue in Bridgeport, Connecticut, was a co-institution staffed by the Sisters of Notre Dame de Namur, the Holy Cross Fathers, Diocesan clergy and several lay men and women.

In 1956, the first classes of Notre Dame were held at Our Lady of Assumption school in Fairfield while the building was being completed. It opened in September 1957 with a freshman and sophomore class of 1000 students.

In 1964, the school and property of Notre Dame became Sacred Heart University. Two new high schools were established: Notre Dame Girls' in Bridgeport and Notre Dame Boys' in Fairfield. The schools continued to be staffed by the Sisters of Notre Dame de Namur at the girls' school, the Holy Cross Fathers at the boys school, and an increasing number of laity.

In 1973, the two schools were merged into the present Notre Dame Catholic High School, a co-educational institution open to all levels of academic ability and religious background.

In 2024, Sacred Heart University and the Diocese of Bridgeport reached an agreement for the University to purchase Notre Dame Catholic High School for $15 million.
