= Kolbe Cathedral High School =

School in Bridgeport, Connecticut, United States

Kolbe Cathedral Preparatory School

Location
- 33 Calhoun Place; Bridgeport, Fairfield County, Connecticut 06604; United States; 41°10′46″N 73°11′45″W

Information
- Type: Private, Coeducational
- Motto: Work hard and be nice
- Religious affiliation: Roman Catholic
- Established: 1976 (50 years ago)
- CEEB code: 070053
- Principal: Camille Figluizzi
- Faculty: 23
- Grades: 9–12
- Enrollment: 310
- Colors: Sky blue and yellow
- Sports: SWC
- Nickname: Cougars
- Accreditation: NEASC
- Tuition: $8,650
- Affiliation: Diocese of Bridgeport
- Website: kolbecaths.org

Kolbe Cathedral Preparatory School is a private, Roman Catholic high school in Bridgeport, Connecticut. It is located in the Roman Catholic Diocese of Bridgeport.

== Background ==
Kolbe Boys High School and Cathedral Girls High School opened in the 1960s. Kolbe (opened 1963) was staffed by the Franciscans and Cathedral (opened 1964) by the Daughters of the Holy Spirit. In June 1976 Kolbe and Cathedral merged into a co-educational secondary school. Today, Kolbe Cathedral offers an affordable option for working families in greater Bridgeport seeking a Christian alternative to the city's public high schools.

== Alumni ==
- Ramón Colón-López - Retired senior non-commissioned officer of the United States Air Force and former Senior Enlisted Advisor to the Chairman from 2019 to 2023.
- Chris Smith - Class of 1988 - All-Time leading men's basketball scorer at the University of Connecticut. Drafted into the NBA in 1992 and played three seasons for the Minnesota Timberwolves.
- Julio Ramirez – R. Stuart Dickson Professor of Psychology, Davidson College; recipient of Presidential Award for Excellence in Science, Mathematics and Engineering Mentoring
- Walter Luckett - (Kolbe High School) record-setting career that saw him score more points than any other high school player in New England history, win a state championship, and he was named the national high school player of the year as a senior in 1971–72. Played collegiately at Ohio University.
