= Lawrence Shehan =

Catholic cardinal (1898–1984)

His Eminence Lawrence Joseph Shehan
- Cardinal, Archbishop of Baltimore
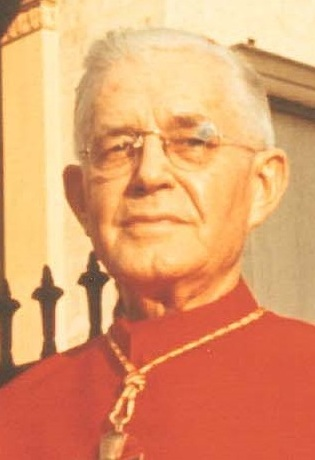
- See: Baltimore
- Appointed: July 10, 1961 (coadjutor)
- Installed: December 8, 1961
- Term ended: April 2, 1974
- Predecessor: Francis Keough
- Successor: William Donald Borders
- Other post: Cardinal-Priest of S. Clemente
- Previous posts: Auxiliary Bishop of Baltimore-Washington (1945–53); Bishop of Bridgeport (1953–61); Coadjutor Archbishop of Baltimore (1961)

Orders
- Ordination: December 23, 1922 by Giuseppe Palica
- Consecration: December 12, 1945 by Amleto Giovanni Cicognani
- Created cardinal: February 22, 1965 by Paul VI
- Rank: Cardinal- Priest

Personal details
- Born: March 18, 1898 Baltimore, Maryland
- Died: August 26, 1984 (aged 86) Baltimore, Maryland
- Buried: Baltimore, Maryland
- Education: St. Charles College; St. Mary's Seminary; Pontifical Urban University
- Motto: Omnia in caritate (All things in love)

Styles of Lawrence Shehan
- Reference style: His Eminence
- Spoken style: Your Eminence
- Informal style: Cardinal
- See: Baltimore

Lawrence Joseph Shehan (March 18, 1898 – August 26, 1984) was an American Catholic prelate who served as Archbishop of Baltimore from 1961 to 1974. He was made a cardinal in 1965. Shehan previously served as an auxiliary bishop of Baltimore from 1945 to 1953 as Bishop of Bridgeport from 1953 to 1961.

As bishop of Bridgeport, Shehan established new parishes and other facilities to meet the needs of the expanding Catholic population, working to create new ministries for Portuguese- and Spanish-speaking Catholics. As Archbishop of Baltimore, he condemned racial discrimination in the archdiocese and participated in the Civil Rights Movement. Shehan was one of the first Catholic prelates to condemn American involvement in the Vietnam War. He was also a strong advocate for building ties with the Protestant and Jewish communities.

Shehan's reputation was tarnished by revelations in 2019 and 2023 that he mishandled sexual abuse allegations against clergy in both Bridgeport and Baltimore.

== Biography ==
=== Early life and education ===
Lawrence Shehan was born on March 18, 1898, in Baltimore, Maryland, to Thomas Patrick and Anastasia Dames (née Schofield) Shehan. Lawrence was one of five children. His father operated a tailors' supply business. Lawrence Shehan received his early education at St. Ann's parochial schools in Baltimore. By the eighth grade, he had decided to become a priest.

In 1911, Shehan began his studies for the priesthood at St. Charles College, a college seminary in Ellicott City. After graduating from St. Charles, Shehan enrolled at St. Mary's Seminary in Baltimore in 1917, earning a Bachelor of Arts degree in 1919 and a Master of Arts degree in 1920.In 1920, the Archdiocese of Baltimore sent Shehan to Rome to continue his studies at the Pontifical Urban University, where he received a Doctor of Sacred Theology degree in 1923.

=== Priesthood ===
On December 23, 1922, Shehan was ordained a priest for the Archdiocese of Baltimore by Archbishop Giuseppe Palica at the Basilica of St. John Lateran in Rome. Following his return to Maryland, the archdiocese assigned Shehan as a curate at St. Patrick's Parish in Washington, D.C., a post he held until 1941. In addition to his pastoral duties, he served as assistant director (1929 to 1936) and director (1936 to 1945) of Catholic Charities in Washington. The Vatican named Shehan as a papal chamberlain in 1939.

In 1941, the archdiocese appointed Shehan as pastor of St. Patrick's Parish. He ended racial segregation at the St. Patrick's school in 1942 and regularly hosted meetings of the Washington branch of the Catholic Interracial Council. The Vatican raised Shehan to the rank of domestic prelate in 1945.

=== Episcopacy ===
==== Auxiliary Bishop of Baltimore ====
On November 17, 1945, Shehan was appointed as an auxiliary bishop of Baltimore and titular bishop of Lydda by Pope Pius XII. He received his episcopal consecration on December 12, 1945, at Saint Patrick's Church in Washington from Archbishop Amleto Giovanni Cicognani, with Bishops Peter Leo Ireton and John Michael McNamara serving as co-consecrators.

The archdiocese appointed Shehan as pastor of Saints Philip and James Parish in Baltimore in 1946. In 1948, Archbishop Francis Patrick Keough named him as vicar general of the archdiocese.

==== Bishop of Bridgeport ====
On August 25, 1953, Pius XII appointed Shehan as titular bishop of Lydda and as the first bishop of the newly erected Diocese of Bridgeport. His installation took place on December 2, 1953.

During his tenure in Bridgeport, Shehan established 18 new parishes, built 24 new churches, and founded three high schools. He also formed a diocesan chapter of the Catholic Youth Organization, promoted vocations to the priesthood and religious life, and began parish ministry for the increasing number of Hispanic, Portuguese, and Brazilian immigrants. In October 1960, Shehan convoked the first synod of the diocese to finish organizing the diocese and to establish a uniform code of practice and discipline for the clergy.

==== Coadjutor Archbishop and Archbishop of Baltimore ====
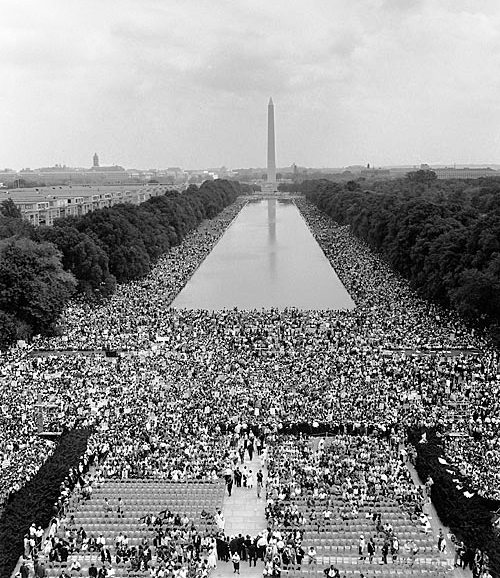
March on Washington for Jobs and Freedom (1963)

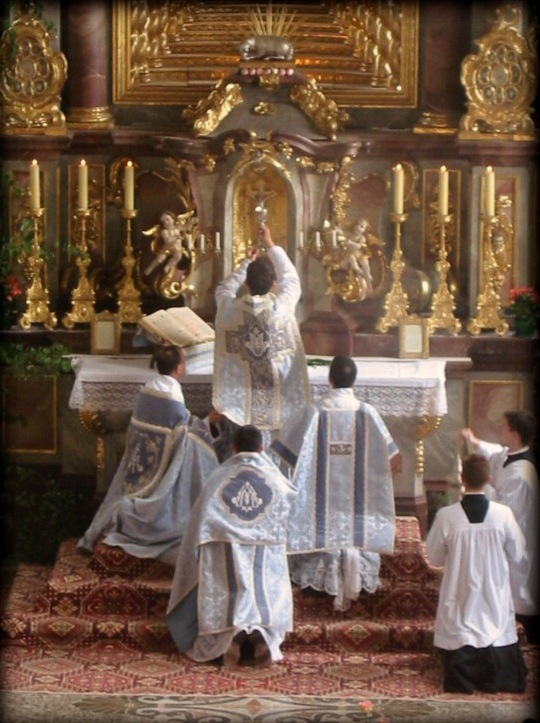
A priest performing the Tridentine Mass (2008)

On July 10, 1961, Pope John XXIII appointed Shehan as coadjutor archbishop of Baltimore and titular archbishop of Nicopolis ad Nestum to assist Keough. When Keough died on December 8, 1961, Shehan automatically became the next archbishop of Baltimore. Upon become archbishop, Shehan immediately published a pastoral letter condemning all forms of racial discrimination. In early 1962, he outlawed discrimination in all archdiocesan institutions and events. That same year, Shehan created a Christian Unity Commission, said to be the first in the United States.

In June 1962, the US Supreme Court ruled in Engel v. Vitale that public school administrators could not compose an official school prayer and encourage students to recite it. In response, Shehan warned that "secularization threatens to become a sort of state religion established by court decree". That same year, Shehan banned racial segregation in the Baltimore Catholic School System. He participated in the 1963 March on Washington, at which Dr. Martin Luther King Jr. delivered his I have a Dream speech. In 1963, Shehan addressed the congregation at an Episcopal church in Baltimore and in 1965 did the same for a congregation in Baltimore synagogue.

Shehan attended the four sessions of the Second Vatican Council in Rome from 1962 to 1965. Paul VI created Shehan as cardinal-priest of S. Clemente in the consistory of February 22, 1965. During the fourth session of the Council in 1965, Shehan assisted Cardinal Leo Joseph Suenens in writing a closing message to artists on December 8, 1965. Within the Roman Curia, Shehan held membership in the Secretariat for Promoting Christian Unity.

In March 1965, Reverend Gommar DePauw, dean of Saint Mary's Major Seminary in Emmitsburg, Maryland, founded the Catholic Traditionalist Movement (CTM). Gommar opposed many of the Second Vatican Council reforms and wanted to preserve the Tridentine Mass. Within a few weeks, Shehan order Gommar to disassociate himself from CTM. He refused to obey Shehan's order and moved to New York City. When Gommar ignored Shehan's order to move back to Maryland, the archbishop suspended Gommar's priestly privileges.

In 1968, Shehan and Harry Lee Doll, the episcopal bishop of Maryland, founded the Ecumenical Institute at St. Mary's Seminary and University in Baltimore to further positive relationships between different religions.

Considered a liberal in many of his positions, Shehan supported the theologian Reverend Charles Curran after he was fired in April 1967 from the faculty of Catholic University of America. Shehan also advocated the abolition of housing discrimination based on race. He condemned American participation in the Vietnam War in 1971, terming the war "a scandal the Christian conscience can no longer endure."While in Australia in 1973, he celebrated a mass for Aboriginal Australians at the Sidney Myer Music Bowl in Melbourne during the 1973 Eucharistic Congress, drawing 20,000 attendees.

=== Retirement and legacy ===
Shehan resigned as archbishop of Baltimore on April 2, 1974, having reached the mandatory retirement age of 75 for bishops. He died of cancer in Baltimore on August 26, 1984, at age 86. He is interred in the Cathedral of Mary Our Queen in Baltimore.

- The Lawrence Cardinal Shehan Chair in Physical Medicine and Rehabilitation at Johns Hopkins University in Baltimore was established in 1993 by Good Samaritan Hospital of Maryland in Baltimore in honor of Shehan.
- The Cardinal Shehan Center, a youth center founded in Bridgeport in 1962, is named after Lawrence Shehan.

On October 1, 2019, former Connecticut state Judge Robert Holzberg issued a report on the handling of sexual abuse allegations against clergy by the Diocese of Bridgeport. The report accused Shehan, when he was bishop there, of transferring priests accused of sexual abuse without discipline.

In April 2023, the Maryland Attorney General's Report on Child Sexual Abuse in the Archdiocese of Baltimore was issued. It accused Shehan of having failed to report several instances of clerical sexual abuse to the authorities despite having direct knowledge of the conduct from both victims and the parents of victims, as well as from other priests.

- Regarding Reverend Joseph Maskell, Shehan had direct knowledge of Maskell's sexual abuse. However, the report stated that, "there is no indication that the Archdiocese took any investigative action as a result" of the reports of sexual abuse.
- Reverend John Carney told investigators in January 2019 that he told Shehan about his sexual abuse of children. According to Carney, Shehan told him to "not talk about it."

== See also ==
- Catholic Church hierarchy
- Catholic Church in the United States
- Historical list of the Catholic bishops of the United States
- List of Catholic bishops of the United States
- Lists of patriarchs, archbishops, and bishops

== Episcopal succession ==
Catholic Church titles
Preceded by none	Bishop of Bridgeport; 1953–1961	Succeeded by Walter William Curtis
Preceded by Francis Patrick Keough	Archbishop of Baltimore; 1961–1974	Succeeded by William Donald Borders
