= St. Augustine Cathedral (Bridgeport, Connecticut) =

Roman Catholic cathedral in the United States

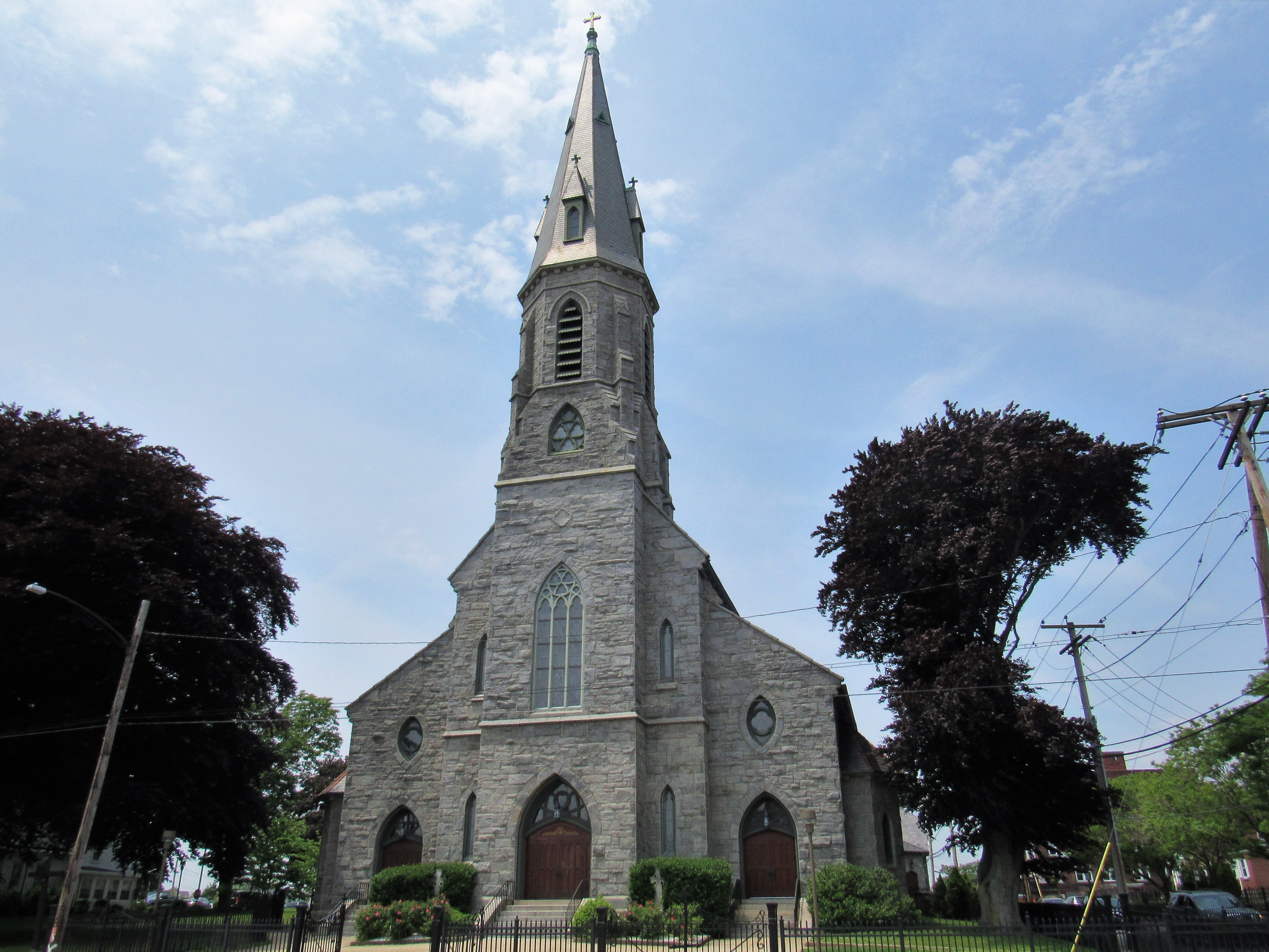

- Location within Connecticut
- 41°10′48.72″N 73°11′44.52″W
- Location: 399 Washington Avenue; Bridgeport, Connecticut
- Country: United States
- Denomination: Roman Catholic Church

History
- Founded: 1842
- Dedicated: March 17, 1868

Architecture
- Architect: Patrick C. Keely (original)
- Style: Gothic Revival
- Groundbreaking: 1866
- Completed: 1868

Specifications
- Height: 180.5 ft (55.0 m)
- Materials: Granite

Administration
- Diocese: Bridgeport

Clergy
- Bishop: Most Rev. Frank J. Caggiano
- Pastor: Very Rev. Arthur Mollenhauer

St. Augustine Cathedral, located in Bridgeport, Connecticut, United States, is the seat of the Roman Catholic Diocese of Bridgeport.

== History ==
St. Augustine's parish was established by Rev. Thomas J. Synnott, as St. James Church at Arch Street and Washington Avenue had become inadequate for the size of the congregation. The cornerstone for the present church was laid on August 28, 1865 and the completed church was dedicated by Bishop McFarland on St. Patrick's Day in 1868. It became a cathedral when the Diocese of Bridgeport was established in 1953.

The edifice went through a major $4 million renovation in 2003 and the capacity was expanded to 750 people. The project was finished in 2004 with new marble tiles, repainted ceilings, a new altar, and other projects. On December 2, 2004, Archbishop Gabriel Montalvo, Apostolic Nuncio to the United States, celebrated the dedication Mass. Bishop William E. Lori and 12 other bishops from around New England and New York concelebrated, in the presence of Cardinal Edward Egan of New York, and Cardinal William Keeler of Baltimore. Archbishop Daniel A. Cronin of Hartford delivered the homily.

In 2014 the pipe organ was rebuilt and expanded to 42 ranks by the A. Thompson-Allen Organ Company of New Haven, Connecticut.

Masses are currently said in English, Spanish, Vietnamese, and Latin (Extraordinary form of the Roman rite).

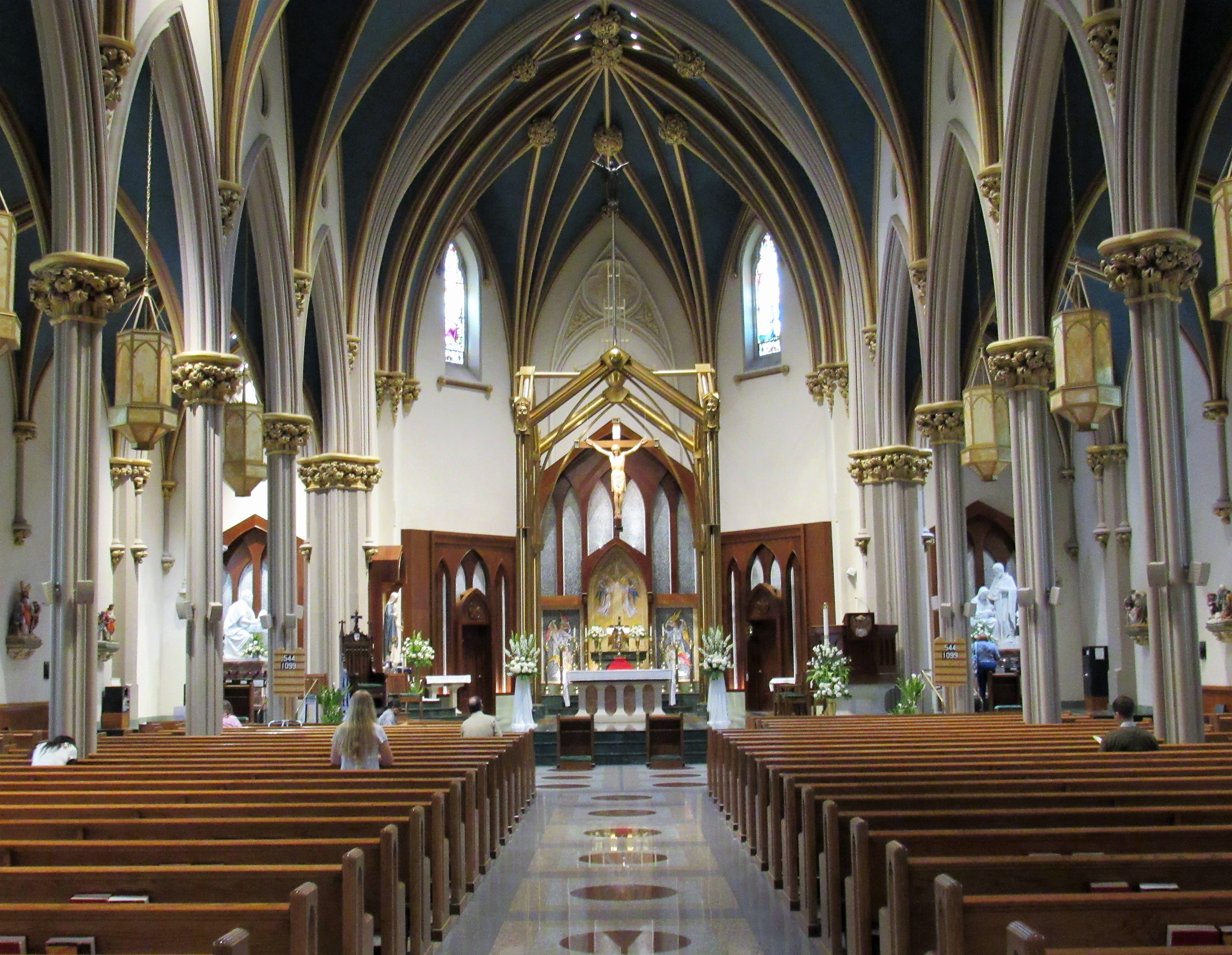
Cathedral interior

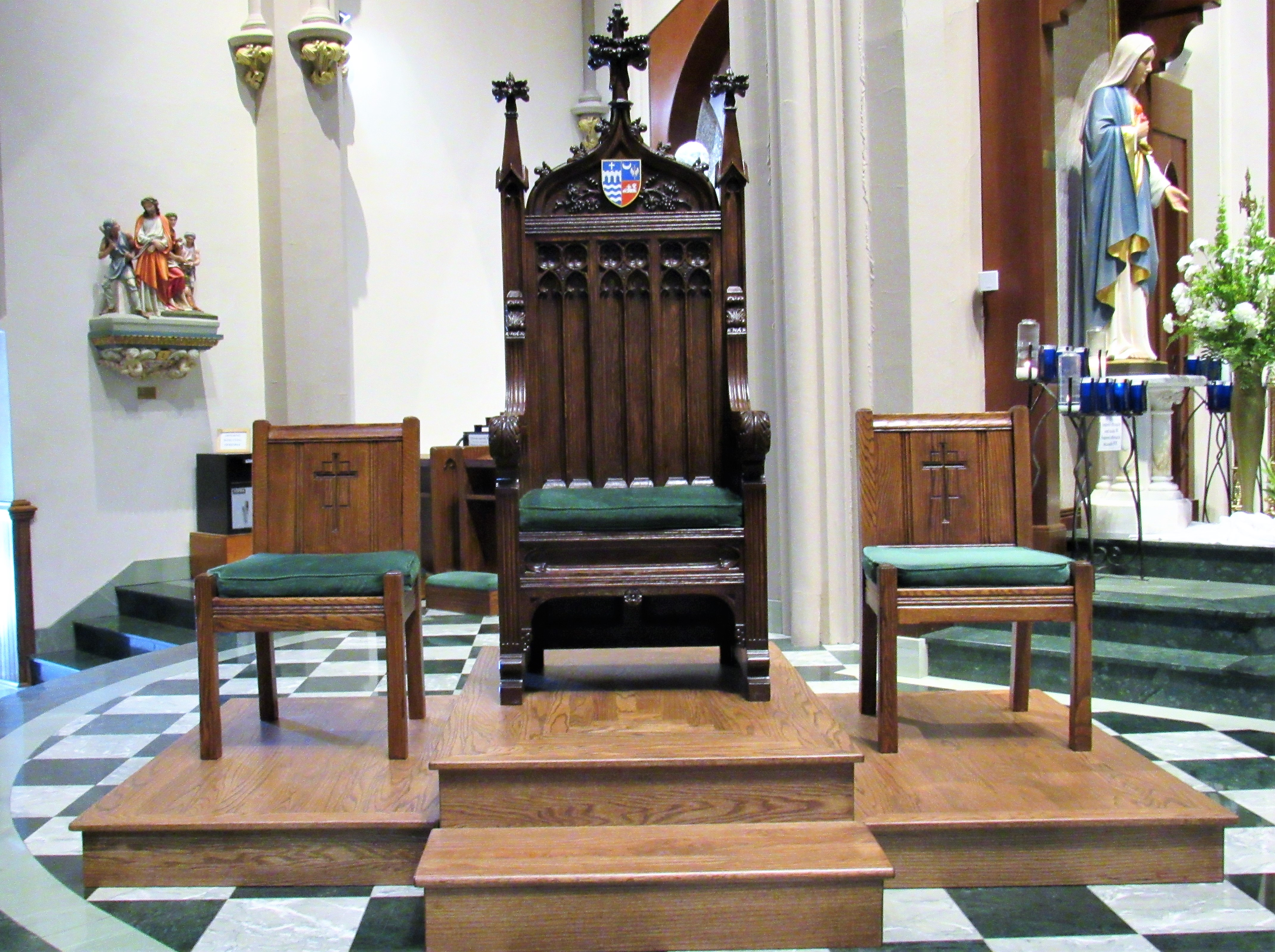
Cathedra

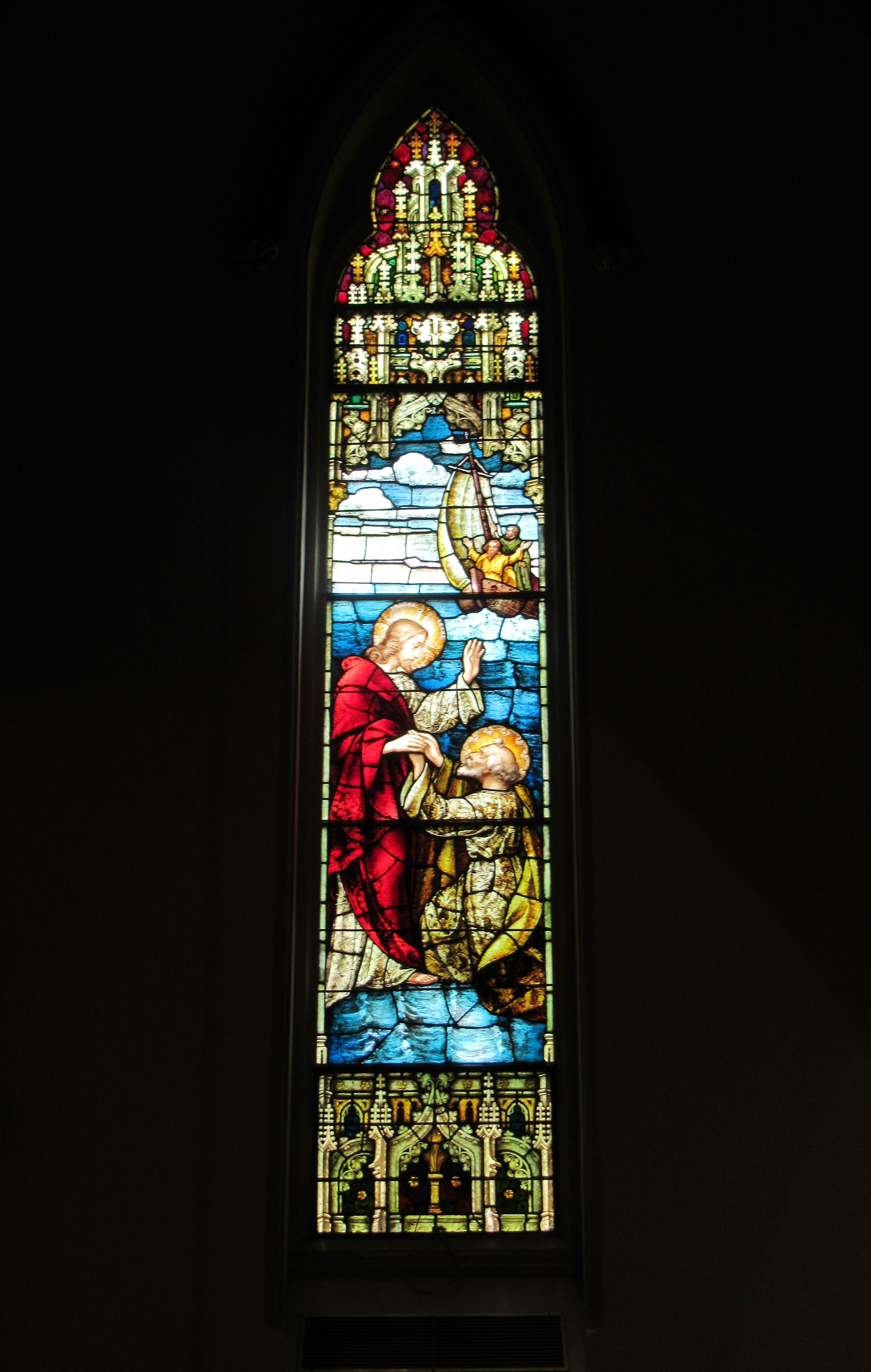
Stained glass window

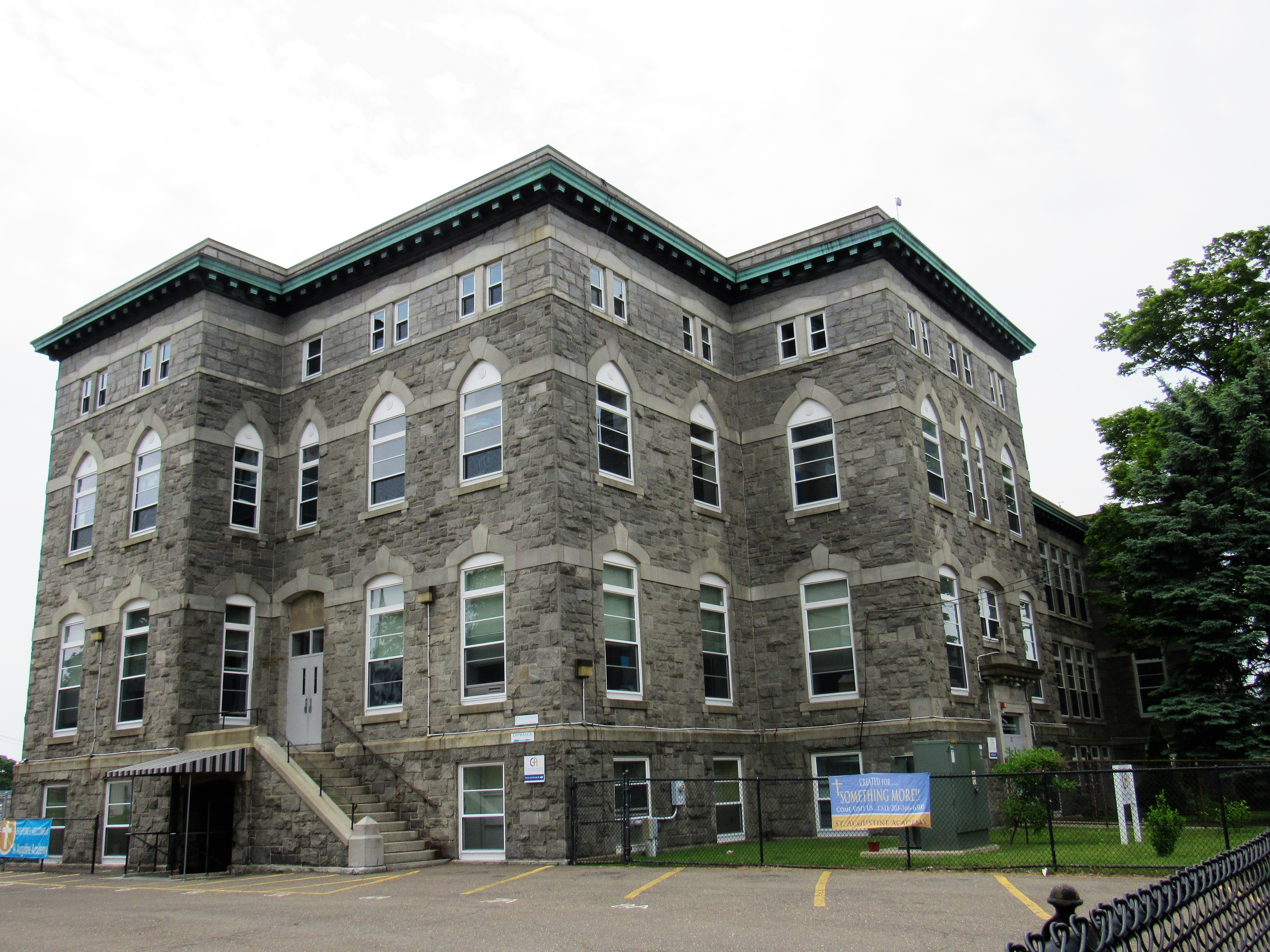
St. Augustine Academy

== See also ==
- List of Catholic cathedrals in the United States
- List of cathedrals in the United States
- History of Bridgeport, Connecticut
