= Indecent Assault =

- Origin: Dudley, United Kingdom
- Genres: Punk
- Years active: Mid-1980s–present
- Label: Reaganstein
- Members: Rat Assault, Shake, Scott
- Past members: Morg, Gary, Viv

Indecent Assault are a UK punk band formed in the mid-1980s based in Dudley in the Black Country of the West Midlands. After a number of changes in personnel, a rushed demo and a handful of local gigs, the band settled with the line-up of Rat on vocals, Shake on bass, Gary on guitar and Morg on drums. This is the line-up that issued 2 EPs on their own Reaganstein label in 1986 and 1987. The first EP has since become a much sought-after item, featuring four songs that blend anarcho-inspired lyrics across a backdrop of tuneful, sing-along punk anthems. The second EP was described as "typical mid-tempo punk thrash", with "far more melodic punk material" on the B-side by Anorexia. The band discontinued shortly after the second EP was released but then started again in 2005, once more gigging regularly and writing and recording brand new material.

Most songs comprise are in the band's unique style that is not instantly noticeable, namely structured of verse and chorus three times and an abrupt finish. Reviews after their appearance at the 2015 Rebellion Festival described them as "an as angry as fuck street punk band."

Indecent Assault made their London live debut on 10 October 2015, supporting the recently re-formed Warwound.

The band continued to gig extensively during 2016, but announced at the end of the year that they would be taking a break from playing live at the start of 2017 to concentrate on a new EP and the long overdue new album. The last gigs featuring Shake took place at the end of 2017.

In December 2018, the band's social media outlets hinted at a return and revealed that Viv Krishan of Contempt had joined on guitar.

On Christmas Day 2018, the band released a poster and statement announcing their first gig back would be on 31 January 2019 in Birmingham, supporting Contempt and Anti Clockwise (France).

== Line-Up ==
- Rat Assault - Bass and vocals
- Shake - Guitar and vocals
- Scott - Drums

== Discography ==
- Rebellious Rantings - Certified Insane by the US Government demo / cassette only release(Toxic Tapes) Tracks - Description of Destruction (spoken word intro), No One Wins, Tomorrows War, Demented Youth, It's Time To See Who's Who, Five More Years
- Welcome to the Service cassette only release (Toxic Tapes) Tracks - Time to See, Nail It, Yes Sir/No Sir, Another Bomb Another Soldier, Find Another Way (limited edition coloured vinyl re-issue planned for Winter 2015 release was shelved; flexi-vinyl in progress August 2018)
- Dawn Of The Android Workers (A1: Nation's Prisoners A2: They're The Murderers B1: (I Can't Stand) Top Of The Pops B2: Have You Ceased To Function?) Reaganstein 1986 - Catalogue No. Bonzo 1
- United We Stand... But So Do They! Indecent Assault: Back Pockets, High Tech, Surf Or Die and B-side by Anorexia (band): New Horizons, Pornography, Remove Your Mask. Reaganstein 1987 - Catalogue No. Bonzo 2
- Still Burning No Way Out, Still Burning, Out of Touch, Dudley Ablaze, Someone's Gonna Die. Reaganstein 2007 - Catalogue No. Bonzo 3
- Three Way Split (Meltdown Records compilation w/ Assert & Rotunda)
- A Snapshot of Control Tracks - A Free Country?, Breeding Ground, Tomorrows War, Children of the 331, Part of the Family, No Government, Just A Myth, Hill 169, Don't Let the Bastards Grind You Down. Reaganstein 2014 - Catalogue No. Bonzo 4
