= Binghamton Flyers =

Former U.S. basketball team

The Binghamton Flyers were an American basketball team based in Binghamton, New York that was a member of the Eastern Professional Basketball League.

The Flyers originally began the 1967–68 season as the Bridgeport (Conn.) Flyers, but relocated to Binghamton after starting the season with a 1–11 record. The Flyers' top scorer in the 1967–68 season was Swish McKinney, who set a league record with 1,206 points in a 32-game season. Herbert Cables served as the general manager while the team was in Bridgeport.

For the next two seasons, the Flyers guarded the Eastern League basement. Although the team began play for the 1970–71 season in Binghamton, a poor 1–6 start and dwindling home crowds forced the Flyers to relocate to Trenton, New Jersey to finish the year.

The team folded after the 1971 season.

== Year-by-year ==
| Year | League | Reg. season | Playoffs |
|---|---|---|---|
| 1967/68 | EPBL | 7th | Did not qualify |
| 1968/69 | EPBL | 5th, Western | Did not qualify |
| 1969/70 | EPBL | 8th | Did not qualify |
| 1970/71 | EBA | | relocated in mid-season |
