= Diocese of Bridgeport =

Latin Catholic jurisdiction in the US

Coordinates: 41°12′42″N 73°12′55″W

Diocese of Bridgeport Dioecesis Bridgeportensis
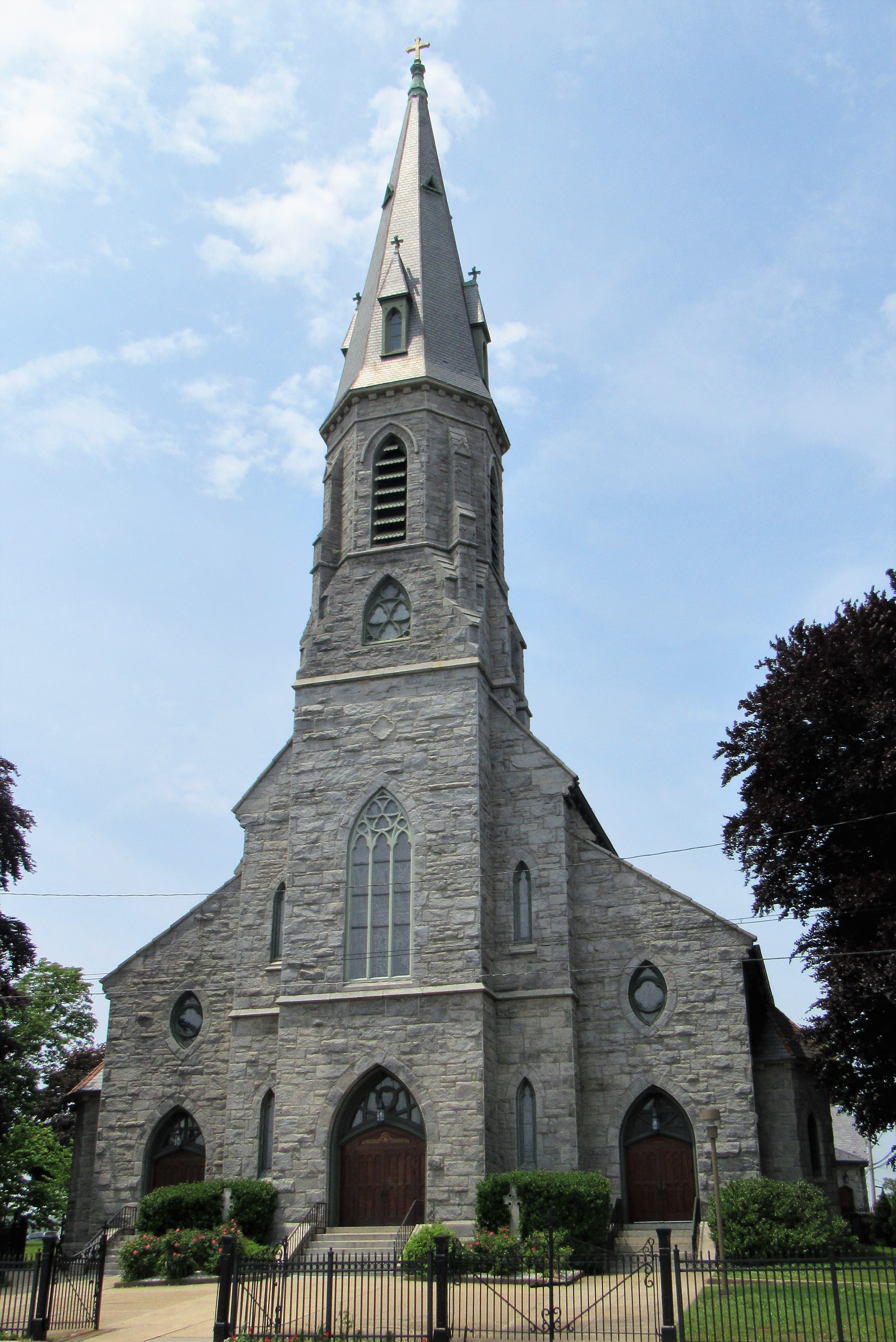
- Cathedral of St. Augustine

- Coat of arms

Location
- Country: United States
- Territory: Fairfield County, Connecticut
- Ecclesiastical province: Hartford
- Metropolitan: Hartford
- Deaneries: Queen of Peace; Mystical Rose; Queen of Martyrs; Our Lady, Queen of Confessors; Seat of Wisdom; Queen Assumed into Heaven; Mother of Divine Grace; Cause of our Joy; Mary, Mother of the Church; Queen of Clergy

Statistics
- Area: 626 sq mi (1,620 km^{2})
- Population: Total; Catholics: (as of 2020); 956,570; 441,000 (46.1 %)
- Parishes: 80
- Schools: 38

Information
- Denomination: Catholic
- Sui iuris church: Latin Church
- Rite: Roman Rite
- Established: August 6, 1953
- Cathedral: Cathedral of Saint Augustine
- Patron saint: Augustine of Hippo

Current leadership
- Pope: Leo XIV
- Bishop: Frank J. Caggiano
- Metropolitan Archbishop: Christopher J. Coyne
- Vicar General: Robert M. Kinnally
- Judicial Vicar: Arthur C. Mollenhauer

Map
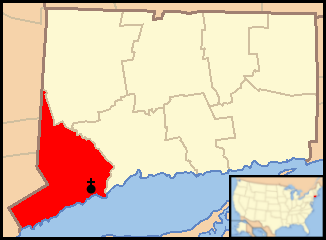

Website
- bridgeportdiocese.org

The Diocese of Bridgeport (Latin: Dioecesis Bridgeportensis) is a diocese of the Catholic Church located in the southwestern part of the state of Connecticut in the United States. It is a suffragan diocese of the metropolitan Archdiocese of Hartford. It includes all of Fairfield County, Connecticut. Its cathedral is St. Augustine Cathedral in Bridgeport. The bishop is Frank Caggiano.

== Description ==
The Diocese of Bridgeport is one of four dioceses in the Ecclesiastical Province of Hartford—the others are the Archdiocese of Hartford, the Diocese of Norwich and the Diocese of Providence.

The largest church in the Diocese of Bridgeport is St. Mary's Church in Stamford, built in 1928. Sacred Heart Parish in Georgetown was the home parish for American writers Flannery O'Connor and Robert Fitzgerald from 1949 to 1952 when O'Connor was living in Ridgefield as a boarder with the Fitzgeralds. ("The working day as we set it up that fall began with early mass in Georgetown, four miles away," Fitzgerald wrote.)

== Demographics ==
As of 2023, the Diocese of Bridgeport had over 420,000 registered Catholics, 45 percent of the total county population.

== History ==
=== 1700 to 1800 ===
In the 17th and much of the 18th centuries, Puritan ministers in the British Province of Connecticut were vociferously anti-Catholic in their writings and preaching. They considered the Catholic Church to be a foreign political power, with Catholics only having loyalty to the Vatican. Catholics were prohibited from buying land or running for public office without first publicly disowning their church. This began to change with the onset of the American Revolution:

"In the summer of 1781, French Marshal Jean-Baptiste Rochambeau and his army marched through Connecticut, encamping in the Ridgebury section of Ridgefield, where the first Catholic mass [in Fairfield County] was offered. His troops were mostly Catholic and were ministered to by Reverend Fathers Robin, Gluson, Lacy, and Saint Pierre."

After the American Revolution ended in 1783, attitudes towards Catholics in the United States began to change. The Connecticut General Assembly passed an act of toleration in 1784, allowing any Protestant to avoid paying taxes to support the local Congregational Church, provided that they could prove membership and regular attendance at another Protestant church.

The US Constitution, ratified in 1789, guaranteed religious freedom for all religions. That same year, the Vatican erected the Diocese of Baltimore to cover the entire territory of the United States, including Connecticut. In 1791, the Assembly passed an act of toleration to all Christians, including Catholics. However, the act had little practical effect for Catholics as there were no parishes then in the state.

=== 1800 to 1850 ===
The first Catholic church in Connecticut, Holy Trinity, was dedicated in 1830 in Hartford, with James Fitton as its pastor. Also in 1830, Fitton celebrated the first mass in Bridgeport in a private home. From 1832 to 1837, James McDermot visited Hartford from New Haven. He said mass at the Farrell residence, also on Middle Street. By 1835, the rector of the New Haven church estimated there were 720 Catholics in Fairfield County, with Bridgeport home of the largest community, about 100 people. McDermot was followed by James Smyth, also from New Haven.

In 1842, St. James the Apostle Church, an Irish parish, was dedicated by Bishop Benedict Fenwick of Boston in Bridgeport. The town then had a population of about 250 Catholics. The pastor was also responsible for ministering to the small Catholic communities in Derby and Norwalk. Catholics in Stamford, Greenwich and other towns were served by the pastor at St. James and by Jesuit priests based at Fordham College in New York City.

In 1843, Pope Gregory XVI split the Diocese of Hartford off from the Diocese of Boston. The new diocese consisted of all of Connecticut and Rhode Island. The Bridgeport area would remain part of the Diocese of Hartford for the next 110 years.

In 1844, Michael Lynch became the first resident priest in Bridgeport. His responsibilities included missions in Norwalk, Stamford, Danbury, Wolcottville, and Norfolk. St. John's Parish was erected in Stamford in 1847. With the influx of Irish immigrants in Danbury to work in the hat industry there, the diocese erected St. Peter's Parish in 1848.

=== 1850 to 1900 ===
The first Catholic church in Stamford, St. John's, was dedicated in 1851. Thomas Synnott, pastor of St. James Parish, established St. Mary's Parish for Irish immigrants in East Bridgeport in 1854. The first Catholic church in Greenwich, St. Paul, was opened in 1860, serving Irish immigrants in the area.

Synnott opened St. Augustine Parish for the Irish in Bridgeport in 1869. St. Mary's Parish in Greenwich, the first in that town, was founded in 1874. Another Irish parish, Sacred Heart, was organized in Bridgeport in 1883; until the church was ready for services, mass was held at the opera house. St. Michael's "Chapel of Ease" (run by Sacred Heart Parish) was constructed in Bridgeport in 1895; the Sisters of Mercy operated a school in the rear portion of the chapel. The diocese established several ethnic parishes in Bridgeport during this period:

- St. Joseph's (German, 1895)
- St. Anthony of Padua (French, 1894)
- St. Stephen of Hungary (Hungarian, 1897)

=== 1900 to 1960 ===
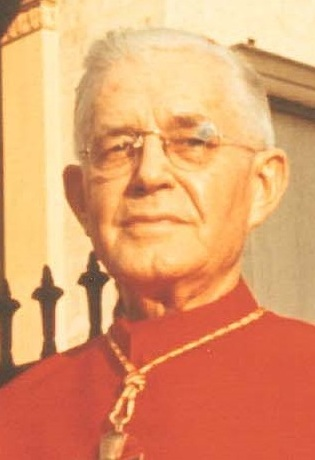
Cardinal Sheehan (2014)

The diocese in 1901 dedicated St. John Nepomucene in Bridgeport, making it the first Slovak church in New England.In 1905, the Sisters of Charity opened St. Vincent's Hospital in Bridgeport. Today it is St. Vincent's Medical Center.

Pope Pius XII erected the Diocese of Bridgeport on August 6, 1953, removing its territory from the Diocese of Hartford. The pope named Auxiliary Bishop Lawrence Shehan of Baltimore as the first bishop of Bridgeport.

During his tenure in Bridgeport, Shehan established 18 new parishes, built 24 new churches, and founded three high schools. He also formed a Catholic Youth Organization, promoted vocations to the priesthood and religious life, and began parish ministry for the increasing number of Hispanic, Portuguese, and Brazilian immigrants.

=== 1960 to 1970 ===
In 1960, Shehan convoked the first synod of Bridgeport to complete the initial organization of the diocese and to establish a uniform code of practice and discipline for the clergy. Shehan was named archbishop of Baltimore by Pope John XXIII in 1961.

John XXIII named Auxiliary Bishop Walter Curtis of the Archdiocese of Newark as the next bishop of Bridgeport in 1961. In 1962, St. Joseph High School in Trumbull and Immaculate High School in Danbury were founded.

Curtis spent most of his administration implementing the reforms of the Second Vatican Council of the early 1960s.In 1963, Curtis opened Sacred Heart College in Fairfield to serve students of all religions, races and ethnic backgrounds. Today it is Sacred Heart University. In 1964, the diocese opened Notre Dame Girls' High School in Bridgeport and Notre Dame Boys' High School in Fairfield.

=== 1970 to 2000 ===
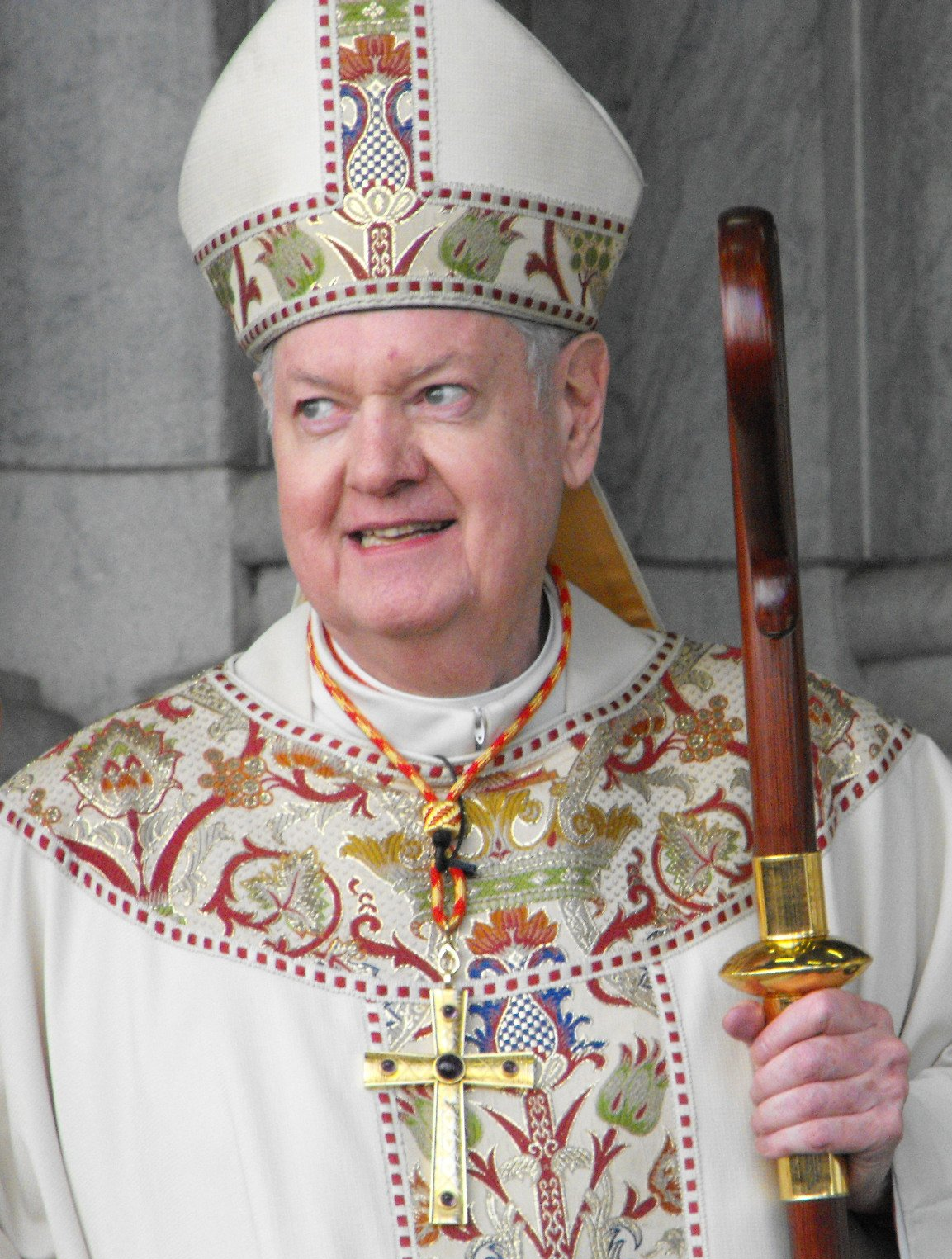
Cardinal Egan (2009)

During the 1970s, Curtis oversaw the renovation of St. Augustine Cathedral and its re-dedication in 1979. He established two nursing homes: Pope John Paul II Health Care Center in Danbury and St. Camillus Health Care Center in Stamford Kolbe Cathedral High School was founded in Bridgeport in 1976. During this period, the Catholic population in the diocese increased from 286,000 to 300,000. Curtis also founded the Fairfield Foundation, a nondenominational group that helps people in need in the county. Curtis retired as bishop of Bridgeport in 1988.

Pope John Paul II named Auxiliary Bishop Edward Egan of the Archdiocese of New York as the next bishop of Bridgeport in 1988. During his tenure, Egan oversaw the reorganization of Catholic schools. He also raised $45 million for diocesan schools through a fundraising campaign, "Faith in the Future." The diocesan Catholic Charities under his tenure became the largest private social service agency in the county. To support the 12 Hispanic parishes in the diocese, he brought Spanish-speaking priests to Bridgeport from Colombia. Egan also established a home for retired priests and a school for children with special needs.

=== 2000 to present ===
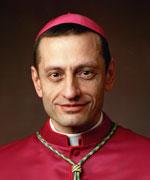
Bishop Caggiano (2008)

After John Paul II named Egan as archbishop of New York, the pope in 2001 appointed Auxiliary Bishop William E. Lori from the Archdiocese of Washington as the new bishop of Bridgeport. While serving in Bridgeport, Lori refused to release the names of diocesan priests who were being sued for sexual abuse of minors. The US Supreme Court ruled against Lori in 2009 and the diocese was forced to release the names. In 2009, Pope Benedict XVI elevated St. John's Church in Stamford, constructed in 1875, to the Basilica of Saint John the Evangelist. Benedict XVI named Lori as archbishop of Baltimore in 2012.

Auxiliary Bishop Frank Caggiano of the Diocese of Brooklyn was appointed bishop of Bridgeport by Benedict XVI in 2012. One of Caggiano's first actions as bishop was to publicly announce the financial deficit incurred before his installation. He mandated that pastors serve six-year renewable periods at parishes and required that they submit their resignations when they turned 75.

In 2014, Caggiano convoked the 4th Synod of the Diocese of Bridgeport, the first in 32 years (themed "Building Bridges to the Future Together"). In interview that year with America Magazine, Caggiano said that one of his first priorities as bishop was reaching out to the high percentage of Catholics in the diocese who no longer attend mass. One of the major concerns of the synod was the decline in mass attendance and sacramental reception, along with the need to bolster Catholic schools due to declining enrollment.

In 2018, Caggiano announced the revision of the liturgical norms and regulations in the diocese over the next four-year period, stemming from discussions in the diocesan synod. Caggiano said that these newer regulations would "allow us to pray effectively and reverently as a Church" and would be the newest norms implemented since 1983. As of 2026, Caggiano is the bishop of Bridgeport.

==== Reports of sex abuse ====
In 1993, 23 lawsuits were filed against the Diocese of Bridgeport, alleging sexual abuse by priests. The diocese settled all 23 claims in 2001. Five priests were suspended from the ministry.

Kieran Ahearn, pastor of St. Mary's Parish in Bethel, was arrested in 1993 on charges of indecent assault on a minor during a ski trip to the Berkshire Mountains in Massachusetts. Ahearn was acquitted of sexual abuse, but convicted of contributing to the delinquency of a minor. He was sentenced to two years of probation.

In 2001, John J. Castaldo, pastor of St. Maurice Parish in Stamford, was charged in White Plains, New York, with the attempted dissemination of indecent material to a minor. He was accused of sending sexually explicit messages to a police investigator posing as a 14-year-old boy. He pleaded guilty and received one weekend in jail and five years of probation.

The priest Paul Gotta was arrested in 2013 and charged with sexually abusing a teenage boy. He forced the boy to strip naked and performed sexual acts on him. The sexual abuse charges were dropped. The diocese removed Gotta from ministry in 2013. In 2017, Gotta was convicted of having another teenage boy purchase thousands of rounds of handgun ammunition and giving that boy explosives. Gotta was sentenced to nine months in prison.

In May 2014, Bishop Caggiano removed John Stronkowski from his post as pastor at St. Margaret Mary Alacoque Church in Shelton, citing absenteeism. He was not re-assigned to another post. In June 2016, citing credible accusations of sexual abuse, Caggiano suspended Stronkowski from ministry.In November 2014, the diocese revealed a list of 14 clergy with credible accusations of sexual abuse of children.

In 2018, the diocese released a report of financial settlements with abuse victims. The majority of the cost of settlements (approximately 92%) was provided through the sale of diocesan property, insurance recoveries and other co-defendants. The diocese paid approximately $52.5 million to settle 156 abuse cases dating back to 1953. In March 2019, ten additional names were later added to the original 2014 list.

In October 2019, former Connecticut Superior Court Judge Robert Holzberg released the results of his investigation, commissioned by Caggiano, into the diocese's handling of accusations of sexual abuse by its priests. Holzberg found that Bishops Shehan, Curtis, and Egan consistently failed to fulfill their responsibilities. Holzberg described Egan as taking a "dismissive, uncaring, and at times threatening attitude toward survivors"; he characterized Egan's behavior as "profoundly unsympathetic, inadequate, and inflammatory". Holzberg's report accused 71 priests of sexually abusing 300 children since 1953. However, the report praised the reforms made by Bishops Lori and Caggiano to combat sex abuse; Holzberg compared their tenures to that of their three predecessors as "a tale of two cities."

In 2020, Jaime Marin-Cordona, pastor of Our Lady of Guadalupe Parish in Danbury, was arrested and charged with three counts of fourth-degree sexual assault, three counts of risk of injury to child and three counts of illegal sexual contact. In 2022, Marin-Cordona was convicted of sexual assault and sentenced to one year in state prison.

== Bishops ==
=== Bishops of Bridgeport ===
1. Lawrence Shehan (1953–1961), appointed Coadjutor Archbishop of Baltimore and subsequently succeeded to that see, created cardinal in 1965
2. Walter William Curtis (1961–1988)
3. Edward Egan (1988–2000), appointed Archbishop of New York and created cardinal in 2001
4. William E. Lori (2001–2012), appointed Archbishop of Baltimore
5. Frank J. Caggiano (2013–present)

== Education ==
As of 2026, the Diocese of Bridgeport has five high schools and 26 elementary schools. Two of the high schools and four of the elementary schools are independently-operated. The total enrollment in all the schools is approximately 9,000 students.

=== High Schools ===
- Cardinal Kung High School – Stamford
- Fairfield College Preparatory School – Fairfield (independent)
- Immaculate High School – Danbury
- Kolbe Cathedral Preparatory School – Bridgeport
- Notre Dame Prep of Sacred Heart University – Fairfield (independent)
- St. Joseph High School – Trumbull

== Social services ==
=== Elderly ===
The Diocese of Bridgeport sponsors nursing homes in Danbury, Stamford, and Trumbull It also operates eight Bishop Curtis Homes for the elderly in Bethel, Danbury, Greenwich, Stamford, Fairfield, and Bridgeport.

=== Catholic Charities ===
"Catholic Charities of Fairfield County, with 25 program offices throughout the county, provides the largest private network of social services in southwestern Connecticut," according to the diocese.
