= Don Megerle =

American swimming coach (born 1947)

Don R. Megerle
- As Bethany College swimmer in 1966

Biographical details
- Born: January 30, 1947 (age 79); Rochester, New York, U.S.
- Education: Bethany College

Playing career
- 1966–1970: Bethany College; Coach Tom Grall
- Positions: breaststroke individual medley

Coaching career (HC unless noted)
- 1970–1971: Springfield College; Asst. Coach
- 1971–2004: Tufts University; Swimming and Diving

Head coaching record
- Overall: 268–81 (Tufts); Percentage – .768

Accomplishments and honors

Awards
- 7 x NE/NESCAC Coach of the Year; ISHOF Dick Steadman Award '91 '07 CSCAA Colleg. & Scholastic Trophy; CSCAA 100 Greatest Swim Coaches of the Century

Donald R. Megerle, a competitive swimmer at Bethany College, was a long-serving coach of the men's swimming team at Tufts University, a Division III New England Small College Athletic Conference school. In his 33 years as Tufts Head Coach from 1971 to 2004, he led the team to an overall record of 268–81, producing 92 Division III All-American swimmers, and 2 National champions.

== Early swimming ==
Don Megerle was born on January 30, 1947, in Rochester, New York. At 13 in 1960, he swam and won events for Rochester's Central YMCA as part of their Junior swimming team. That year he came within 1 second of breaking a pool record swimming the Medley Relay, and he would continue to win events in freestyle, butterfly and breaststroke as a young swimmer. Continuing to show stroke diversity as a 14-year-old youth swimming for Midvale, he won three events in three separate strokes at Rochester, New York's Oak Hill Country Club Invitational; the 50 yard butterfly, the 50 yard backstroke, and the 100 yard freestyle. His ability to gain efficiency in multiple strokes would become a great asset later in his coaching career when he helped his swimmers improve their stroke technique.

== High school, College, and first coaching job ==
=== Irondequoit High School ===
He was a graduate of Rochester, New York's Irondequoit High School where he swam competitively. Swimming the breaststroke leg, he helped set an Irondequoit pool record for the Indians in January 1965 in the 200 Medley Relay with a combined team time of 1:50.6.

=== Bethany College ===
Megerle swam for the Bethany College Bisons, a small Liberal Arts College with Division III sports in rural West Virginia. At Bethany, he specialized in the breaststroke under Coach Tom Grall, who had previously coached at Irondequoit High. Bethany placed first in the President's Athletic Conference Swim Championship at Case Western Reserve in Cleveland during Megerle's Freshman year. Megerle swam at Bethany during the tenure of six-time All-American backstroker Wes Anderson who won All America honors in the Medley Relay on three occasions between 1967 and 1968 as well as in the 100 and 200 back. Two former members of his High School swim team also swam for Bethany, having been recruited by Grall, one of whom was Bruce Kepplar who was team captain from 1967 to 1968.

=== First coaching job ===
After college, Megerle was briefly an Assistant Coach at Springfield College under International Hall of Fame Coach Charles Silvia, who Megerle considered a valuable mentor. A significant influence in his coaching career, Megerle believed "Silvia taught me how to handle people and get the most out of them...I owe him a great deal...there are 45 coaches in the country who served under him at one time".

== Coaching at Tufts ==
When former Tufts Swim Coach Edward Reed left for Brown University in the Spring of 1971, Megerle was hired in his mid-20's as a replacement by Tufts Athletic Director Rocco "Rocky" Carzo, largely over the phone according to Megerle. Reed, who had coached swimming at Tufts since 1966, would excel as a Brown University Swimming and Water Polo Coach. Director Carzo believed Megerle could be a long-term asset to the Tufts Community.

After a losing season in 1973, Megerle turned around a small struggling team, and had a notable winning season by 1975 with a record of 11–2 in dual meets. A skilled recruiter, Megerle's 1977 Swim Team had five Division III Swimming all Americans, winning 22 of 26 meets, with all five All-Americans returning in 1978. By 1984, the Tufts Team had enjoyed ten consecutive winning seasons, a remarkable transformation from 1950 to 1969 when the team failed to have a single season with more wins than losses. As a Division III NCAA team which could not offer scholarships to recruit swimmers, Tufts was still able to establish itself as a top New England swimming program. Tufts swimmers were attracted to the team and motivated to work harder as a result of the individual attention Megerle gave each team member.

In the 1980s Tufts Swimming was strengthened by the NESCAC conference refocusing their emphasis to centralize management of the Colleges in their conference to focus on sports other than football. Conference administrators began to see athletic programs as "crucial extracurricular activities", that could complement rather than diminish the critical place of academics.

Word of mouth and skilled recruiting continued to attract top swimmers to the program. Pete Coassin was a 1980 four-time Division III All-America swimmer, who helped lead Tufts to a 36–5 dual meet record during his four years on the team from 1979 to 1982. In 1985, Megerle coached three-time All-American Jim Wong, a 1986 Team Co-Captain, who Megerle believed "had a good chance of becoming the best swimmer Tufts ever produced". Four other All-America performing swimmers were on the 1985 team. One of Tufts former superstars, Jim Lilley, 1982 Division III 100 yard Fly National Champion, who specialized in the butterfly from 1979 to 1982 became an All-American in 12 events, set four Tufts records and one national record. Mark Benvenuti, a 1996 All-American in the 200 Medley Relay, became a swim coach.

In Megerle's last five years of coaching from 1999 to 2004, the team had a 39–7 dual meet record. Megerle's teams earned an overall meet record in his 33-year tenure of 268–81.

== Coaching focus and philosophy ==
Skilled at keeping his teams at Tufts happy while motivated and focused, in 1998 he wrote "To perform well at any level, the athlete must understand that stressful thoughts create muscular tension that eventually interferes with your freedom of motion". To some swimmers Megerle's 5' 3" stature may have made him a little less imposing than former coaches.

Megerle could be tough, but tried to never push too hard. He has said "Practice is important, but I believe swimming is more psychological than anything else. I want my guys to be in their best frame of mind before a meet. That way they'll give me their best performance". Confirming Megerle's focus, in 1977 Division III All-American swimmer Dave Linstedt said,"You have to credit the coach for our success. In my case he just talks to me before a race, and he gets me in the right frame of mind. Than I do better than I thought I would." All-American Dan Whalen best expressed Megerle's ability to individualize coaching and focus on the unique skill of each of his swimmers, crediting the coach's low key program for his own success and noted, "Coach Megerle changed my style completely, he made me a swimmer; he is the only one who has ever worked with my style and stroke".

== Meet coordinator ==
Megerle was known as an able coordinator for NCAA Championship meets, making him particularly valuable in the competitive swimming community. In 1982, he was appointed as a member of the NCAA Men's Swimming Committee. In March 1989 he acted as a co-director with Sue Peterson of Merchant Marine Academy for the NCAA Division III Swimming and Diving Championships in Orlando, and in 1990 was a coordinator for the Division I NCAA Men's Championship in Indianapolis. During his 30-year coaching career, he had the patience, dedication, and work ethic to successfully administer 32 NCAA Division I Men's Championships, 28 NCAA Division III men's meets, and 22 NCAA Division III Women's events.

== After coaching swimming ==
After his long tenure as Swimming and Diving Coach, Megerle served as Director of the Tufts University President's Marathon Challenge, where he inspired hundreds of Tufts Students and alumni to train and compete in the challenging event. He coached Track and Golf during his tenure, taught swimming at Pine Knoll Swim School, founded in 1958 by Coach Charles Silvia who mentored him when he coached swimming at Springfield College in 1970. Megerle later worked as the staff host for the Tufts Travel-Learn Iceland Reykjavik Marathon and 2007 NOVA Marathon Documentary. Megerle's 2004 replacement, Coach Adam Hoyt, built on Megerle's legacy. The Tufts Jumbos Men's Swim Team continually placed high in conference standings, and won the NESCAC conference in 2018, led by Engineering student swimmers Roger Gu and Michael Manfre, though Megerle had stepped down as Head Coach over a decade earlier. The women's team, also coached by Hoyt, recently won their first NESCAC conference in 2022.

== Honors ==
Well recognized in New England, Megerle was a seven-time New England or NESAC Coach of the Year. As the first recipient, he was awarded the International Swimming Hall of Fame Dick Steadman Award in 1991, as a coach "who had done the most to spread happiness in the sport." Megerle's swimmers knew their Coach's light touch and sense of humor could reduce tension during tough meets.

In 2007, the College Swimming Coaches' Athletic Association (CSCAA) awarded him the Collegiate & Scholastic Trophy, an award given to the coach who judged by his peers in coaching, has made "the greatest contribution to swimming as a competitive sport, and as a healthful, recreational activity in the province of undergraduate and scholastic education.” Most impressively, the CSCAA later listed him as one of the "100 Greatest Swim Coaches of the last 100 years". As expected in 2023, he was inducted into the Tufts University Athletic Hall of Fame.
