= Middletown Public Schools =

Middletown Public School District or Middletown Public Schools may refer to:

- Middletown Public Schools (Connecticut)
- Middletown Public Schools (Rhode Island)
- Middletown Township Public School District, New Jersey
