= Carl Samuelson =

Carl Samuelson may refer to:

- Carl Samuelson (American football)
- Carl Samuelson (swim coach)
