= Bob Carpenter Center =

Arena in Delaware, United States

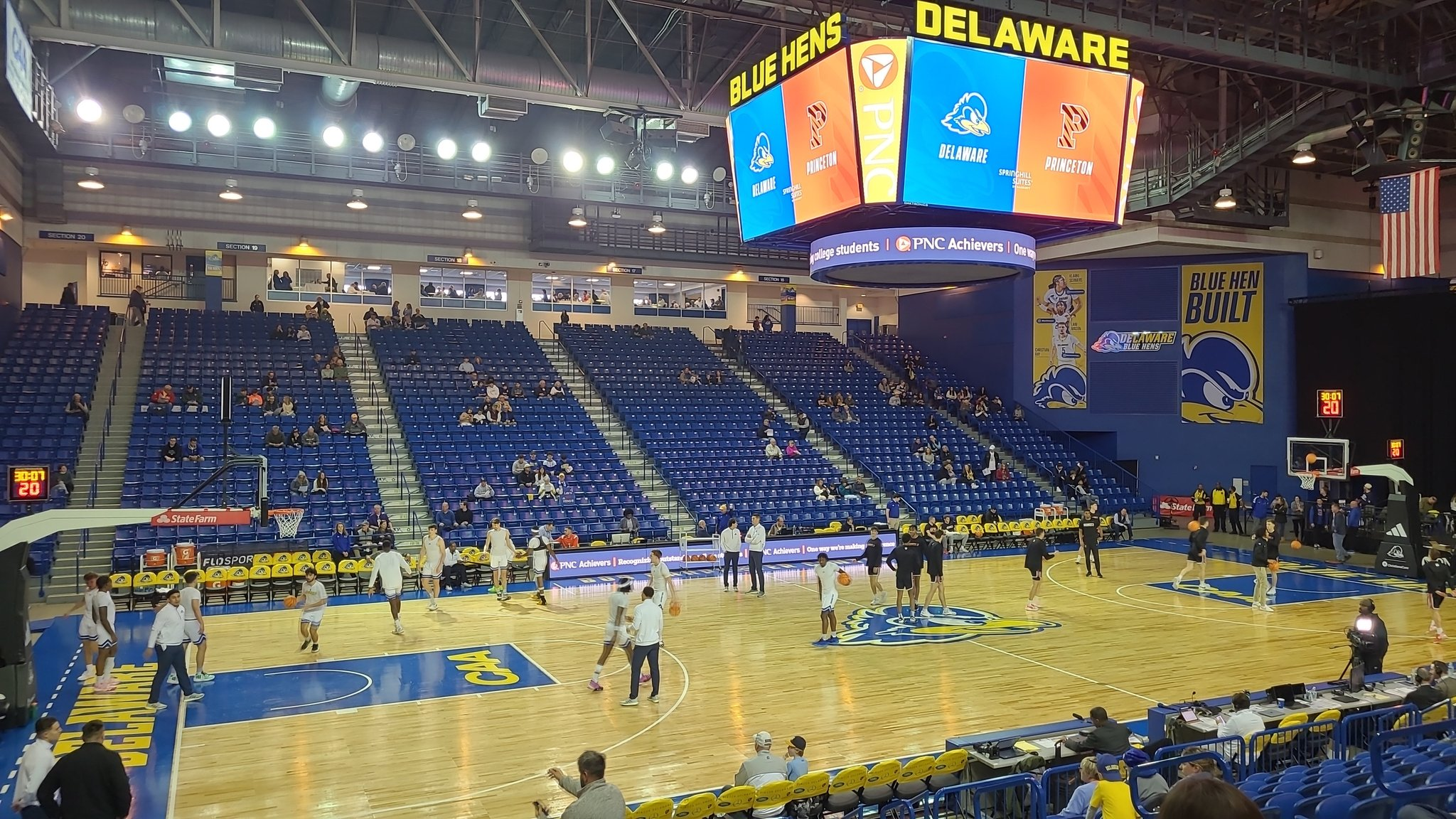
- Interactive map of Bob Carpenter Center
- Address: 631 South College Avenue
- Location: Newark, Delaware
- Coordinates: 39°39′38.0″N 75°44′55.1″W
- Owner: University of Delaware
- Capacity: 5,000
- Surface: Hardwood
- Public transit: DART First State bus: 16, 33, 46, 302

Construction
- Opened: 1992
- Architect: HOK Sport

Tenants
- Delaware Fightin' Blue Hens (NCAA); Men's basketball (1992–present); Women's basketball (1992–present); Delaware 87ers (NBA G League) (2013–2018)

Bob Carpenter Center is a 5,000-seat multi-purpose arena, in Newark, Delaware, named in honor of benefactor and trustee, R. R. M. Carpenter Jr. (1915–1990). Students at the University of Delaware have nicknamed it "The Bob."

== History ==
As UD athletic director from 1984 to 2009, Edgar N. Johnson oversaw construction of the Carpenter Center, intending it to eventually serve as the new home for UD's men and women's basketball.

The arena opened in 1992 and was designed by HOK Sport (now known as Populous), who have been involved in more than 150 sports and recreation projects. The construction of the building cost $20.5 million. In late 2010, the university constructed an addition, which includes two full-size basketball courts, new offices and locker rooms for the basketball and volleyball programs, and a new entrance plaza.

The arena section of the building is named in honor of Frank E. Acierno, a local businessman and developer, who donated $1 million to the Bob Carpenter Center, the largest gift from a single donor.

It is home to the university of Delaware Blue Hens men's and women's basketball teams (men and women), and from 2013 to 2018, the Delaware 87ers (now the Delaware Blue Coats) of the NBA G League. It has also hosted a preseason game between the Philadelphia 76ers and the Boston Celtics. Since 2014, it has hosted one annual WNBA preseason game, except in 2017. Each of the WNBA games has featured UD product Elena Delle Donne, who was with the Chicago Sky from 2013 to 2016 and has been with the Washington Mystics since 2017.

== Notable events ==
It hosted a campaign rally for Vice President Al Gore in 1996 and all or part of America East Conference men's basketball tournaments from 1997 to 2001.

It also hosts other events, such as the WWE, music and comedy concerts, and craft fairs.

== See also ==
- List of NCAA Division I basketball arenas
