= Charles Butt (swim coach) =

American swimming coach (1925–2018

Charles J. Butt

Biographical details
- Born: May 19, 1925; Shanghai, China
- Died: September 14, 2018 (aged 93); Brunswick, Maine
- Education: Springfield College 1953; MS Springfield

Playing career
- 1950–1953: Springfield College; Swimming, Soccer, Tennis, Volleyball; Swim Coach Charles Silvia
- Positions: Sprint freestyle Soccer halfback, center forward

Coaching career (HC unless noted)
- 1953–1956: Springfield College; Asst. Coach, Freshman Coach
- 1961–1984: Bowdoin College; Men's Soccer
- 1961–2000: Bowdoin College; Men's Swim Coach
- 1976–2002: Bowdoin College; Women's Swim Coach

Head coaching record
- Overall: 132-65 .67 Winning % (Bowdoin Women's Swimming); 98 Wins (Bowdoin Men's Swimming); 120 Wins (Bowdoin Men's Soccer)

Accomplishments and honors

Championships
- New England Championships (Bowdoin Swimming, Men 2nd & Women 1st); Maine IAAC State Championship (Bowdoin Men's Soccer)

Awards
- National Collegiate and Scholastic Swimming Trophy '81 (Bowdoin Swimming); Richard E. Steadman Award '94 (Bowdoin Swimming); New England Swim Coaches Coach of the Year '76 '82 '88 '90; Bowdoin Hall of Fame '03; CSCAA Coach of the Century

Charles J. Butt (1925–September 14, 2018) was an American swimming coach who competed in swimming, tennis, and soccer for Springfield College and coached men's swimming at Bowdoin College for 39 years from 1961 to 2000. He led the Bowdoin men's swimming teams to several second-place finishes in the New England Swimming and Diving Championships, and after founding the women's team in 1976, led them to their first team victory in the New England Championships around 1989. Wide-ranging in his command of sports management, he coached men's soccer at Bowdoin through 1984, where he led the men's team to Maine Intercollegiate Athletic Association titles in 1965–6, and 1968. In his retirement, he served as an Assistant Coach for the Bowdoin Women's Squash team and excelled as a participant in the sport himself.

Charles Butt was born a Portuguese citizen on May 19, 1925, in Shanghai, China to Joseph P. and Lindamira Martins Butt, parents of mixed Chinese and Portuguese decent. In 1941, he was a graduate of the Western District Public School, and later studied for two years at Shanghai's St. John's University, before the WWII era Japanese occupation caused the school to close. With most courses taught in English, St. John's was recognized by many American Universities with a registration in Washington, D.C., and students could often become accepted to American graduate schools upon graduation. In his youth, he was active at the Shanghai YMCA where he excelled in basketball, swimming, cricket, track & field, handball, tennis, water polo, softball, soccer, bowling, and boxing. Around the WWII era, he worked several jobs, including work as an oiler on a Danish ship, before returning to Shanghai after the war. Resuming his athletic career, he was selected as a member of China's national basketball team and captured national swimming records in the 50-yard, 100-yard, and 100-meter freestyles. Though he qualified to participate in basketball and swimming for China in the 1948 London Olympic Games, he was barred from participating when he refused to relinquish his Portuguese passport as required by the Chinese government.

== Springfield College ==
Departing Shanghai for America on a British ship in 1951, he reached Hong Kong, and then Tokyo where he obtained a U.S. visa to attend Springfield College where he had been accepted prior to WWII. He arrived in America and began at Springfield around April 1951. Butt would graduate from Springfield cum laude in 1953, serving as President of the College Cosmopolitan Club, and serving as a community speaker on several occasions on the conditions in Shanghai under the Chinese Communist government. A talented multi-sport athlete at Springfield, he was an All-American honoree in soccer in 1952-3 under Coach Irv Schmid, and captained both the swim and tennis teams. In his first year of playing, the Springfield volleyball team won the national championship. Playing soccer for Springfield in the 1951–2 years he started and scored as halfback but improved his scoring when switched to Center and Center Forward and scored in a number of games, making all four goals in a winning match against Williams College in November 1951. Butt made All New England as a Springfield Soccer Halfback in 1951.

While Butt excelled as a freestyle sprinter on Springfield's winning swim team, he was complimented on Springfield's team by 1956 Olympic gold medalist William Yorzyk who excelled in several events, particularly butterfly. By January, 1952, Butt was part of a 4x100 freestyle relay team that held a school record of 3:38.1. Springfield swimming was managed by Hall of Fame Head Coach Charles Silvia, and Assistant Coach William Campbell. Silvia had a PHd in Exercise physiology and was the author of a number of widely respected books on swimming technique and ergonomics. An important life mentor, Silvia and wife Ruth would sponsor Charlie when he officially became an American citizen.

In the Fall of 1953, Butt coached Freshman swimming at Springfield and served as a Physical Education instructor in swimming, tennis, and soccer. He continued to coach swimming at Springfield for four years, through around 1956. In July 1957, he coached at an annual four-day summer swimming program to be held at Springfield along with Springfield Coach Charles Silvia, and Springfield swimmer and 1956 Melbourne Olympic gold medalist Bill Yorzyk.

In 1953, Butt spent the summer as Director of Aquatics at Locust Valley, New York's Piping Rock Club where he taught water safety, swimming and diving to many generations of familys for over fifty consecutive summers.

After serving as an Assistant swimming coach at Springfield, Butt spent a few years coaching soccer beginning around 1957 at Nassau County, New York's Roslyn High School before beginning his long coaching assignment at Bowdoin College. To stay current in the sport, Butt played semi-professional soccer in the Long Island Soccer League while at Rosslyn.

== Bowdoin swim and soccer coach ==
After accepting a position coaching soccer and swimming at Bowdoin College, replacing former Head Coach Bob Miller in 1961, Butt's first year men's swim team had an undefeated record, and later finished as a runner-up at the New England Championships. Butt credited Miller with the quality of his first team and their exceptional drive. By March, 1962, the Men's Swimming team had won all eight dual meets, set five new Bowdoin records, and had the most wins of any Bowdoin swim team in the school's history. In March 1962, school swimming records were broken in the individual medley, the 220 and 440-yard freestyle, and the 100-yard butterfly. One of Butt's early swimmers, Jim Coots, of the Class of 1963 placed second in the National Modern Pentathlon contest in 1965. Butt led the men's team to four New England Swimming and Diving Championship runner-up finishes in his career. He coached the women's swim team in their inaugural year of 1976–7, and led them to win the New England Championship by the late 1980s. Butt had a noteworthy career record of 132–65 in women's dual swim meets and a total of 198 career wins with the men's team. One of his more outstanding swimmers at Bowdoin was Lissa McGrath of the class of 1983, who won three national titles. In the 1980s, Butt oversaw the construction of the new 16-lane LeRoy Greason pool, built during the presidency of Bowdoin's President A. Leroy Greason. During his thirty-nine year tenure, he led over fifty of his Bowdoin swimmers to receive All-American recognition. Throughout his coaching career, in both soccer and swimming as many as 100 of his athletes received All-American honors. He retired from coaching swimming at Bowdoin in 2000.

Butt coached Bowdoin men's soccer for twenty-three years from 1961 to 1984, leading the team to an unprecedented 128 victories, and Maine Intercollegiate Athletic Association titles in 1965–6, and 1968. Important contributors on the 1966 Maine IAA championships soccer team included Halfback Bill Miles, a 1966 All Maine Soccer Squad Member, speedy Wing Jeff Richards, a 1966 second team All-Maine Soccer honoree, and Charlie Powell, a fullback, who was a member of the 1966 All Maine Soccer Squad and a key defensive player who received the George Levine annual soccer trophy. Key contributors for Bowdoin in the 1968 Maine Soccer championship were fullback H. Rollin Ives, and forward Stephen Lang who would both serve as Co-captains. Bowdoin men's soccer won the 1968 State title with a 4–0–2 record in the IAA State championship matches, finishing with a tie against Colby that was enough to clinch the title. By September 1969, Butt served as President of the New England Intercollegiate Soccer League.

Around 1966–1967, Butt did additional graduate work at Columbia University teacher's college, and may have studied there earlier as well.

In 1965, he married Patricia C. McCallum, later known as Brigit P. McCallum of North Waterboro, Maine. The couple had two children, Charles Jr. and Catie. In the 1970s, he had Cynthia Osgood as his partner, and they would later travel widely. In his 40's he renewed his love of the game of squash which he had Assistant Coached at Bowdoin, eventually winning 23 national championships and a world championship.

== Service to Intercollegiate athletics ==
Butt authored a variety of publications on both soccer and swimming. From 1961 to 1968, he was on the Rules Committee of the National Collegiate Athletic Association (NCAA) Swimming and Diving Committee, and served as chairman for four years. He was an active member of the American Association for Health, Recreation, and Physical Education and the National Soccer Coaches Association. He was an executive member of the Soccer Coaches Association in Nassau County, and an executive officer for the New England Intercollegiate Swimming Association, and the New England Intercollegiate Soccer League.

Butt died at 93 at his home in South Harpwell, Brunswick, Maine on September 14, 2018. A memorial was held on the morning of October 5, 2018 at Bowdoin College's Farley Field House, in Brunswick, Maine.

== Honors ==
Butt was widely recognized for his coaching achievements in his career, particularly by the swimming community. In 1981, his twentieth year as coach, he was a recipient of the National Collegiate and Scholastic Swimming Trophy, considered the highest honor in intercollegiate swimming and diving, given to a coach making the greatest contribution to the sport of swimming as a part of undergraduate education. He was a four-time New England Swimming Coaches Association (NESCA) coach of the year in 1976, 1982, 1988 and 1990. In 1989, he was awarded NESCA men's coach of the year honors. He received the 1994 Richard E. Steadman Award from the College Swimming Coaches Association (CSCAA) and International Swimming Hall of Fame. In 2010, he became a member of the Maine Swimming and Diving Hall of Fame. In 2003, he was inducted into the Bowdoin College Athletic Hall of Honor. A Bowdoin scholarship in his name was created upon his retirement in 2000. In a distinctive honor, he was a CSCAA Swim Coach of the Century.
