= Middletown High School (Connecticut) =

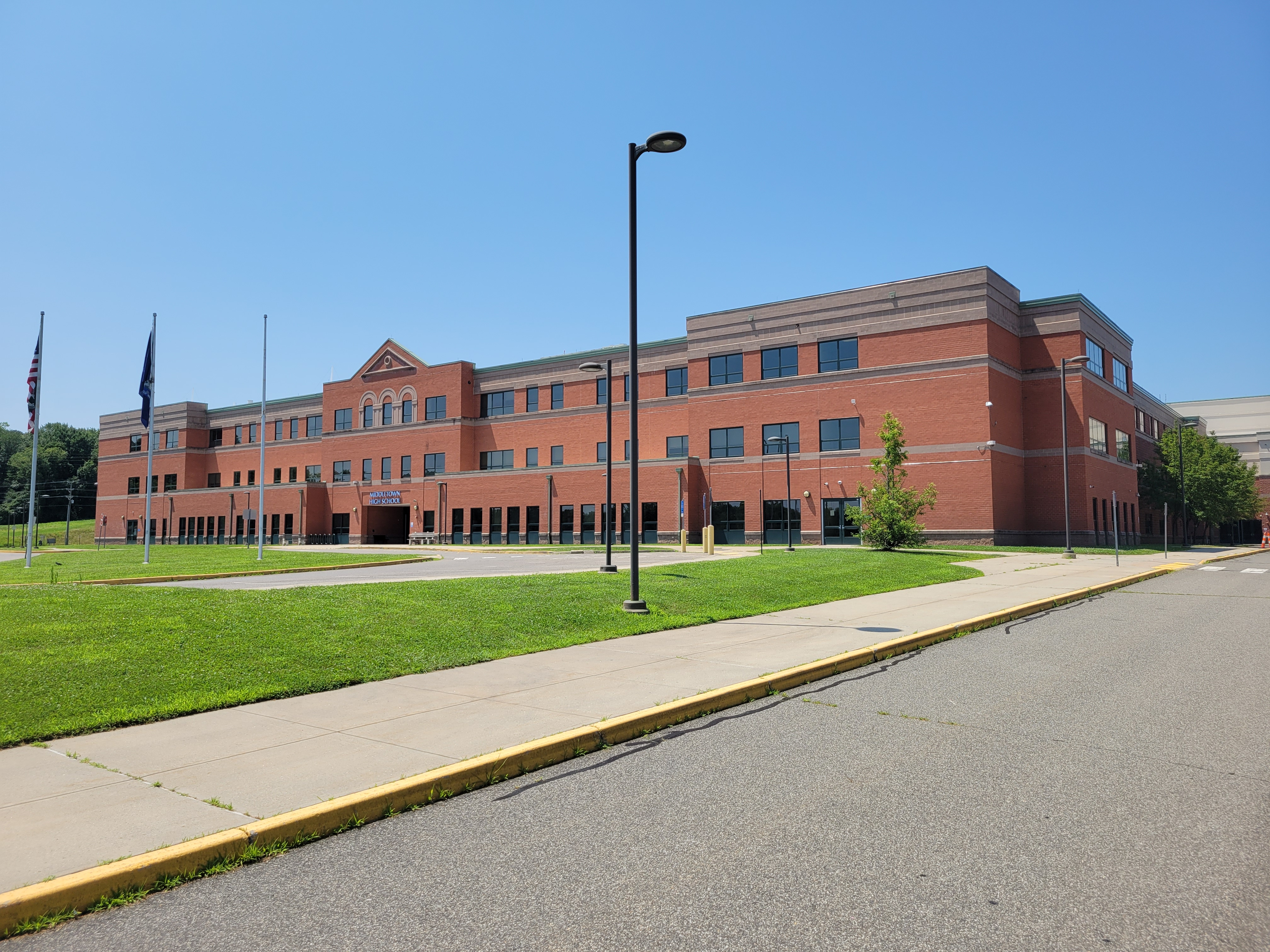
- Middletown High School

Location
- 200 LaRosa Lane; Middletown, Connecticut 06457; United States; 41°34′38″N 72°41′02″W

Information
- Type: Public high school
- Established: 1840 (186 years ago)
- School district: Middletown Public Schools
- Superintendent: Joseph Macary
- CEEB code: 070400
- Principal: Dawn Brooks
- Grades: 9-12
- Enrollment: 1,193 (2024–2025)
- Campus type: Suburban
- Colors: Navy and Columbia blue
- Mascot: Blue Dragon
- Newspaper: MHS Blue Prints
- Yearbook: The Lair
- Website: mhs.middletownschools.org

Middletown High School (MHS) is a public high school located in Middletown, Connecticut, United States. It is a part of Middletown Public Schools.

== Athletics ==
Athletic activities include football, volleyball, cross country, crew, swimming and diving, cheerleading, soccer, basketball, wrestling, baseball, softball, track, tennis, golf, and ultimate Frisbee.

Wins in CIAC State Championships
| Sport | Class | Year(s) |
|---|---|---|
| Baseball | L | 1991 |
| Basketball (boys) | M | 1964, 1968, 1969, 1976, 1977, 1978 |
| Basketball (boys) | L | 1994 |
| Cross country (boys) | MM | 1992 |
| Dance | HipHop Large | 2012, 2026 |
| Dance | HipHop Small | 2013 |
| Dance | Jazz Small | 2013, 2026 |
| Football | M-II | 1984 |
| Football | MM | 1987 |
| Football | M | 1992 |
| Softball | M | 1992 |
| Swimming (boys) | M | 1993 |
| Track and field (indoor, boys) | S | 1998 |
| Track and field (indoor, boys) | M | 1951, 1952, 1953, 1954 |
| Track and field (outdoor, boys) | S | 1973 |
| Track and field (outdoor, boys) | MM | 1998, 1999, 2000, 2007 |
| Track and field (outdoor, boys) | M | 1941, 1943, 1947, 1950, 1953 (Co-champions with Killingly), 1954, 1963, 1966, 1977, 1978, 1979 |
| Track and field (outdoor, girls) | L | 2017 |
| Wrestling (boys) | L | 2007, 2008 |

== Notable alumni ==
- Corny Thompson, former professional basketball player
- Nicholas Tucci, American actor
- Quentin Williams, Former State Representative
- Carl Samuelson, Williams College swim coach
