= Charles Silvia =

American swimmer and swim coach

Charles "Red" Silvia
- Coach Silvia between 1940–1970

Biographical details
- Born: January 3, 1911; Somerville, Massachusetts, U.S.
- Died: June 16, 1998 (aged 87); Springfield, Massachusetts, U.S.
- Education: Springfield College 1934 BA

Playing career
- 1929–1934: Springfield College
- Positions: Distance Freestyle, Individual Medley

Coaching career (HC unless noted)
- 1934–1937: The New Hampton School (Athletic Director, Coach)
- 1937–1978: Springfield College (Swimming Coach)
- 1944–1945: New Haven YMCA; Wilbraham Academy (Multi-sport coach)
- 1956: U.S. Olympic Team; Asst. Coach, Swimming

Head coaching record
- Overall: 214 Wins

Accomplishments and honors

Championships
- 10 New England Championships

Awards
- 1970 NCAA District 1 Coach of the Year; 1976 Springfield College Hall of Fame; 2002 ASCA Hall of Fame; 1976 International Swimming Hall of Fame; Collegiate & Scholastic Swim Trophy; CSCAA 100 Greatest Coaches of the Century

Charles Eaton "Red" Silvia was an All-American competitive swimmer for Springfield College, and a Hall of Fame swimming coach for Springfield from 1937 through 1978 where he led his teams to ten New England Intercollegiate Championships. A 1956 Assistant Olympic swimming coach, he was an outstanding contributor to the swimming community and served as President of the College Swimming Coaches Association of America, as well as chairing the Board of the International Swimming Hall of Fame. He authored seven books on swimming, Life Saving, and Scuba Diving, and was best known for his book, Life Saving and Water Safety Today.

== Education ==
Silvia was born January 3, 1911, in Sommerville, Massachusetts, outside of Boston to Anthony B. and Jane Kemp Silvia. He grew up in Haverhill, Massachusetts, and attended Haverhill High School, around 30 miles North of Boston, where he was honored in their Hall of Fame. Though he did not compete with a swimming team at Haverhill, he excelled and lettered in a variety of other sports including basketball, football, and baseball. He later attended the New Hampton School, a preparatory school in New Hampton, New Hampshire, where he was also active in athletics. At New Hampton, he received a medal for outstanding academic achievement, played basketball, and was Captain of New Hampton's football team in 1929.

He attended and swam for Springfield College from 1930 to 1934, where he received his bachelor's degree in 1934 and later completed a master's degree in Physical Education between 1937 and 1940 while serving his early years as the swimming coach for Springfield. As a Senior at Springfield, Silvia made the Kappa Delta Pi academic honorary society.

== Springfield College swimmer ==
While swimming for Springfield College, he won the New England Intercollegiate Championship in the 440-yard event in 1933, also known as the quarter mile, setting the 440-yard New England Conference record which he held for two years. In 1934, he retained his New England Swimming Association league record in the 440-yard swim with a time of 5.18.2 for the short pool, and 5:19.7 for the long pool course. Silvia's 440-yard record was broken in February 1935 by Springfield College swimmer C.F. Pawling who swam a new record time of 5:17.3. Silvia's fastest time in the 300 Individual Medley in 1934, was 4.00.8 for the short pool course, also a New England Swimming Association League record. Silvia may have also set a National Collegiate record in the 300-yard Individual Medley on March 3, 1933, at Springfield's McCurdy pool, with a time of 4:08.4 (prior record 4:08.6, 1930, by Yale swimmer J. W. Hart) though the record was not broken during an official meet, but rather in a match between Springfield's Varsity and Freshman teams. At least one reliable source, the International Swimming Hall of Fame Bio for Charles Silvia, referenced the 1933 300-yard IM swim as a national record.

Excelling in the longer freestyle competition as well, Silvia was a collegiate All-American in the 1500-meter event his Senior year in 1934 when he served as Captain for the Springfield College team. An open water distance swimming enthusiast, Silvia completed a two-hour swim from Hampton Beach to Salisbury Beach in early August, 1934, and planned an 11-mile swim from Hampton Beach to the Isles of Shoals.

Silvia swam under Coach Thomas K. Cureton, an honoree of the International Swimming Hall of Fame for his contributions to the science of physical fitness testing and research for swimmers as well as athletes in other sports. Cureton, widely published in his field, swam for and graduated Yale, obtained a PhD in educational research from Columbia in 1939, and later taught at the University of Illinois from 1941–1969. Cureton emphasized endurance training as being more valuable than mastering mechanical skills for athletes, which may have been one of his primary focuses in training his swimmers at Springfield, and became his lasting contribution to training athletes. As a Senior, Silvia's exceptionally strong 1934 team broke nearly all prior Springfield records. Silvia was considered one of Springfield's greatest endurance swimmers. As an outstanding contributor as a Senior, he scored the second highest number of combined dual meet points, for the 1934 season, a total of 76, out of a total of 421 scored by the entire Springfield team of 20 that year. His mastery of multiple strokes as a medley swimmer, would later benefit him as a swim coach. Possibly influencing his future choice of coaching swimming as a career, during summer breaks from Springfield College, Silvia worked as an Assistant swimming director at the Brimfield Red Cross Camp in the greater Springfield area.

Immediately after graduating Springfield College in 1934, Silvia worked for his former preparatory school, the New Hampton School in New Hampton, New Hampshire as Director of Athletics, continuing in the position through 1937. At New Hampton, he coached baseball, basketball, and soccer.

== Springfield College coach ==
A young Silvia circa 1937 as new Springfield Coach

He served as the swim coach at his former alma mater Springfield College, from the Fall of 1937 through 1978. He began graduate work at Springfield during his employment as swim coach in 1937. In his earliest years at Springfield, he helped administer physical fitness, nutrition, and swimming placement tests to new students, and taught the Theory and Practice of Swimming. Formerly a multisport athlete as a High School student, while at Springfield, in addition to swimming, he helped coach the football and baseball teams. One of his most outstanding successors as a Springfield College coach was Peter Avdoulos who coached the Springfield Diving Team from 1986 through around 2024, though Avdoulos dove for Springfield beginning in the mid-1980's shortly after Silvia's coaching tenure.

Silvia briefly coached and taught at other academic institutions between 1944 and 1945, when Springfield was forced to make cuts in their athletic programs during WWII. Beginning with a strong inaugural team at Springfield in 1937, he inherited several AAU and state champions, and after becoming a proficient recruiter of talent, he led the team to around ten New England Intercollegiate Championships during his coaching tenure, according to several sources, including his bio in the American Swimming Coaches Association Hall of Fame. Silvia is credited with coaching as many as 200 All America swimmers during his coaching career.

The Springfield Maroons swimmers won their first New England Championship in 1941, and captured seven consecutive championships between 1968 and 1974 as Silvia matured in his skills. In their sixth consecutive New England Intercollegiate Championship in 1973 held at Springfield's Linkletter Natatorium, Silvia's team won convincingly and scored 347 points to Williams 222 points, and Bowdoin Colleges's 221, winning by a 100-point margin for the third straight year. Silvia's teams had considerable depth in the early 1970's with contributions from many team members.

== New Haven Y, Wilbraham Academy Coach, 1943–1945 ==
Springfield cut back on its sports programs in 1943 due to WWII, which prompted Silvia to seek coaching work at other institutions. He served as the Associate physical education director of the New Haven Connecticut YMCA beginning in May 1944, where he coached varsity football and baseball. In May, 1945, he became head of Athletics and served as a Physics, Biology and Algebra instructor at Wilbraham Academy in Wilbraham, Massachusetts, about eight miles East of Springfield College. At Wilbraham, he also worked with the Wilbraham football players in the summer of 1945 and coached baseball. At the cessation of WWII, in February 1946, Silvia returned to Springfield College as assistant professor of Health and Physical Education, and head Swimming Coach.

Nationally recognized for his coaching skills, he was selected as an Assistant Coach at the 1956 Melbourne U.S. Olympic Swimming team, where the butterfly stroke was first included in competition. Silvia, in conjunction with other American swim coaches, worked hard to improve the efficiency of the new butterfly stroke in the 1950s, particularly the new dolphin kick, and American swimmers swept the women's 100-meter butterfly competition and took gold in the men's 200-meter butterfly event at the 1956 Olympic games.

In 1958, he founded the Pine Knoll Swim School in Springfield where he also coached. His wife Ruth served as a director and treasurer of the school.

== Swimming community work ==
Silvia served as the President of the College Swimming Coaches Association of America, as well as chairing the Board of the International Swimming Hall of Fame and serving as president from 1973 to 1974.

== Outstanding swimmers and coaches mentored ==
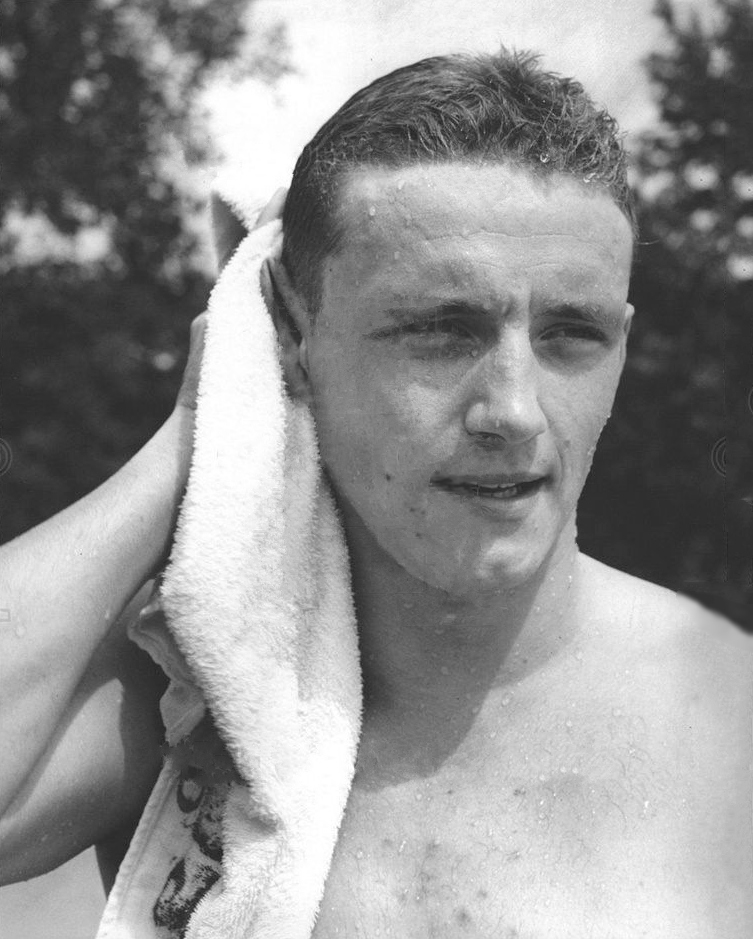
1956 Olympian Bill Yorzyk

One of Silvia's most outstanding swimmers was 1956 Olympic Gold medalist in butterfly, Bill Yorzyk, a National AAU champion, who set 13 world records in freestyle and butterfly. One of Yorzyk's Springfield team mates in the early 50's was Charles J. Butt, who would serve as an Assistant swimming coach to Silvia in the mid-50's, and later coach swimming at Bowdoin College from 1961–2000. Silvia mentored 1968 Springfield team captain Davis Hart who set a 1973 record swimming the English Channel. Early outstanding swimmers in the 1940s included 440-yard champion Harry Rawstrom and diver Ed Smyke, a three-year New England Intercollegiate Champion.

He is credited with mentoring 50 college swim coaches among his college swimmers, swimmers at the 1956 Olympics, and assistant coaches. Many of the coaches he mentored as swimmers or assistants had long, and highly distinguished careers. Harry Rawstrom, twice an All-American at Springfield in the late 1930's, coached the men's swimming team at the University of Delaware from 1946–1981. Thirty-three year Tufts University Swimming Coach Don Megerle, a seven-time New England Coach of the Year, served as an Assistant Coach under Silvia at Springfield College from 1970–1971, immediately before being hired by Tufts. Swim Coach Carl Samuelson swam for Silvia at Springfield in the 1950s and served as his Assistant Swimming Coach from 1957 to 1966. As a Williams College swim coach from 1966 to 1999, Samuelson led the team to 14 Men's New England Championships, and 13 Women's New England Championships. Samuelson's Williams teams occasionally competed against Silvia's Springfield teams. Fletcher Gilders, who Silvia coached at the 1956 Melbourne Olympics became a swimming and diving coach at Ohio University (1959–1984) and Kenyon College, where he earned an exceptional winning record.

Silvia died June 16, 1988, at a Springfield nursing home at the age of 87. He was married to Ruth Stubbs Silvia around 1935 and was survived by two daughters and several grandchildren. He was buried at Groveland Riverview Cemetery in Groveland, Massachusetts, just East of the city of Haverhill where he grew up and attended High School. His wife Ruth, who had a twenty-seven year career with Springfield's, James Naismith Basketball Hall of Fame, served on the board and worked as its first paid employee. Ruth predeceased Charles in February 1995, and was buried at Riverview Cemetery. She had served as a director and treasurer of the Pine Knoll Swimming school.

=== Honors ===
Silvia was an American Swimming Coaches Association Hall of Fame inductee and was selected as one of the College Swimming Coaches Association of America's (CSCAA) 100 Greatest Coaches of the Century. He was a recipient of the Collegiate and Scholastic Swim Trophy. Silvia also contributed to the sport of open water swimming and distance swimming and was awarded the Irving Davids and Captain Roger Wheeler Memorial Award by the International Marathon Swimming Hall of Fame in 1978 after coaching Springfield swimmer David Hart's record breaking 1973 swim of the English Channel.
