= Edgar Johnson (athletic director) =

American competition swimmer (born 1944)

Edgar N. Johnson
- Johnson as U. of Delaware swimmer, 1966

Biographical details
- Born: Circa 1944 (age 81–82); Wilmington, Delaware, U.S.
- Education: University of Delaware

Playing career
- 1962-1966: University of Delaware; Swim Team; Coach Harry Rawstrom
- Positions: butterfly, freestyle, backstroke

Coaching career (HC unless noted)
- 1969-: University of Delaware; Asst. Coach Swimming
- 1971-1979: University of Delaware; Cross Country Coach
- 1975-1979: Asst. Track Coach
- 1979-1984: University of Delaware; Women's Swim Coach
- 1881-1984: University of Delaware; Men's Swim Coach
- 1984-2009: University of Delaware; Athletic Director

Head coaching record
- Overall: 58-4 (Delaware Swim. Women); 18-9 (Delaware Swim. Men); 70-44 (Delaware Cross Country)

Accomplishments and honors

Championships
- '80-81, '81-82 Delaware Women Swim (2 EAIAW Division II eastern championships)

Awards
- James Lynah Service Award (Eastern College Athletic Conference)

Edgar N. Johnson (born circa 1944) is an American former competition swimmer for the University of Delaware, who coached the University of Delaware Swimming, Cross Country, and Track teams from 1971–1984 and served twenty-five years as the University of Delaware Athletic Director from 1984 to 2009.

== Early life and education ==
The elder of several brothers, Johnson was born the son of Madeline M. Nurnberg and Dr. Edgar N. Johnson, an ear, nose and throat specialist, in Wilmington, Delaware around 1944. While he was in high school, he swam for the Wilmington Athletic Club under Coach Bob Mattson, along with his younger brother David Johnson. Johnson's brother Dave was a U.S. Olympian who competed in the preliminaries of the 4x100 and 4x200 freestyle relays in Mexico City in 1968, but did not medal as he did not swim in the finals.

Johnson attended Salesianum School, an initially all-male independent Catholic institution in Wilmington, with a strong sports program. Leading the team to a win against Wilmington High on January 19, 1962, he swam for the Salesianum Swim Team, winning the 50-yard breast in 26.3 seconds and the 100-yard freestyle in 1:00 minute flat. Though Johnson did not participate in cross country during his high school years, he would later have success as a collegiate cross country coach at Delaware. He graduated Salesianum School on June 8, 1962.

== University of Delaware ==
He began his studies at University of Delaware in the fall of 1962, and swam for Coach Harry Rawstrom from around 1962-66, setting a total of nine school records, including marks in the 100 and 200-yard butterfly events. Johnson's mentor, Coach Rawstrom was a fixture at U. of Delaware and served as swimming coach for 35 years from 1946-1981. Rawstrom was inducted into the U. of Delaware Sports Hall of Fame in 2017 and the Delaware Sports Hall of Fame. The U. of Delaware swimming pool in Carpenter Sports Center is named in his honor.

Participating as a Freshman swimming for the University of Delaware in Lancaster, Pennsylvania on December 8, 1962, Johnson scored a win in the 500 and 200 freestyle events and was a member of the winning 4x100 freestyle relay though the team lost to Franklin and Marshall. Johnson served as a swim team Captain twice, and was a member of two record-breaking relay teams which included a new university record time of 3:31.5 for the 4 x 100 yard freestyle relay. He established a new University 200-yard freestyle record with a 1:56.7 in February 1966 in a win against Temple. He set a University of Delaware team record of 2:16.4 in the 200 backstroke in February 28, 1964 against LeHigh University.

Johnson set a new Delaware state record when he improved on his 200 butterfly with a time of 2:12.8 in the 1965 season, in what Coach Rawstrom considered, "the season's top individual accomplishment". Continuing to improve as a Senior, he swam the 200 fly in new record time of 2:09.9 and set a new school record in the 4x100-yard medley relay of 4:00.7 in a winning meet against LeHigh in Bethlaham in January 1966, improving the team to 4-1. On February 26, 1966, he lowered his 200 butterfly time to a first place 2:09.6 and was on the winning 400 Medley Relay team in the final meet of the season against Georgetown, helping to lead the team to a greatly improved season record of 11-1.

While majoring in Physical Education at Delaware, he earned a bachelor's degree in 1967; he later received a master's degree in education from the university in 1969, which by 1970 included a major in Guidance and Counseling.

== U. of Delaware coaching career ==
He became an assistant trainer and assistant men's swimming coach at the University of Delaware in 1969 under his former coach Harry Rawstrom, nearing the end of his graduate work at the University.

In 1971 he was named U. of Delaware men's cross-country coach and compiled a 70–44 record through the 1979 season. His cross country teams showed improvement, as his 75-76 record was 10-1 and his 76-77 record was 12-3. He also served as assistant track coach in 1975–79.

=== Championship women's swim team ===
In 1979, he became head coach of the women's swim team at Delaware amassing an impressive 58–4 record, which included a string of 42 consecutive wins between 1979 and 1982. His women's swim team at Delaware twice won the EAIAW Division II Eastern Championships, the 80-81, and 81-82 seasons. A serious Division II NCAA competitor, by February 1982, the women's team were training an average of 7-8,000 yards a day, with a few team members doing as much as 12-13,000 yards. One of his top swimmers, Mary Pat Johnson, had been a member of Delaware's 200-meter freestyle relay team and had noted that by February 1982 the team had had two undefeated seasons, and Johnson had established a remarkable 38-1 dual meet record with their only loss against Pennsylvania's Shippensburg University. Their 42 consecutive streak of dual meet wins was not broken until January 29, 1983 when they lost to Drexel. Taking it in stride, Johnson remarked, "our luck ran out".

Johnson was named head coach of the men's swimming team in 1981, as well as Director of Aquatics, and compiled an 18–9 career record through his tenure in 1984 when he was appointed Director of Athletics.

== U. of Delaware athletic director ==
In September 1984, Johnson was named athletic director for the University of Delaware. During his time in the position, he oversaw construction of a new men's and women's basketball venue, known as the Bob Carpenter Center. He also oversaw Delaware's first artificial surface facility at Fred P. Rullo Stadium, and major renovations of Delaware Stadium, Delaware Field House, and Carpenter Sports Building. Seeking a better home for his teams, he helped move the University of Delaware from the East Coast Conference to the America East Conference, and to its present place in the Colonial Athletic Association.

Johnson served as Vice-President of the East Coast Conference in 1987–90. He was a Chairman of the Atlantic 10 Football Executive Committee in 1997–98 and served as President of the Colonial Athletic Association (CAA), Delaware's latest athletic conference, for the 2006–07 and 2007–08 academic years.

After serving 25 years as athletic director, Johnson resigned in June 2009. At the time, he was one of the longest serving athletic directors of any existing University in the NCAA. During his tenure, his teams were awarded 10 consecutive America East Commissioner’s Cup Awards, won a total of 83 titles in their conferences, and appeared in 32 NCAA Championships.

As of 2009, Johnson and his wife Karen were residing in Newark and had two children and three grandchildren.

== Honors ==
In 2017, he was inducted into the University of Delaware Athletics Hall of Fame. In 2014, he was awarded the James Lynah Service Award for contributions to college athletics by the Eastern College Athletic Conference. In his honor, The Edgar Johnson Award is given each year to the University of Delaware senior male athlete who best exhibits the characteristics of dedication, hard work, and fairness, and consistently reaches for excellence. In 2025, he was inducted into the Delaware Sports Museum and Hall of Fame.
