= Steve Kuster =

American swimmer (born c. 1970)

Biographical details
- Born: circa 1970
- Education: University of Pennsylvania 1993

Playing career
- 1989-1993: University of Pennsylvania
- Positions: Butterfly, Medley, Freestyle

Coaching career (HC unless noted)
- 1993-1996: Wilton "Y" Wahoos
- 1996-1999: Harvard University; Mass Bay Marlins; Harvard Assistant Coach
- 1999-2024: Williams College; Head coach Men & Women

Accomplishments and honors

Championships
- (2001-2024); 21 Men's NESCAC team championships 20 Women's NESCAC team championships (Williams College); 52 NESCAC and NCAA Individual Titles (Williams College, Men & Women); 3 Ivy League Team Conference Titles (Harvard University); YWCA Women’s National Championship (Wilton Wahoos)

Awards
- (As of 1922); 8× Men's NESCAC Coach of the Year; 6× NESAC Women's Coach of the Year (Williams College); 4× NCAA Women’s coach of the year

Steve Kuster (born c. 1970) was an All-American competitive swimmer for the University of Pennsylvania and a swim coach for Williams College from 1999 through 2024 where he led the Williams men to 21 New England Small College Athletic Conference (NESCAC) Conference team championships and the Williams women to 20 NESCAC Conference team championships from 2001 to 2024. As of 2022, his men and women's teams have combined for 52 NCAA Division II and New England Small College Athletic Association (NESAC) national individual titles. Of these, 37 individual combined titles for both men and women have been in NESCAC Conference Championships.

== Amity Regional High ==
Kuster attended and swam for Amity Regional High School under Coach Paul Davis in Woodbridge, Connecticut. Excelling in multiple events, he won the 500 freestyle in 4:48.34 at a meet at Southern Connecticut State University in March 1986. Excelling in butterfly as well as other strokes while swimming for Amity High at the Central Connecticut Conference Western Division Championships Meet at Yale University, Kuster won both the 100 butterfly and 200 Individual Medley in March, 1987. The wins were considered state championships.

In perhaps his most memorable High School victory in March, 1988, Kuster won the Connecticut State Championship (Connecticut Interscholastic Athletic Conference Championship), LL Division, in the 200-yard freestyle setting a new conference record of 1:43.09.

By his Senior year at Amity, demonstrating mastery in a wide range of events, he held school records in the 100, 200, and 500 freestyles, as well as the 100 butterfly, 100 breast stroke, and 200 individual medley. He had Housatonic League championships in Southwestern Connecticut in the 100 backstroke and 50 freestyle.

== University of Pennsylvania ==
Kuster attended the University of Pennsylvania, graduating in 1993, where he competed in multiple events including Butterfly, set four Varsity records and was twice the recipient of All American Honorable Mention Honors.

While a student at the University of Pennsylvania, he attended the U.S. Olympic trials in 1992, and was a finalist by consolation in the 200 butterfly. Showing stroke diversity, in November 1989, as a Freshman at Penn, he set a school record in the 200-meter Individual Medley of 1:51.74, and won the 200-meter butterfly at an Ivy League meet against Columbia.

Graduating from Penn, in 1993, he was selected for the U.S. National team. As a member of the U.S. team in 1993, he participated in the World University games in Buffalo, New York, in July, though he did not medal in an event.

== Coaching ==
Kuster began his coaching career with the Wilton YMCA Yahoos in Wilton, Connecticut from 1993 to 1996, where he led one of his teams to a Women's National Championship.

He coached Harvard University swimming from 1996 to 1999, during a time when Harvard hand a particularly talented roster and an outstanding program. During his tenure, he led the team to three Ivy League Titles, and in 1998 to an 11th-place finish at the National Collegiate Athletic Association (NCAA) National Championships. During this period, along with Harvard coach Tim Murphy he also coached the Mass Bay Marlins, an age group team. While at Harvard, he studied for a master's degree in education, human development and psychology, which he completed in June, 1999.

He was the Head Coach of both the Men's and Women's teams at Williams College from September 1999 through 2024, replacing Hall of Fame Coach Carl Samuelson who had a long, exceptional history with the swimming program. Meeting high expectations after Samuelson's retirement, Kuster led the Williams men to 21 NESAC conference team championships and the Williams women to 20 NESCAC conference championships from 2001 to 2024. He led the men's and women's teams to a combined 37 New England Small College Athletic Association (NESAC) individual titles. By 2024, Kuster had coached 93 male All-Americans and 105 female All-Americans while at Williams.

=== Outstanding swimmers ===
He coached three CSCAA top 100 swimmers at Williams including Lindsay Payne, a 2005 graduate, Logan Todhunter, a 2012 graduate, and Caroline Wilson, a 2013 graduate. Olympic trial qualifiers include Lindsay Payne for both the 2004 and 2008 trials where she placed seventh in the 100 breast, Caroline Wilson, in the 2012 trials, Paul Dyrkacz in the 2012 trials, and Logan Todhunter in the 2012 trials.

He and his wife Kim live in Williamstown, Massachusetts with two sons. His son Cole is an accomplished competitive distance freestyle swimmer, who competed for Harvard and participated in two U.S. Olympic Trials.

=== Honors ===
As of 2022, Kuster was honored as an eight-time Men's NESCAC Coach of the Year, and a six-time NESCAC Women's Coach of the Year, while at Williams College. He has also been named an NCAA Division III Women's coach of the year four times. He is one of the College Swimming Coaches Association of America's (CSCAA) 100 Greatest Coaches of the Century.
