= Harry Rawstrom =

American swimmer (1917–1994)

Harry W. Rawstrom
- Rawstrom as Delaware Coach

Biographical details
- Born: February 11, 1917; Montclair, New Jersey, US
- Died: April 26, 1994 (aged 77); Seaford, Delaware, US
- Education: Springfield College

Playing career
- 1936–1940: Springfield College; Coach Charles Silvia
- Position: 220, 440-yard freestyle

Coaching career (HC unless noted)
- 1946–1981: University of Delaware; Swimming Head Coach
- 1948–1949: University of Delaware; Lacrosse Head Coach

Head coaching record
- Overall: 211–154 .578 Win Percentage (University of Delaware)

Accomplishments and honors

Championships
- 1947 Mason-Dixon Conference title 1954 Middle Atlantic Conference title

Awards
- 1971 CSCAA 25-year Award; 1982 Ransom J. Arthur Award; 1987 Delaware Sports Hall of Fame

Harry Wilfred Rawstrom (February 11, 1917 – April 26, 1994) was an All-American collegiate swimmer for Springfield College and the Head Swimming Coach for the University of Delaware from 1946 to 1981, leading them to the 1947 Mason-Dixon Conference and the 1954 Middle Atlantic Conference titles. At the University of Delaware, his teams earned an overall record in dual swim meets of 211–154.

== Education ==
=== High school swimming ===
Rawstrom was born in Montclair, New Jersey, on February 11, 1917, to Charles and Hilda Backland Rawstrom, and attended Montclair High School. He was unanimously elected team captain of the Montclair YMCA Varsity swim club for the 1934–35 season. In 1935, Rawstrom won the 220, 440 and 880-yard freestyle events in AAU competition swimming for the Montclair YMCA and was subsequently ranked as the best freestyle swimmer in New Jersey High School competition. With Rawstrom placing in the 220-yard freestyle and several relays while serving as team Captain, the Montclair YMCA Varsity Swim Club, coached by Dick Cheadle, won the New Jersey State YMCA Swimming Championship on March 16, 1935.

=== Springfield college ===
He attended Springfield College in Massachusetts, where as a competitive swimmer, he broke records and earned collegiate All American honors in two successive years. At Springfield, he swam for Hall of Fame Coach Charles "Red" Silvia, who mentored many outstanding swimmers, who later became outstanding coaches.

=== Setting 220, 440-yard freestyle swim records ===
Springfield Coach Silvia

Swimming for Springfield, Rawstrom first set the New England record for the 220-yard freestyle at the trials of the New England Interscholastic Swimming Championships on March 11, 1938, with a record time of 2:19.2, which was considered an exceptional performance. During the Christmas Holidays in December 1938, he received additional swim training while attending the National Aquatic Forum in Fort Lauderdale, Florida.

On January 11, 1939, Rawstrom broke his own New England Collegiate record for the 220-yard freestyle event with a time of 2:18.8. At the March, 1938 Eastern Collegiate Championships, Rawstrom won the 440-yard freestyle title with a time of 5:03.7, leading throughout the race, though Springfield once again lost the team competition to Harvard. In his Senior year, Rawstrom served as Captain for the Springfield team, and broke his New England record for the 220-yard event for the last time in February, 1940 with a time of 2:17.6. On March 15, 1940, he set a New England record of 5:01.8 in the 440-yard freestyle at the New England Intercollegiate Swimming Championships in Williamstown, Massachusetts.

He was a WWII era veteran of the Army Air Corp, where he attained the rank of Captain during his service. After announcing a Valentines Day engagement in February, nine months later on November 20, 1941, he married Edna Morrison of Rochester, New York, who would remain his wife for 52 years.

== Coaching ==
After completing his military service, Rawstrom coached the swim team at the University of Delaware from 1946 to 1981. Achieving early success as a swim coach, his 1947 team won the Mason-Dixon Conference Title. In 1954, his Blue Hen swimmers won the Middle Atlantic Conference title. Rawstrom served as a physical education professor at the university from 1948 to 1981. He helped co-found the university's men's lacrosse program with fellow University of Delaware Coach Milt Roberts. Taking the reins for the team's first two seasons, Rawstrom was Lacrosse Team head coach from 1948 to 1949. One of Rawstrom's successors as University of Delaware's Lacrosse Coach, Bob Shillinglaw, would have an exceptional record after beginning his coaching tenure in 1979, winning the most total games in the team's history.

=== Outstanding swimmers coached ===
From 1949 to 1953, Rawstrom coached Dr. Art Mayer who would later be inducted into the Delaware Sports Hall of Fame and the University of Delaware Athletics Hall of Fame. Rawstrom also coached Fred Freibott, Captain of the 1958–59 Delaware swim team, a holder of many school records, and a recipient of both the Hugh Dougherty Swim Award and the University of Delaware Medallion for Excellence. Rawstrom, once said of Freibott, " He was my most talented swimmer in terms of natural speed." He coached Edgar Johnson at Delaware from 1962 to 1966. Johnson, a University of Delaware Hall of Fame inductee, would become an outstanding swim Coach at Delaware, and later serve as athletic director.

=== Masters age-group swimmer ===
Both at the end of his coaching career and after his retirement, Rawstrom was a dedicated age group swimmer and trained with the Middle Atlantic Masters and 1776 Masters Swim Clubs in the Delaware Valley region for United States Masters Swimming. In one of his best performances at the end of his coaching career, at 63 he won the 50, 100, 200, and 500-yard freestyle events at the Capital Sea Devils Meet in Washington D.C. He swam in his retirement most frequently from the ages of 60–74 and was a six-time USMS All-American swimmer, excelling and frequently making top ten lists in short-distance freestyle events, and freestyle and medley relays. An accomplished age group swimmer, Rawstrom set both national and world age-class records. Active with adult swimming into his final years, he served as the USMS Recognition and Awards Committee from 1989 to 1994, and made the University of Delaware pool available to US Master's Swimmers and US Master's swim meets.

In his retirement he attended Newark United Methodist Church with his wife Edna. He enjoyed bridge, university football games, gardening, traveling to Master's swim meets, and his quiet and scenic summer residence in Delaware's Bethany Beach.

=== Death ===
Rawstrom died on April 26, 1994, at Nanticoke Memorial Hospital in Seaford, Delaware. He had a primary residence in Newark, Delaware, near the university. He had previously suffered a heart attack at his quiet summer home in Bethany Beach, Delaware and had been suffering from heart issues since the late 1980s. He was buried at the Delaware Veterans Memorial Cemetery in Bear, New Castle County, Delaware, where his wife would later be buried beside him.

=== Honors ===
In 1971, prior to his coaching retirement, Rawstrom was honored by the College Swimming Coaches Association of America (CSCAA) for 25 years of service. In 1982 he received the Captain Ransom J. Arthur Award for his contributions to United States Masters Swimming, and was inducted into the Delaware Sports Hall of Fame in 1987. He was a member of the University of Delaware Athletic Hall of Fame, and in a unique honor in recognition of his many years as a swim coach, in 1992 the University of Delaware Pool in Carpenter Hall was named the Harry W. Rawstrom Natatorium in his honor. The natatorium is a 15,000-square foot facility that features a modern 8-lane, 25-yard pool, a diving well with 1-meter, 3-meter, and platform boards, and seating for approximately 700 fans.
