= Middletown Public Schools (Connecticut) =

School district in Connecticut, United States

Address
- 311 Hunting Hill Avenue Middletown, Connecticut 06457 United States

District information
- Type: Public
- Grades: Pre K-12
- Established: 1856
- Superintendent: Dr. Alberto Vazquez Matos
- Schools: 10 schools (8 elementary, 1 middle, 1 high)

Other information
- Teachers' unions: AFT Connecticut; Connecticut Education Association
- Website: https://www.middletownschools.org/

Middletown Public Schools is a school district headquartered in Middletown, Connecticut.

== Schools ==
=== High schools ===
- Middletown High School

=== Middle schools ===
- Beman Middle School

=== Elementary schools ===
- Bielefield School
- Farm Hill School
- Lawrence School
- Macdonough School
- Moody School
- Snow School
- Spencer School
- Wesley School

Others:

- Middletown Adult Education
- Transition to Life Center - A school for students aged between 18 and 21
