= Carl Samuelson (swim coach) =

American swim coach (1931–2026)

Carl R. Samuelson
Biographical details
- Born: October 15, 1931
- Died: February 24, 2026 (aged 94)
- Education: Springfield College '57

Playing career
- 1952–1957: Springfield College
- Positions: Swimmer, freestyle

Coaching career (HC unless noted)
- 1957–1966: Springfield College; Freshman Coach; Asst. Varsity Coach
- 1966–1999: Williams College

Head coaching record
- Overall: 181-72 0.715% (Williams Men); 145-26 0.848% (Williams Women)

Accomplishments and honors

Championships
- '82, '83, '92, NCAA Div. III Nat. Champions; 13 x New England Champions (Williams Women); 14 x New England Champions (Williams Men)

Awards
- 1980 N. E. Coach of the Year

Carl R. Samuelson (October 15, 1931 – February 24, 2026) was an American swim coach. He competed for Springfield College specializing in freestyle and was the swim coach for Williams College from 1966 to 1999, where he led the team to 14 Men's New England Championships, and 13 Women's New England Championships. The Women's team were National NCAA Division III Champions three times, and the Men's team were in the top five NCAA finishes 10 times. In an exclusive honor, Samuelson was named to the College Swimming Coaches of America Association's (CSCAA) 100 Greatest Swim Coaches of the Century.

== Early life ==
Samuelson grew up in Middletown, Connecticut, where he attended Middletown High School. As a Freshman, he had to convince his principal at Middletown to start a High School Swim Team in 1949. Despite having no swimming pool, Samuelson succeeded, and the school held meets and practices at a local YMCA pool. Samuelson also participated in Track and Field at Middletown High.

At the Connecticut State Swimming Championship in New Haven in March 1950, he swam third for the Middletown High Tigers in the winning 200-yard freestyle relay, recording a combined team time of 1:43.4. At the Connecticut Central Interscholastic Swimming Championships in February 1950, his 200-yard freestyle relay team from Middlebrook High won the event and set a new record of 1:47.2, exciting the crowd in a very close race with rival Manchester High, who were overall winners in the meet. While at Middletown, he met his wife Nancy who was a student at Connecticut's Woodrow Wilson High. The couple would have three children, two girls and a boy.

== Springfield College ==
After graduating Middletown High, he attended Springfield College, under Head Coach Charles E. Silvia. Silvia believed in bringing out the best in each swimmer but was skilled at reducing stress at meets. At Springfield, Samuelson was a swimmer all four years, and received a B.S. in Physical Education. While excelling as a sprinter at Springfield, he helped the team win two New England Inter-scholastic League Team Championships.

Though he was originally in the Class of 1956, Samuelson spent two years in the Military which delayed his graduation from Springfield. After graduating in 1957, he also taught Physical Education in addition to coaching, and worked closely with Charles Silvia, who was both his swim coach, and his mentor as a new instructor at Springfield.

He remained at Springfield to earn a master's degree in Physical Education and coached their Freshman Swimming Team from 1957 to 1966, which aligned with his own professional goals. One of Samuelson's most outstanding coaching successors at Springfield was Coach Peter Avdoulos, who coached diving at Springfield from around 1985–2024, leading the team to several national championships. Samuelson learned a great deal about coaching while assistant coaching under Hall of Fame Head Coach Charles Silvia. Samuelson also assisted with the Varsity team at Springfield during this period. While obtaining his master's degree, he also coached Suffield Academy in the 1956–57 year. His 1964–65 Springfield freshman team were the first to ever beat the Harvard freshmen.

== Coaching Williams ==
Later the coach of Wesleyan University, Hugh McCurdy, called Samuelson to ask him if he would like his name put in contention for the position of Head Swimming Coach at Williams College, as their current coach Bob Muir, a future International Swimming Hall of Fame inductee, was retiring. Muir had built a strong team at Williams while coaching from 1936-1966, where he established a record of 185-44-4. With an impressive series of wins, twenty-seven of his teams never lost a regular season dual meet, and under Muir the Williams Swim team won the New England Championships seventeen times. Familiar with Bob Muir and the Williams College swimming program, Samuelson agreed to become a candidate for the coaching job.

After a strong interview at Williams College, Samuelson was offered the position of Head swimming coach in the Spring of 1966, and he began coaching in the 1966–7 season. In 1970, Williams became a coed University, and Samuelson, as a Swim coach and the Director of Physical Education helped the school transition to a fully coeducational institution. He coached the women's teams as well as the men's and their performances were equally outstanding.

During Samuelson's tenure as head coach, the Williams Men's team were New England Champions 14 times with 8 consecutive championships, and he mentored 285 All-Americans. The Men's team had 10 top five NCAA finishes and 3 undefeated seasons. Over more than a quarter century at Williams, swimmers mentored by Samuelson received All-America status 340 times, and took 39 individual, and 23 NCAA relay titles.

The overall Men's record was 181 wins, 72 losses, which earned Samuelson's teams a .715 winning percentage.

=== Williams women's team ===
Samuelson began coaching the Williams Women's swimming team in the 1975–76 season. Always one to pioneer new ventures, Samuelson started the team with just three talented women who swam with the Men's Junior Varsity that year, as there was not yet a women's team. The three included Olympic trials qualifier Leslie Teal from Kansas City, who had finished only a few seconds shy of qualifying for the Olympics in butterfly. The three had asked him if there was a New England Championship for Women. Samuelson wasn't sure, but was told after his first inquiry they couldn't swim in the championship as they had competed exclusively against men that year. Not satisfied with that answer, Samuelson, requested the New England Women's league coaches take a vote, and to his surprise, they voted to include his three women swimmers as participants in their first New England Championships. During Samuelson's tenure, his women's team grew and with outstanding new recruits won 13 New England Championships which included seven consecutive championships. One of his outstanding women swimmers in the mid-1980's was Joan Horgan, who in her career held five NCAA Championship titles, and served as a Williams team captain in the 1986-87 swim year. Horgan noted that Samuelson employed a relaxed personal approach to each swimmer which greatly eased her feelings of burn-out after a long swimming career and believed "Sam cared more about me than about my swimming".

Continuing to improve in competition, in 1982 the Women's team won their first NCAA Division III championships and gained national rather than exclusively regional recognition. The team won the NCAA Division III again in 1983, showing dominance in the sport with back-to-back national championships. In 1992, his Women's team repeated again as National Champions. Samuelson believed that those first two championships helped the women's team gain national recognition, helped improved funding and attendance for the program and helped him to convince more competitive student athletes to give the team a chance. During his tenure as coach, Samuelson's Women's teams had eight undefeated seasons, with two consecutive undefeated seasons, and had 11 top five NCAA finishes.

The Williamson Women's team overall record through the 1995 season when Samuelson was inducted into the Springfield College Hall of Fame was 145 wins and 26 losses for an outstanding .848 winning percentage. Nonetheless, Samuelson's approach was to always keep the fun in swimming, and to let the team members feel like a family rather than a pressured squad of military recruits. Samuelson stressed that academics came first.

After 33 years coaching at Williams, Samuelson retired in 1999 and was replaced by University of Pennsylvania swimmer and prior Harvard Coach Steve Kuster. In 2016, around the age of 84, he began living at the Sweetwood Retirement Living Community in Williamstown. In September 2020, Samuelson's wife Nancy died.

=== Swimming community ===
In 1968, Samuelson was elected as President of the New England Intercollegiate Swimming Association. His friend Hugh McCurdy, the coach at Wesleyan College who had helped him obtain his position as Head Coach for Williams College was selected as Secretary-Treasurer.

== Death ==
Samuelson died on February 24, 2026, at the age of 94.

== Honors ==
Samuelson was the 1980 New England Coach of the Year and received the honor two more times. His hometown selected him for the Middletown Sports Hall of Fame in February 1999. Impressively, he was also chosen as one of the 100 Greatest Swimming and Diving Coaches of the Century in 2021 by the College Swimming and Diving Coaches Association of America (CSCAA). In 2000, the Williams College Swimming Pool, was renamed the Samuelson-Muir pool, to honor him, and Coach Muir, who had been a long-term acquaintance and friend for many years. Though he retired officially as Williams College Head Swim Coach in 1966, Muir returned occasionally to assist with coaching into the 1980's. When Carl Samuelson as Swim Coach, and Nancy, who served as the Health Center's Medical Secretary, both retired in 1999, alumni established a scholarship fund in their honor.
