= Edward Reed (coach) =

American water polo coach

Biographical details
- Born: c. 1943
- Education: Springfield College; BA, MA 1966

Playing career
- 1961-1965: Springfield College
- Positions: 200, 400 IM breast stroke

Coaching career (HC unless noted)
- 1966-1971: Tufts University; Swimming
- 1971-1992: Brown University; Swimming, Water Polo
- 1994-1995: University of Alabama; Interim Coach
- 1995-2008: University of Alabama; Aquatics Director only (Retired)
- 1993-1996: U.S. National Men's Water Polo
- 1996: U.S. Olympic Team; Asst. Coach

Head coaching record
- Overall: 420 win, 159 loss, 5 tie.721 Win Percentage (Brown Water Polo)

Accomplishments and honors

Championships
- 17 consec. N. E. Champs, '75-'91 (Water Polo), Brown; 4 Eastern Championships (Water Polo), Brown

Awards
- Eastern Wat. Pol. League Coach of Year (1987, 1989); Rhode Island Aquat. Hall of Fame '86; Brown U. Hall of Fame '96; U.S. Water Polo Hall of Fame '99

Ed Reed was coach of Brown University’s water polo team from 1971 to 1992, where he led the team to seventeen consecutive New England Championships between 1975-1991. Prior to 1974, Brown's Water Polo team had been a Club Team, but achieved Varsity status that year. Initially, he was also head coach of the varsity swim team at Brown.

== College swimming ==
As an undergraduate at Springfield College, Reed was a two-time All-American in swimming. At the March 1965 New England Intercollegiate Championships in Cambridge he won the 200 Individual Medley with a New England Intercollegiate Swimming Association (NEISA) record time of 2:06.5 minutes. In 1965, he also set a NEISA record of 4:42 minutes in the 400-yard IM. He set school records in the Individual Medley, placed frequently in back stroke events, and served as team Co-Captain for Springfield in 1965. His knowledge of the training required to obtain swimming speed would later be valuable in coaching both Water Polo teams and swim teams.

== Brown swimming and water polo coach ==
Coaching water polo at Brown, Reed achieved an impressive record of 420 wins, 159 losses, and 5 ties, holding a winning record in all seasons. He also won seventeen New England Championships in a row in addition to four Eastern Championships (three of those consecutively). His team went to the Eastern Championship ten times, and the NCAA tournament eleven. In 1983, 1984, and 1985, Brown University placed 6th at the NCAA tournament. Seventeen of his players earned All-American honors.

== Coaching positions ==
Reed initially coached swimming for Tufts University beginning in 1966 following his graduation with a Masters from Springfield College. After leaving Tufts in the Spring of 1971, he began coaching both swimming and water polo at Brown University where he stayed until 1994. Reed was appointed interim-coach at the University of Alabama for the 1994–1995 season, and then became the Aquatic Center Manager and then Aquatic Sports Director, before retiring after a long career in 2008.

=== International coaching ===
Reed was a member of the coaching staff for the United States Men's National Water Polo Team from 1993 to 1996. In 1996, he served on the Olympic coaching staff for the 1996 Olympics in Atlanta. He also worked with the American squad that won the gold medal at the Pan American Games in Argentina in 1995.

== Water Polo community work ==
He was elected president of the American Water Polo Coaches Association, and served on committees for United States Water Polo. He coached Alabama's club team for several years, before his involvement with the Collegiate Water Polo Association led him to be named a member of the Technical Committee for the CWPA where he evaluates and selects officials for the league.

== Honors ==
Reed was named Eastern Water Polo League Coach of the Year in 1987 and 1989. He is a member of the Rhode Island Aquatic Hall of Fame (inducted 1986), Brown University Athletic Hall of Fame (1996), and the United States Water Polo Hall of fame (1999).

=== Retirement from U. Alabama ===
While at Alabama, Reed lived in Tuscaloosa, Alabama with his wife Andy. The couple have two children. Since retiring from the University of Alabama aquatics in 2008, he has worked as a part-time Master's swim coach, Club Water Polo Coach, and CWPA official while living in Northport, a close suburb of Tuscaloosa.
