= Education in Stamford, Connecticut =

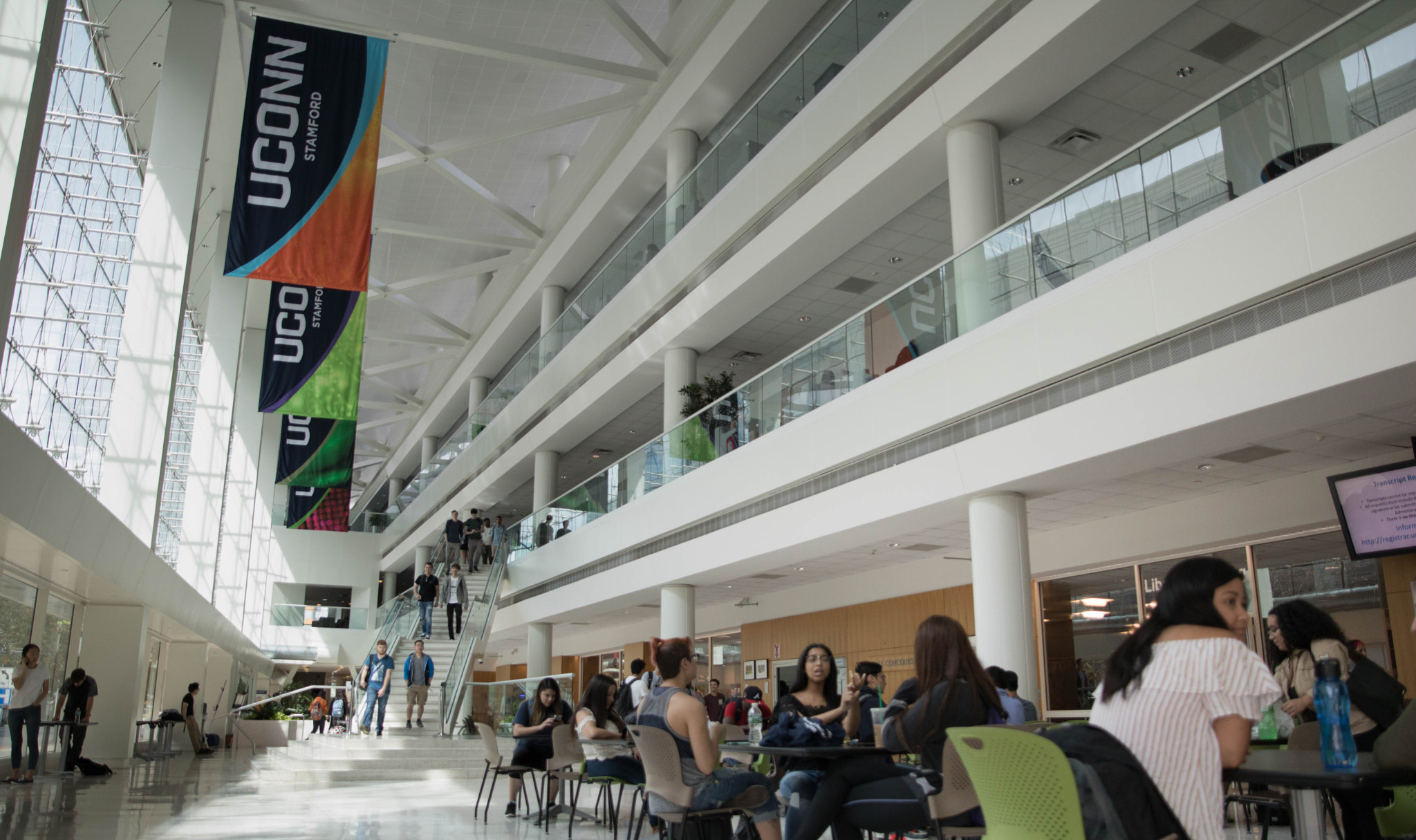
The interior of the Stamford campus of the University of Connecticut

Education in Stamford, Connecticut takes place in both public and private schools and college and university campuses. Stamford has a highly educated population. Per the American Community Survey from 2017 to 2021, 89.1% of adults aged 25 and older graduated from high school, and 52.3% have a Bachelor's degree or higher. This compares to 91.1% and 37.9% nationally, respectively.

Stamford is home to a branch of the University of Connecticut, commonly called UConn Stamford. Sacred Heart University also hosts a physician assistant studies program located on the Stamford Hospital campus. Stamford Public Schools comprises 13 elementary schools, 5 middle schools, and 3 high schools. As of the 2022–2023 school year, the school district serves 16,212 students. The supermajority of Stamford Public Schools funding comes from the City of Stamford. In the 2022-2023 fiscal year, Stamford Public Schools had a total operating budget of $301,843,542, representing 82.6% of its total revenue.

== History ==
The first public schoolhouse was built in Stamford in 1671, and has been described by a local historian as a "crude, unheated wooden structure only ten or twelve feet square". It was built when settlers tore down their original meeting house, which they had outgrown after three decades, and used some of the timbers to put up a school near the Old Town Hall on Atlantic Square.

In 1838, William Betts founded Betts Academy, a private all-boys academy in Stamford, which operated until it burned in 1908.

Stamford's first school with defined grades, the Centre School, opened on Broad Street, near the location of Stamford's original schoolhouse, in 1852. The original Centre School building, which was made of wood, burned, and was replaced by a brick building in 1867.

A private all-girls school, called Catherine Aiken, opened in Stamford in 1855. At one point Georges Clemenceau taught French at the school, and married a student from the school, Mary Plummer. The school closed in the 1890s.

In 1873, Stamford's Town School Committee created Stamford High School, to be housed in a room of the Centre School. Originally, students had to pass an examination to gain admission into the high school.

King School, another private all-boys school, opened in 1876. The school still exists in Stamford today, although it is now coeducational.

In 1896, a dedicated building for Stamford's high school was built, located on Forest Street.

State Trade School, a vocational school now known as J.M. Wright Technical High School, opened in 1919 on Schuyler Avenue.

The current building of Stamford High School, located on Strawberry Hill Avenue, was completed in 1928.

UConn Stamford opened in 1951 as a two-year college.

Rippowam High School opened on High Ridge Road in 1961. A third high school, Westhill High School, opened on Roxbury Road in 1971.

In 1983, Rippowam High School shut its operations as a general high school, and repurposed as a specialized program.

In 1999, Stamford's first charter school, Trailblazers Academy, opened. The school served middle school students.

=== 21st Century ===
In 2002, with the passage of the No Child Left Behind Act, Connecticut began administering a standardized test in the 2005–2006 school year. The law, and the resulting Connecticut Mastery Test (CMT) and Connecticut Academic Performance Test (CAPT), was highly controversial in Connecticut. Critics derided the tests' cost to administer, which the state filed a federal lawsuit to try to lessen, as well as delays in results. The Connecticut State Department of Education usually published results of Connecticut Mastery Test scores for districts in July and for individual schools in late August.

==== 2006 CMT results ====
Thirteen of the city's 20 public schools made the 2006 list of failing schools, based on Connecticut Mastery Test results, according to the state Department of Education's "No Child Left Behind Act" report (NCLB), five more than in 2005. The NCLB Act sets rising targets for schools, so even though some may have improved since the previous testing, they can be cited if improvement isn't made fast enough, Superintendent of Schools Joshua Starr told The Advocate of Stamford (August 24, 2006), which published a list of the local schools provided by Associated Press:

- Rippowam Middle School — "whole school deficiencies in math and reading"
- K.T. Murphy School — "whole school deficiencies in reading"
- Julia A. Stark School — "whole school deficiencies in reading"
- Newfield School — "subgroup deficiencies in math and reading"
- Rogers School — "subgroup deficiencies in math and reading"
- Roxbury School — "subgroup deficiencies in math and reading"
- Springdale School — "subgroup deficiencies in math and reading"
- Toquam Magnet School — "subgroup deficiencies in math and reading"
- Davenport Ridge School — "subgroup deficiencies in math and reading"
- Stillmeadow School — "subgroup deficiencies in math and reading"
- Hart School — "subgroup deficiencies in math and reading"
- Turn of River School — "subgroup deficiencies in math and reading"
- Scofield Middle School — "subgroup deficiencies in math and reading"

In nearby communities, 11 Norwalk schools were cited, one in Greenwich, one in Wilton, none in New Canaan or Darien.

==== 2007 CMT results ====
Districtwide 2007 Connecticut Mastery Test results for Stamford public schools showed improvements in math and writing compared with the 2006 scores, but lagged in reading. The school district uses the data to adjust teaching. The district has been concentrating its efforts in improving math skills and also in bringing up scores for black students. This year's results showed small gains in almost all grades for black students.

The biggest increase in math scores was from sixth grade students. A total of 54 percent of them reached the state goal, compared with 48 percent in 2006. Fifth grade students had the smallest increase, with 63 percent reaching the state goal, up from 60 percent in 2006. Students in Grades 3 and 7 also had higher scores than the previous year.

In writing, scores improved, with third grade students making the most gains — 60 percent met the state goal, up from 54 percent the previous year. Students in the eighth grade scored only 1 percent higher — 55 percent met the state standard.

In reading, third grade students improved, with 49 percent meeting the state goal, up from 46 percent in 2006. Only 48 percent of fourth grade students met the state goal, down from 55 percent in 2006.

==== Subsequent developments ====
In the summer of 2007 a Stamford Academy student selected by school officials traveled to Benin as a "cultural ambassador" who helped build classrooms and lived with villagers as part of the Bridgeport, Connecticut-based Higher Education and Responsibility through Overseas Exchange program.

No Child Left Behind was repealed in 2015, and replaced with the Every Student Succeeds Act. That year, the state replaced the CMT and CAPT with the Smarter Balanced Assessment, as part of the multi-state Smarter Balanced Assessment Consortium.

In May 2018, Stamford Academy, a charter high school run by non-profit Domus Kids Inc, was put on probation by the state government, due to poor outcomes. At the time, 42.3% of Stamford Academy students were not in attendance at school on any given day, and nearly all met the definition of chronically absent, out more than 10% of the time. The Connecticut Education Association questioned the school's financial accountability and transparency.

As of the 2018–2019 school year, 47.8% of Stamford School District students reached grade level English standards, and 42.8% of students reached grade level math standards.

In July 2019, Trailblazers Academy, a charter middle school also run by Domus Kids Inc, announced it would close. The school cited financial difficulties as its reason for closing, following funding cuts implemented by the Stamford Board of Education.

Stamford Academy, closed following the 2019–2020 school year. At the time of its closing, Stamford Academy was the city's only charter high school.

As of the 2021–2022 school year, 40.6% students reached grade level English standards, and 32.4% reached grade level math standards. Statewide, 48.5% of students met English standards, and 42.5% met Math standards.

== Higher education ==
Stamford is home to a branch of the University of Connecticut, commonly called UConn Stamford. Sacred Heart University also hosts a physician assistant studies program located on the Stamford Hospital campus. The city also used to host a branch of the University of Bridgeport. UConn Stamford opened in 1951 as a two-year college. UConn Stamford's campus is located in Downtown Stamford, and its current main building, reconverted from hosting a former Bloomingdale's store that had closed in 1990, opened in 1998. In 2017, UCONN Stamford opened a 300-student dormitory around the corner from the Stamford Campus on Washington Boulevard.

== Stamford Public Schools ==
Stamford Public Schools comprises 13 elementary schools, 5 middle schools, and 3 high schools. As of the 2022–2023 school year, the school district serves 16,212 students, a slight increase over the previous year. Stamford Public Schools students come from a diverse array of backgrounds, mirroring the city's diversity. As of 2022, the majority of Stamford Public Schools students are Hispanic or Latino. 75 different languages are spoken at home by Stamford Public School students, with English, Spanish, Haitian Creole, Bengali, and Polish among the most common languages. Per an April 2023 report by the Connecticut State Department of Education on racial imbalance in public school enrollment, none of the 10 Stamford School District schools studied had a racial imbalance of more than 14% compared to the school district at large.

Stamford is one of the eight public school systems in Connecticut's District Reference Group H, a District Reference Group (formerly known as Educational Reference Groups) made by the state Connecticut State Department of Education for the purpose of comparison with the achievement levels of similar schools and districts. District reference groups are defined as "districts whose students' families are similar in education, income, occupation and need, and that have roughly similar enrollment". The other seven school districts in the group are Ansonia, Danbury, Derby, East Hartford, Meriden, Norwalk, Norwich, and West Haven. About 65% of Stamford Public Schools' student body is classified as "high needs" by the state of Connecticut, which means they either have a disability, are an English learner with limited understanding of the language, or are eligible for free or reduced-price meals. This is higher than the 53% number statewide. According to the Connecticut State Department of Education, in the 2004–2005 academic year, 42.7% of Stamford's public school students were economically disadvantaged, and 11.6% were students with disabilities.

The supermajority of Stamford Public Schools funding comes from the City of Stamford. In the 2022-2023 fiscal year, Stamford Public Schools had a total operating budget of $301,843,542, provided by the City of Stamford. This represented 82.6% of its total revenue that year, with an additional 9.8% coming from federal grants, 7.5% coming from state grants, and 0.1% coming from other sources.

=== Elementary schools ===
Stamford Public Schools' 13 public elementary schools are Davenport Ridge Elementary School, Hart Magnet Elementary School, Julia A. Stark Elementary School, K.T. Murphy Elementary School, Newfield Elementary School, Northeast Elementary School, Rogers International School, Roxbury Elementary School, Springdale Elementary School, Stillmeadow Elementary School, Strawberry Hill School (an extension of Rogers International), Toquam Magnet Elementary School, and Westover Magnet Elementary School.

- Westover Elementary School, 412 Stillwater Avenue, dedicated its auditorium on September 16, 2006, to former principal Edmund Barbieri, who became principal in 1979 and continued to head the school for 13 years. He died in 2004. Barbieri built up the magnet program at the school, set up the city's first gifted-students program and the state's first full-day Kindergarten, according to a committee of parents, teachers and city officials who supported the dedication.
- Toquam Magnet Elementary School - it focuses on Social Studies as the main study. The former principal, Eileen Swerdlick, was chosen as the Assistant Superintendent of Schools, and left Toquam in July 2004.
- Roxbury Elementary School is an elementary school containing approximately 600 students. It is right across the street from Westhill High School, one of the three high schools in Stamford, Connecticut. The former principal of Roxbury, Gail Flaster, retired before the 2008–2009 school year. She was replaced by Gloria Manna. Ironically, Roxbury Elementary School is located on Westhill Road, while Westhill High School is located on Roxbury Road.

=== Middle schools ===
Stamford Public Schools' five public middle schools are Cloonan Middle School, Dolan Middle School, Rippowam Middle School, Scofield Magnet Middle School, and Turn of River Middle School.

==== Rippowam Middle School ====
Located on High Ridge Road, Rippowam is the district's largest traditional middle school.

George Giberti, principal of the Scofield Magnet Middle School for the 2006–2007 school year, was reassigned as principal at Rippowam for the school year beginning in the fall of 2007. Schools Superintendent Joshua Starr said Giberti has experience in raising math scores and has been in charge of large traditional middle schools in New York City and Long Island. Giberti switched places with Jan Grossman, who took over Giberti's job at Scofield, where she had previously been assistant principal. The transfers were part of a large number under a policy by Starr to give administrators more varied experiences.

Various groups use the Rippowam building on weekends, including The Stamford Youth Foundation's chess league and wrestling program, a youth basketball program in the gym, a Chinese school on Sundays, and, since 2007, the German School of Connecticut.

==== Turn of River Middle School ====
In early 2007, school officials said they worry that a child might be seriously injured in an accident involving the school's many large glass windows, some of which are floor-to-ceiling and not shatter-resistant. The windows of the building, which was constructed in 1963, are often made of single panes of glass instead of more modern double- or triple-panes that insulate better. A few years before 2007, a student leaning back in his chair accidentally struck a window pane which then shattered.

=== High schools ===
Stamford Public Schools' three public high schools are Westhill High School, Stamford High School, and the Academy of Information Technology and Engineering. As of 2022, the Stamford School District's average SAT score was 990, below the state average.

==== Rites of Passage ====
Rites of Passage is an after school program on African American history. It is hosted by the Stamford Public Schools. Students attend classes for 12 Saturdays and learn about African origins, slavery, and civil rights. The program culminates in an educational trip to West Africa to see the ancestral home of many African Americans. The program requires competitive admission and acceptance.

== J. M. Wright Technical High School ==
J. M. Wright Technical High School, located just south of Scalzi Park, is a public vocational school run by the State of Connecticut through the Connecticut Technical High School System. Facing declining enrollment, the school closed after the 2008–2009 school year, but was reopened for the 2014–2015 school year. It has stayed open since.

== Stamford Charter School for Excellence ==
The Stamford Charter School for Excellence is the city's sole charter elementary school.

== Private education ==
The city has several private schools, including the Jewish High School of Connecticut, King School, the Long Ridge School, Sacred Heart Academy (closed since 2006), the Mead School, Bi-Cultural Hebrew Academy, and Trinity Catholic High School.

=== German School of Connecticut ===
The German School of Connecticut (GSC) holds classes on Saturday mornings from 9:30 am to 12:15 pm. The German School in Stamford (at Rippowam Middle School, 381 High Ridge Road, Stamford, CT, 06905) currently teaches more than 250 students each Saturday in 20 to 22 classrooms. The school also runs classes in West Hartford (At the First Baptist Church, 90 North Main Street, West Hartford, CT 06107). The German School offers German language instruction in a friendly, stimulating learning environment for children age 2 through high school and adults.

In addition to language education, German culture and traditions (both old and new) form an important part of the curriculum, offering students a modern view of German speaking countries.

=== The Long Ridge School ===
The Long Ridge School is a co-educational independent day school for children two years old through Grade 5. The school was founded by Harriet Rowland in 1938 in her home on Old Long Ridge Road. Mrs. Rowland founded the school based on the premise that children learn in different ways and at different rates and that challenging academics can go hand in hand with a joyful educational experience. The school moved to its 14-acre Erskine Road campus in the mid 1950s. An Arts and Athletics Center, winner of the Connecticut HOBI award for excellence in new construction, was opened in 2007. The Long Ridge School is one of the few schools in Fairfield County focusing specifically on early childhood and elementary education.

=== The Mead School ===
The Mead School, founded in 1969, serves children in preschool programs through Grade 8. The school, with an enrollment of 178 in the 2004–2005 academic year, adds programs in drama, music, art and dance to a traditional curriculum. The school also emphasizes community service and skills in negotiation and mediation.

=== Bi-Cultural Hebrew Academy ===
The Bi-Cultural Hebrew Academy of Connecticut is a co-educational, nonprofit Modern Orthodox Jewish institution founded in 1955 and serving children in Pre-Kindergarten through Twelfth Grade. Students in 8th Grade spend a month in Israel, while the 6th Graders go to Philadelphia in June, and the 7th Grade goes to Greenkill in October and Washington D.C. in June. The school had an enrollment of 431 students in the 2004–2005 academic year. In 2018, the school, which had previously been a Pre-K through 8th grade school named Bi-Cultural Day School, merged with the Jewish High School of Connecticut and became Bi-Cultural Hebrew Academy of Connecticut. Previously, the school won a National Blue Ribbon Award in 2017.

The school's curriculum is a complement of secular and Judaic studies, which include, according to the school's website, "an understanding of Jewish values, a broad knowledge of Jewish history and religious practice, sensitivity to community needs, a strong bond with Israel and an appreciation of their dual heritage as American Jews". Hebrew language, Torah and all aspects of Jewish observance are taught. In the past decade (up to 2007), the school has organized and sent more than 200 marchers a year to the annual Israel Day Parade in New York.
