= Vinal =

Vinal may refer to:

== People ==
- Arthur H. Vinal (1854-1923), American architect
- Robert A. Vinal (1821-1887), American businessman
- William G. Vinal (1881–1976), American outdoors educator
- Vinal G. Good (1906-2000), American politician

== Places ==
- Vinal Avenue, Somerville, Massachusetts, United States:
  - House at 42 Vinal Avenue
  - House at 49 Vinal Avenue
- Vinal Haven, Maine, United States

== Other ==
- Vinal Technical High School, Middletown, Connecticut, United States

== See also ==
- Vinall, a surname
- Vinyl (disambiguation)
