= Taftville, Connecticut =

- Taftville
- U.S. National Register of Historic Places
- U.S. Historic district
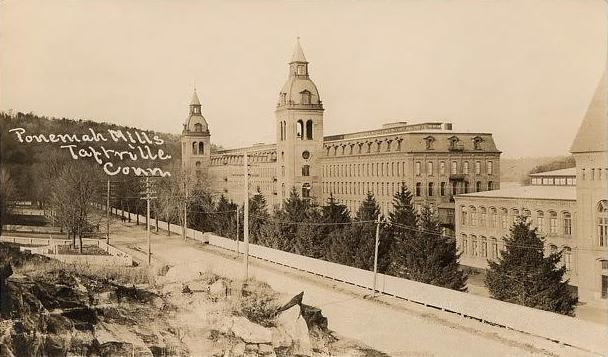
- Ponemah Mills in 1907

- Location within Connecticut Location within the United States
- Location: North of Norwich at Route 93 and Route 97 in Norwich, Connecticut
- Coordinates: 41°34′4″N 72°2′57″W
- Area: 110 acres (45 ha)
- Built: 1866
- Architect: Multiple
- Architectural style: Mid 19th Century Revival, Second Empire
- NRHP reference No.: 78002878
- Added to NRHP: December 1, 1978

Taftville is a small village in eastern Connecticut, United States. It is a neighborhood of Norwich but has its own post office (ZIP Code 06380). It was established in 1866 as site for the large Taftville Mill, later Ponemah Mill. The village is listed on the National Register of Historic Places as Taftville and as alternative name Taftville/Ponemah Mill National Register Historic District.

Currently redevelopment of the large mill is being conducted by The O'Neill Group in conjunction with OneKey LLC. The National Park Service will oversee the historic preservation of the structure, to ensure the historic elements are sustained. The 430,000-square-foot (40,000 m^{2}) Ponemah Mill is being converted into luxury apartments and commercial space.

== History of the Ponemah Mills ==
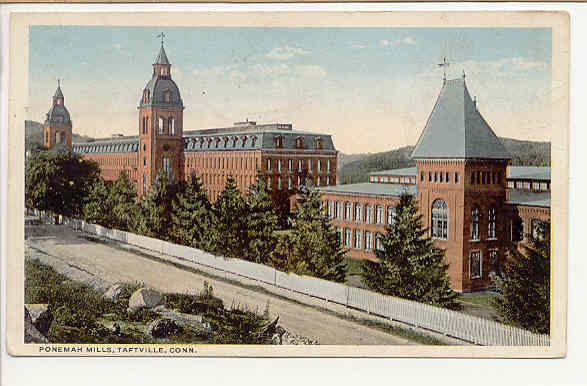
Ponemah Mills, about 1918

The Ponemah Mills, a cotton textile factory, was built on the Shetucket River where a large dam could be built to provide power. The large mill building (Building No. 1) was purported to be the largest weave-shed under one roof at that time. The original workers were predominantly Irish immigrants, and they were hard hit by the depression of the 1870s that began with the Panic of 1873. Unemployment rose and wages dropped appreciably from 1873 to 1875, causing bitter relations between workers and management in many places.

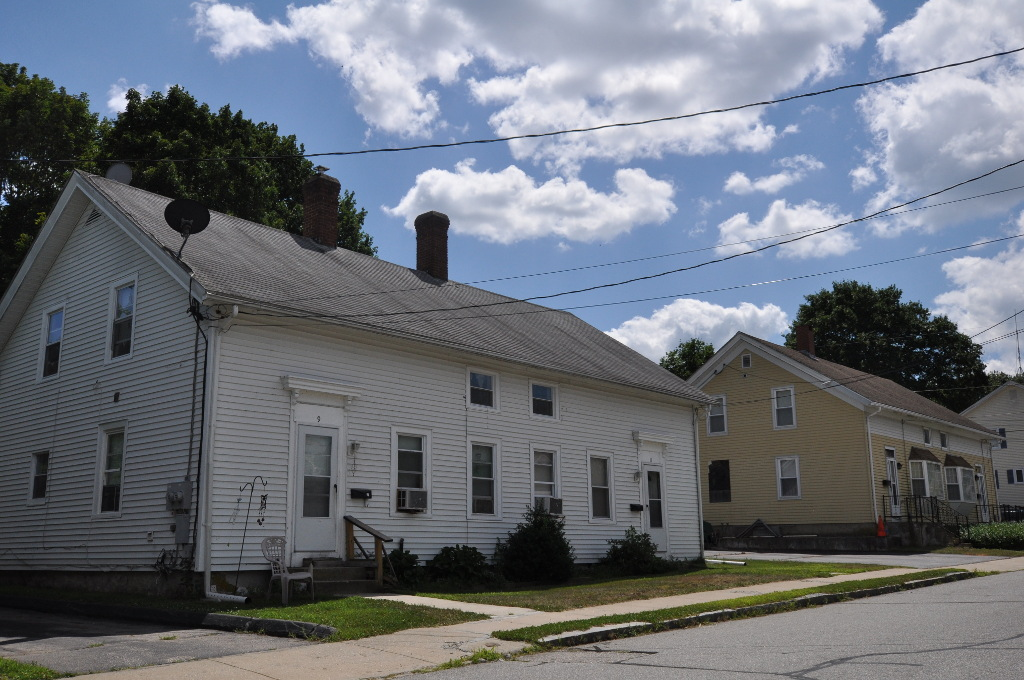
Mill housing in Taftville

In April 1875, the 1,200 workers went on strike. The mill owners had raised rents in company-owned housing as well as prices at the company-owned store. Wages at the time were under $10 for a 67-hour work week. In one often-cited anecdote, a workingman said he and his daughter had worked full-time for more than three months but only had four dollars between them to show for it. The immediate cause of the strike was a pay cut of 12 percent in an attempt to stop unionization. Workers were told half of the pay cut would be restored to anyone who had not participated in trying to form a union at the company.

The company replaced the workers with French Canadians, who would come to number more than 70 percent of the population. Workers were evicted from company-owned housing, and the Connecticut General Assembly passed a strict "tramp law" aimed at workers (such as those from Taftville) who became drifters after their strikes were broken.

Ponemah Mills operated for about 100 years. It sat abandoned for over 40 years until being redeveloped into residential apartments.

A similar mill and village community is Wauregan Historic District, which is also NRHP-listed.

== Local institutions ==
Taftville has a public elementary school operated by the Norwich Public School System called Wequonnoc Magnet Elementary School and a private elementary school called Sacred Heart School. Students then attend Kelly Middle School. After graduating from there, they move on to either Norwich Free Academy, Norwich Technical High School, or other surrounding high schools.

There are two churches: Sacred Heart Roman Catholic Church and the Taftville Congregational Church.

== Notable people, past and present ==
Among the more accomplished Taftville residents was Ned (Edward) Hanlon who managed the Pittsburgh Alleghenys (1889), Pittsburgh Burghers (1890), Baltimore Orioles (1892–1898), Brooklyn Superbas (1899–1905), and the Cincinnati Reds (1906–1907). He was inducted into the Baseball Hall of Fame in 1996. Another ballplayer was the Quebec-born right fielder, Augustine "Lefty" Dugas, whose family settled in Taftville. He played for the Pirates, Philadelphia Phillies and Washington Senators between 1930 and 1934.

In the academic arena Saunders Mac Lane was the son of the Minister of the Taftville Congregational Church and a mathematician of world note, who spent his career at the University of Chicago, Yale and Harvard. He was the co-author of A Survey of Modern Algebra, a book which was the standard work in that field for many years.

== See also ==
- Neighborhoods of Norwich, Connecticut
- National Register of Historic Places listings in New London County, Connecticut
- Ponemah Mills 1894 electric locomotive No. 1386 at Connecticut Trolley Museum
