= Stamford High School (Stamford, Connecticut) =

Location
- 55 Strawberry Hill Avenue; Stamford, Connecticut 06902; United States; 41°03′43″N 73°31′55″W

Information
- Type: Public
- Established: 1873 (153 years ago)
- CEEB code: 070750
- Principal: Matthew Forker
- Teaching staff: 161.30 (FTE)
- Enrollment: 2,121 (2023–2024)
- Student to teacher ratio: 13.15
- Colors: Orange and black
- Mascot: Black Knight
- Website: www.stamfordhigh.org

Stamford High School is a high school, founded in 1873, in Stamford, Connecticut. It is one of three public high schools in the Stamford Public Schools district, along with Westhill High School and Academy of Information Technology and Engineering (AITE).

== History ==
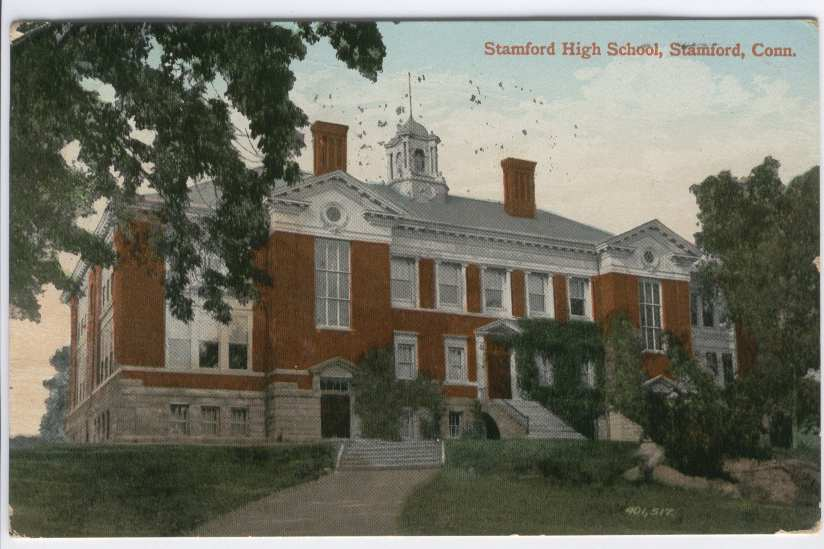
Postcard from about 1910 of the school building on Forest Street

In 1878 the Stamford Town Committee decided to create a high school for the growing community after deciding there was the lack of sufficient secondary education. They created Stamford High School the following year in a single rented room. Students attending SHS starting in 1874 had one teacher who taught reading, spelling, arithmetic, grammar, history, and philosophy. Drawing, Latin, Greek, physical geography, and geometry were added to the curriculum in 1876.

In 1881 four young women comprised the first graduating class. By 1886 increasing enrollment forced a move into a new four-room building on the site of the former Franklin Elementary School. Ten years later, in 1896, a new high school building was completed on Forest Street. To attend, students were required to pass entrance examinations in five subjects, and out of 40 applicants, only 15 were accepted. SHS gradually relaxed its requirements, and by 1905, entrance examinations were eliminated. The multiplying number of students at SHS once again made a move necessary.

The school moved from the site of the since-demolished Burdick Junior High School to its present location on Strawberry Hill Avenue in 1928. SHS now consists of three buildings which house over 100 regular classrooms along with special rooms for science labs, computer labs and shops for woodworking and automobile-repair classes.

With the start of the new school year in September 2006, a $21 million addition to the building was opened after 18 months of construction. The 62,000-square-foot (5,800 m^{2}) addition has 22 classrooms, five science labs, a computer lab, a multi-purpose room, a gymnasium and locker rooms. The addition also features wireless computer access and a drop-off area for entering students near Strawberry Hill Avenue.

The new addition was part of $59 million in upgrades for the school begun in 1997, including replacing four boilers, new roofs and expanding the school cafeteria by 3,000 square feet (280 m^{2}). Increasing enrollment in the city school system spurred the upgrades, and Westhill High School also received them.

== Sports ==
Stamford High School offers 24 varsity sports. These include football, boys' and girls' soccer, boys' and girls' cross country, cheerleading, volleyball, girls' swimming, and field hockey in the fall; boys' and girls' basketball, ice hockey, wrestling, boys' and girls' indoor track, cheerleading, and boys' swimming in the winter; and baseball, softball, boys' and girls' tennis, boys' and girls' track, boys' and girls' lacrosse, and golf in the spring.

== Traditions ==
Each year on December 7, a 9-by-17-foot American flag that flew over the USS Arizona Memorial is to be flown from the flagpole in front of the school as part of a memorial ceremony for Pearl Harbor Day. Everett Hyland, an alumnus of the school who was wounded in the attack, donated the flag in 2007 on condition that it be raised each year on that date. At the first ceremony, in 2007, a small group of veterans attended, some of them speaking to the school's students about the event. "It's one thing to read a book that 2,400 people died," Doug MacLehose, head of the school's history department, told a newspaper reporter. "Talking to someone who was there or can remember is very powerful."

== Notable people ==
=== Alumni ===
- Craig Bingham, football player for Pittsburgh Steelers and San Diego Chargers
- Garry Cobb, football player for Dallas Cowboys, Philadelphia Eagles and Detroit Lions
- Bob Crane, actor, radio personality, star of Hogan's Heroes
- Michael Dante, actor
- Tony DiPreta, comic book and comic strip artist
- Vladimir Ducasse, football player for the New York Jets
- Fred Dugan, football player for San Francisco 49ers, Dallas Cowboys and Washington Redskins
- Devin Gaines, attracted international media attention by earning five bachelor's degrees simultaneously
- Ina Garten, cook, author, and host of the Barefoot Contessa
- Robert Hunter, lyricist for the Grateful Dead
- Jimmy Ienner, music producer
- Stephanie Izard, Season 4 winner of Bravo Network show Top Chef
- Alex Joseph, football player for the Green Bay Packers
- Edward Calvin Kendall, 1950 Nobel Prize in Physiology or Medicine
- J. Walter Kennedy, Stamford mayor and first commissioner of National Basketball Association
- Dan Levy, comedian
- Joseph Lieberman, United States Senator, former vice presidential candidate
- Lois Long, journalist
- Dan Malloy, 88th Governor of Connecticut
- Andrew J. McDonald, Connecticut State Senator
- Bruce Miller, Golden globe and Emmy Award winning Writer/Producer, Handmaid’s Tale, Eureka
- Dan Naturman, comedian
- Christopher John O'Neill, actor/comedian known for his comedy duo The Chris and Paul Show
- Candace Owens, conservative commentator.
- Andy Robustelli, football player for the New York Giants
- Johnny Scalzi, MLB player (Boston Braves)

=== Teachers ===
- Alice Mary Dowd (1855–1943), educator, author

== See also ==
- Education in Stamford, Connecticut
- Westhill High School
- Trinity Catholic High School
