= Wright High School =

Wright High School may refer to:

- C. Milton Wright High School, Bel Air, Maryland
- J. M. Wright Technical High School, Stamford, Connecticut
- Murray-Wright High School, Detroit, Michigan
- Philemon Wright High School, Gatineau, Quebec
- Sophie B. Wright Charter School, also known as Wright High School, New Orleans, Louisiana
- Wright City High School, Wright City, Missouri
