= Miguel Cardona =

American educator (born 1975)

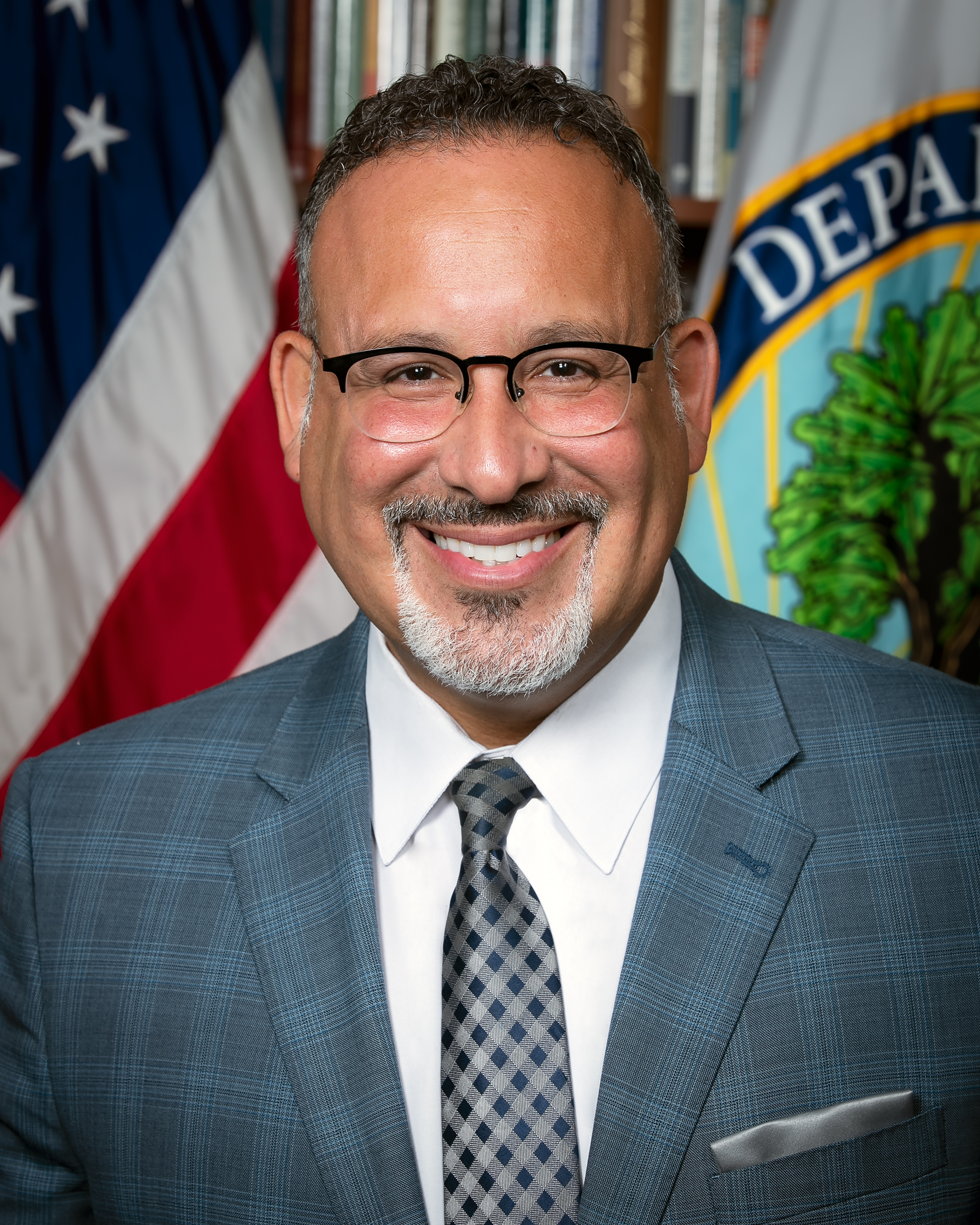
- Official portrait, 2021

12th United States Secretary of Education
- In office March 2, 2021 – January 20, 2025
- President: Joe Biden
- Deputy: Cindy Marten
- Preceded by: Betsy DeVos
- Succeeded by: Linda McMahon

Education Commissioner of Connecticut
- In office August 8, 2019 – March 1, 2021
- Governor: Ned Lamont
- Preceded by: Dianna Wentzell
- Succeeded by: Charlene Russell-Tucker

Personal details
- Born: Miguel Angel Cardona; July 11, 1975 (age 51) Meriden, Connecticut, U.S.
- Party: Democratic
- Spouse: Marissa Pérez (m. 2002)
- Children: 2
- Education: Central Connecticut State University (BS); University of Connecticut (MS, SYC, EdD)
- Cardona's voice Cardona on his vision for the Education Department post-COVID-19 pandemic. Recorded January 27, 2022

Miguel Angel Cardona (born July 11, 1975) is an American educator who served as the 12th United States Secretary of Education under President Joe Biden from March 2, 2021 to January 20, 2025. A member of the Democratic Party, he was confirmed by the U.S. Senate by a vote of 64–33 on March 1, 2021. Cardona previously served as commissioner of the Connecticut State Department of Education from 2019 to 2021.

A native of Meriden, Connecticut, Cardona began his career as a fourth-grade teacher at Israel Putnam Elementary School in Meriden. In 2003, at the age of twenty-seven, he was named principal of Meriden's Hanover School, making him the youngest principal in the state.

== Early life and education ==
Miguel Cardona was born on July 11, 1975, in Meriden, Connecticut, to Puerto Rican parents. Cardona grew up speaking Spanish as his first language and started to learn English when entering kindergarten. His father is a retired police officer in Meriden. Cardona was raised in a housing project in Meriden and graduated from the H.C. Wilcox Technical High School, where he was a part of the automotive studies program. He visits his Alma Mater frequently, recently being the guest speaker for the class of 2023.

Cardona earned a Bachelor of Science in education from Central Connecticut State University in New Britain, CT in 1997. He obtained a Master of Science in bilingual and bicultural education at University of Connecticut (UConn) in 2001. In 2004, he completed a professional sixth year certification at UConn where he earned a doctor of education in 2011.

Cardona's dissertation, titled Sharpening the Focus of Political Will to Address Achievement Disparities, studied the gaps between English-language learners and their classmates. His doctoral major advisor was Barry G. Sheckley and his associate advisor was Casey D. Cobb.

== Career ==
Cardona began his career as a fourth-grade teacher at Israel Putnam Elementary School in Meriden, Connecticut. In 2003, at Hanover Elementary School, he was promoted and made the youngest principal in the state's history for ten years. From 2015 to 2019, Cardona served as assistant superintendent for teaching and learning in his home town.

Cardona was also an adjunct professor of education in the University of Connecticut's Department of Educational Leadership. During his career, he has focused on closing gaps between English-language learners and their peers.

In August 2019, Governor Ned Lamont appointed Cardona as commissioner of education; Cardona was the first Latino to hold the position. During his tenure, Cardona helped oversee state schools' response to the COVID-19 pandemic, where he expressed concerns over the long-term mental health impacts of remote education on students.

== Secretary of Education (2021–2025) ==
=== Nomination and confirmation ===
In December 2020, Cardona emerged as a candidate for United States secretary of education in Joe Biden's cabinet. Biden began to lean toward Cardona over two other "high-profile" teachers' union leaders, Lily Eskelsen García and Randi Weingarten. By choosing Cardona over the two, Biden "appeared to have sidestepped any sibling rivalry between the NEA and AFT."

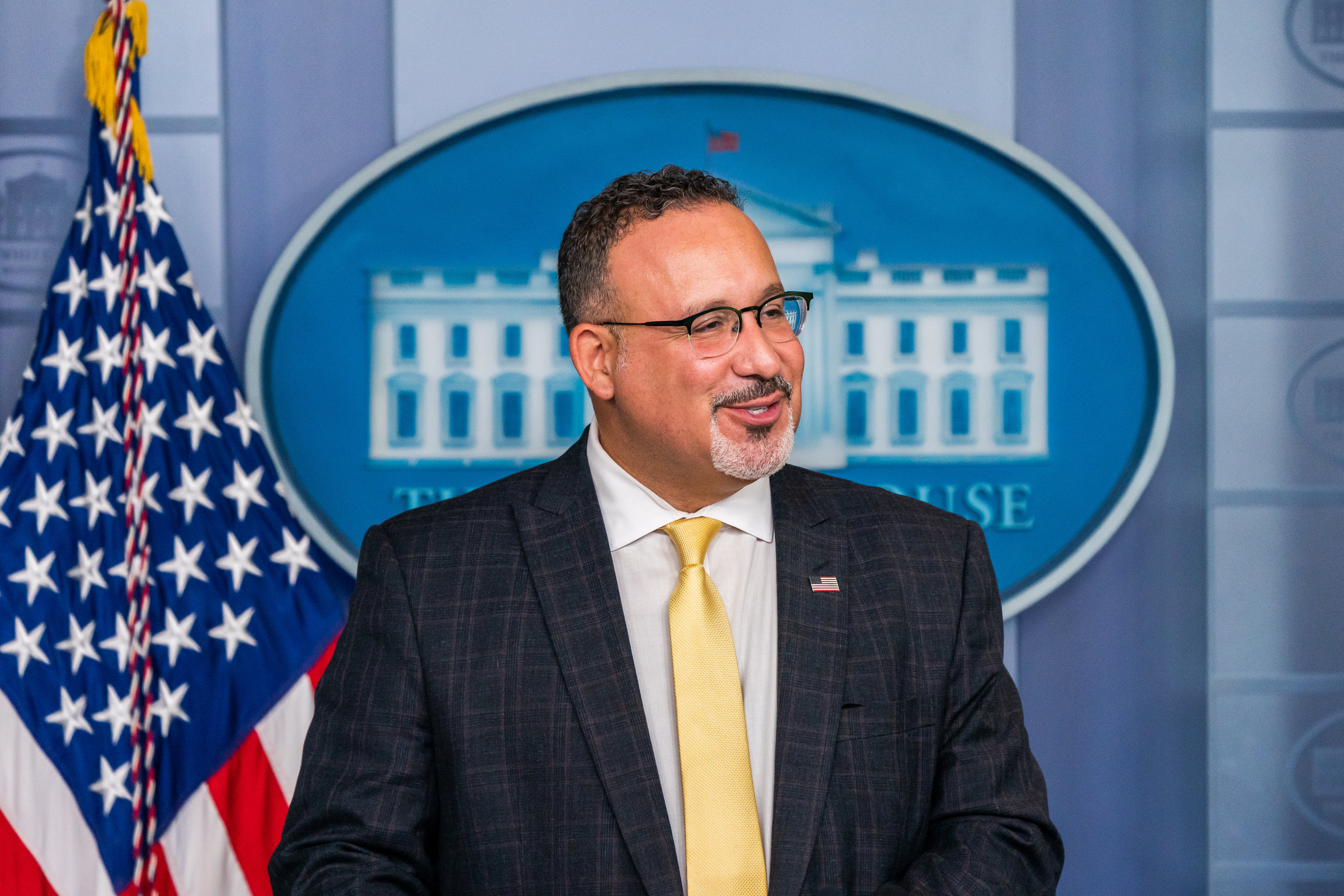
Cardona talks with reporters during a press briefing on August 5, 2021, at the White House.

Cardona was brought to the attention of Biden by Linda Darling-Hammond, the leader of the transition's education secretary search efforts, a role she also filled for Barack Obama in 2008. Darling-Hammond and Cardona had worked together on numerous projects. Politico noted that "Hispanic lawmakers are stressing in particular the need for a Latina to join the administration."

Cardona appeared before the Senate Committee on Health, Education, Labor and Pensions on February 3, 2021. On February 25, his nomination was advanced by the Senate on a cloture vote of 66–32. Cardona was confirmed on March 1, 2021, by a 64–33 vote. Cardona took his oath of office on March 1, 2021, and was ceremonially sworn in by Vice President Kamala Harris on March 2, 2021.

=== Tenure ===
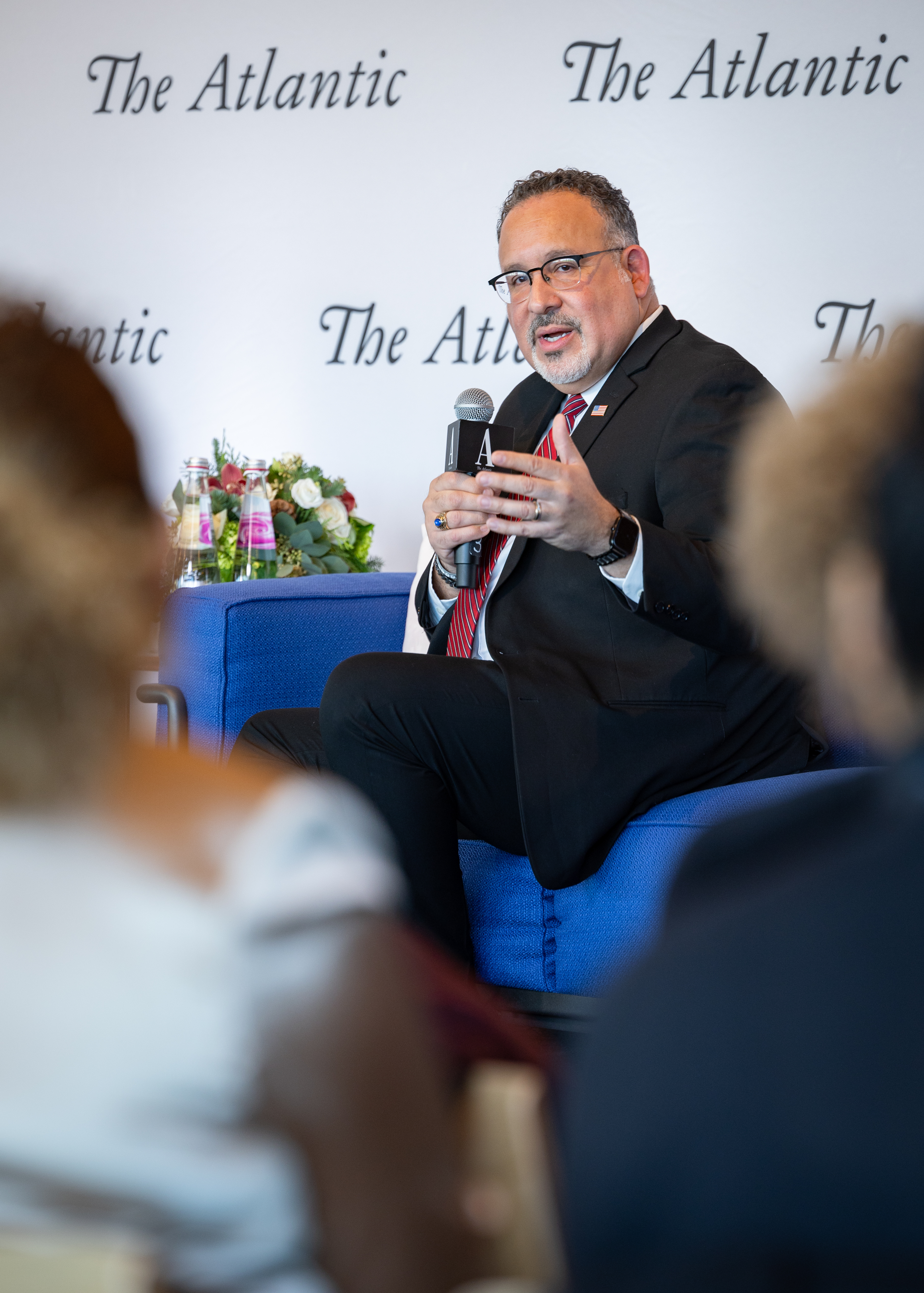
Cardona speaks on a panel hosted by The Atlantic in December 2023.

Throughout his tenure as Secretary of Education, Cardona was responsible for implementing several forms of forgiveness for student loans. The administration's most sweeping attempt to do so, which would have forgiven about $430 billion in student loan principles, was struck down by the Supreme Court on June 30, 2023, in Biden v. Nebraska. Following the Biden v. Nebraska decision, Cardona announced a series of smaller and more targeted student loan forgiveness programs, and the Department of Education has reemphasized the Public Service Loan Forgiveness program to reduce the student debt of people working full-time in public service. In December 2023, Cardona announced that the administration had forgiven about $132 billion of student debt in its first three years. At President Joe Biden’s 2024 State of The Union, Cardona was the designated survivor.

In December 2023, simplified Free Application for Federal Student Aid (FAFSA) forms were released after a two-month delay. By late March 2024, there was a backlog of 6 million applications. On April 26, the Education Department announced that the top official in charge of federal financial student aid would step down. Colleges across the country were obliged to delay their decision deadlines as students were still waiting for financial aid offers. On April 30, Cardona was questioned at a congressional hearing about the troubled introduction of the new form. On May 7, Cardona apologized at another congressional hearing.

== Personal life ==
In 2002, Cardona married Marissa Pérez, a family-school liaison. Pérez was named Miss Connecticut in 2001 and Miss Connecticut Teen USA in 1996. Cardona and his wife have two children: a son, Miguel Jr., and a daughter, Celine. Cardona is Catholic.

Political offices
| Preceded by Dianna Wentzell | Education Commissioner of Connecticut; 2019–2021 | Succeeded by Charlene Russell-Tucker |
| Preceded by Betsy DeVos | United States Secretary of Education; 2021–2025 | Succeeded by Linda McMahon |
U.S. order of precedence (ceremonial)
| Preceded by Jennifer Granholm as Former U.S. Cabinet Member | Order of precedence of the United States as Former U.S. Cabinet Member | Succeeded by Gina Raimondo as Former U.S. Cabinet Member |
