= Westhill High School (Connecticut) =

Coordinates: 41°05′26″N 73°33′56″W

Location
- 125 Roxbury Road; Stamford, Connecticut 06902; United States

Information
- Type: Public
- Established: 1972 (54 years ago)
- CEEB code: 070751
- Principal: Michael Rinaldi
- Teaching staff: 170.00 (FTE)
- Enrollment: 2,259 (2023–2024)
- Student to teacher ratio: 13.29
- Colors: Purple and Gold
- Mascot: Viking
- Team name: Vikings
- Website: www.westhillweb.com

Westhill High School is a high school located in Stamford, Connecticut, United States. It is located on Roxbury Road, in the northern section of Stamford. Westhill is one of three large public high schools in Stamford, CT, the others being AITE and Stamford High School, the latter being a notable sports rival. A number of public middle schools pool into Westhill High School. Westhill is a diverse high school, representing more than thirty-five distinct nationalities amongst its student body.

== Courses ==
Westhill offers general, college preparatory, honors, and Advanced Placement (AP) classes in the social sciences, the natural sciences, literature, language, and history. Westhill offers language classes including Spanish, French, and Italian. The ECE (Early College Experience) program allows Westhill students to earn credits from the University of Connecticut (UConn) that are transferable to most colleges nationwide. The agriscience program also allows students to take advanced courses that are relevant to the field.

== Extracurricular activities and clubs ==
Westhill High School is home to the Northstar Playmakers, the Mock Trial and Debate Team, over twenty distinct sports teams, and a number of community-service oriented organizations. Westhill participates in the Connecticut Interscholastic Athletic Conference.

Westhill High School’s Boys' Lacrosse team has had several members of the 2011 Varsity team go on to play at Division I schools.

== The Westword ==
In the 2003-2004 academic year, the school newspaper, The Westword launched an online edition.

== Notable alumni ==
- Keith Bennett (born 1961), American-Israeli basketball player
- Dave Dresden, EDM DJ and record producer; one half of Gabriel & Dresden
- Zach Tyler Eisen, voice actor
- Pamela Karlan, civil rights lawyer; professor at Stanford University
- Dannel Malloy, governor of Connecticut
- Mark Parker, CEO of Nike
- Dave Racaniello, Bullpen Catcher for the New York Mets
- Bruce Shapiro, journalist; Director of the Dart Center for Journalism and Trauma, Columbia University
- Barry Sternlicht, CEO of Starwood Capital Group; Chairman of Starwood Property Trust (REIT); philanthropist
- David Streitfeld, reporter for The New York Times
- Mary Beth Barone, actress and comedian
