= Vladimir Ducasse =

Haitian-born American football player (born 1987)

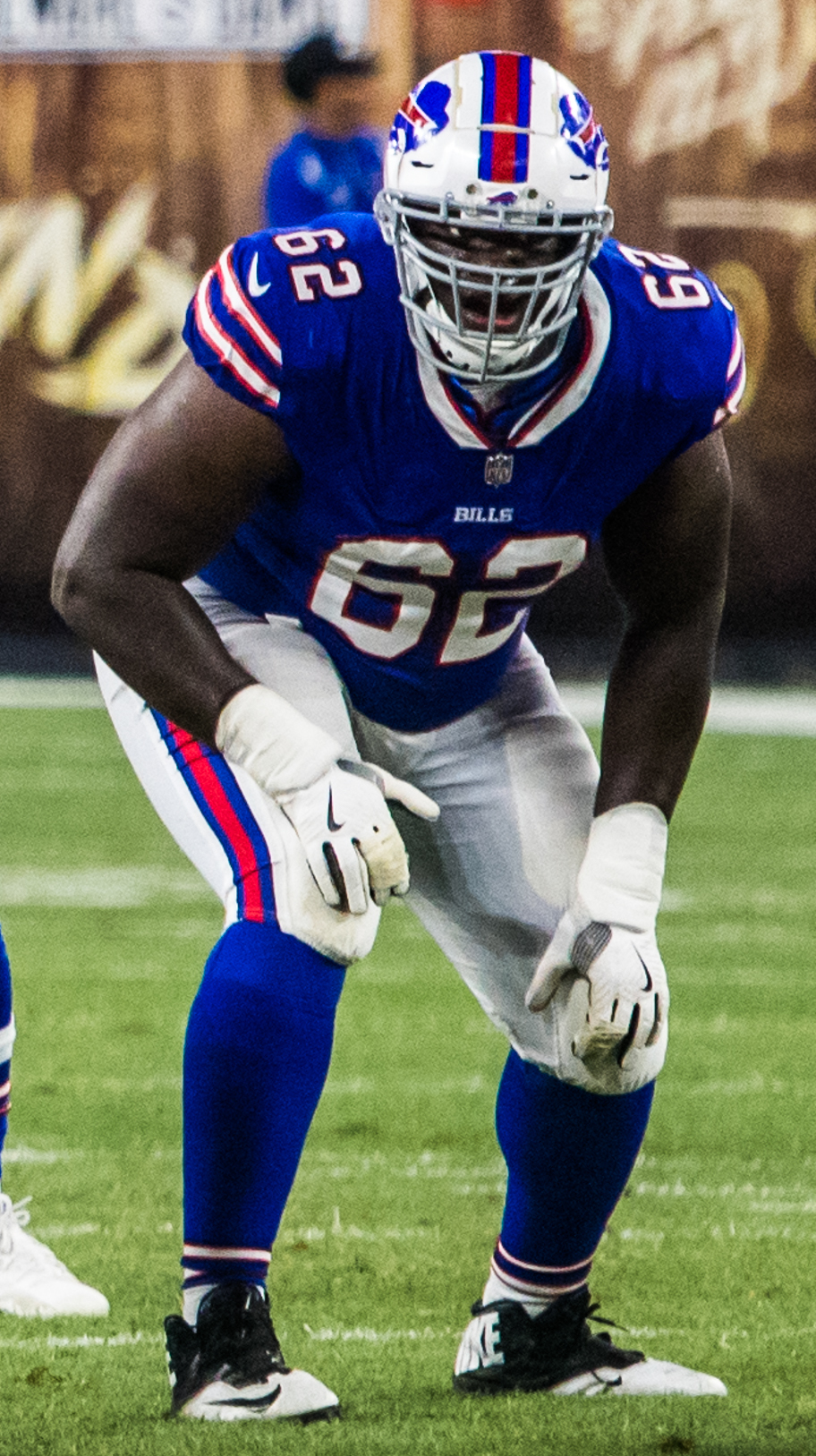
- Ducasse with the Buffalo Bills in 2018

No. 62
- Position: Guard

Personal information
- Born: October 15, 1987 (age 39); Port-au-Prince, Haiti
- Listed height: 6 ft 5 in (1.96 m)
- Listed weight: 329 lb (149 kg)

Career information
- High school: Stamford (Stamford, Connecticut, U.S.)
- College: Massachusetts
- NFL draft: 2010: 2nd round, 61st overall pick

Career history
- New York Jets (2010–2013); Minnesota Vikings (2014); Chicago Bears (2015); Baltimore Ravens (2016); Buffalo Bills (2017–2018)

Awards and highlights
- 2009 FCS All-American First Team (Associated Press); 2009 CAA All-Conference First Team; 2009 New England Football Writers All-Star; 2008 CAA All-Conference First Team

Career NFL statistics
- Games played: 111
- Games started: 51
- Stats at Pro Football Reference

Vladimir Ducasse (French pronunciation: [vladimiʁ dykas]; born October 15, 1987) is a Haitian-born former American football offensive guard. He was selected by the New York Jets in the second round of the 2010 NFL draft. He played college football at Massachusetts.

== Early life ==
A native of Port-au-Prince, Haiti, Ducasse moved to the United States in 2002. He attended Stamford High School in Stamford, Connecticut, where he was a three-sport star in football, basketball and track. In football, Ducasse played offensive line and was named First Team All-State by the Connecticut High School Coaches Association. He also earned First Team All-Fairfield County by the FCIAC Coaches.

Ducasse was also an standout track & field athlete at Stamford High, where he was one of the state's top performers in the throwing events. He captured the League championship in the discus, with a throw of 44.77 meters (146 ft, 5 in) and was a runner-up in the shot put, with a throw of 16.43 meters (53 ft, 9 in).

Ducasse was not rated by any recruiting service and failed to draw the attention of any Division I Bowl Subdivision college. He chose to attend the University of Massachusetts Amherst.

== College career ==
As a true freshman at UMass, Ducasse saw action in four games as a reserve offensive lineman. In his sophomore year he became the starter at left tackle, started 12 of 13 games in 2007 and aided UMass' line in allowing just 15 quarterback sacks in his 12 games. In his junior season, Ducasse started all games at left tackle and was part of offensive line that allowed just six sacks, the fewest in the Colonial Athletic Association and second in the NCAA.

Ducasse finished his career with 35 consecutive starts at left tackle. In those 35 games, UMass allowed just 39 sacks and had a 100-yard rusher in 23 of those games. He was named a FCS First Team All-American by the Associated Press.

== Professional career ==
=== Pre-draft ===
Ducasse was considered one of the best offensive guard prospects available in the 2010 NFL draft. He worked out at TEST Sports Clubs in Martinsville, New Jersey in order to prepare himself for the NFL combine. He scored 13 on the Wonderlic intelligence test.

Pre-draft measurables
Height	Weight	Arm length	Hand span	40-yard dash	10-yard split	20-yard split	20-yard shuttle	Three-cone drill	Vertical jump	Broad jump	Bench press	Wonderlic
6 ft 4 3/8 in (1.94 m)	332 lb (151 kg)	34 3/4 in (0.88 m)	9 5/8 in (0.24 m)	5.27 s	1.77 s	3.04 s	4.97 s	8.25 s	26 in (0.66 m)	7 ft 7 in (2.31 m)	29 reps	13
All values from NFL Combine

=== New York Jets ===
Ducasse was selected in the second round (61st overall) by the New York Jets, as the first non-BCS-eligible player drafted in 2010. He is the first UMass football player drafted by the NFL since linebacker Khari Samuel in 1999, and the highest Minuteman taken since Greg Landry was the 11th pick overall by the Detroit Lions in the 1968 NFL/AFL draft.

The Jets released Pro Bowl guard Alan Faneca after they selected Ducasse. Ducasse and Matt Slauson, a second-year backup, competed for Faneca's old job in training camp that season. On July 7, he was signed by the Jets to a four-year deal worth $3.25 million, including a signing bonus just over $1 million. Ducasse played two games during his rookie year in 2010. In 2011, he played all 16 games and made one start. In 2012, Ducasse again appeared all 16 games playing left guard and right tackle. In all, he started only five games for the Jets.

After performing well in training camp, Ducasse earned the starting job at left guard during the 2013 NFL season. However, due to penalties and struggles, Ducasse was benched in favor for rookie Brian Winters. Ducasse played in all 16 games with 4 starts for the 2013 season. He became a free agent for the first time in his career after the season ended.

=== Minnesota Vikings ===
Ducasse signed a one-year contract with the Minnesota Vikings on March 24, 2014.

=== Chicago Bears ===
Ducasse signed a one-year contract with the Chicago Bears on March 16, 2015.

=== Baltimore Ravens ===
Ducasse signed with the Baltimore Ravens on May 16, 2016. On September 3, 2016, he was released by the Ravens. He was re-signed on October 11, 2016.

=== Buffalo Bills ===
On March 9, 2017, Ducasse signed a three-year contract with the Buffalo Bills. After being inactive the first four games, Ducasse started the rest of the season at right guard in 2017.

Ducasse was named the starting left guard to begin the 2018 season. He started the first nine games before losing the starting job to rookie Wyatt Teller.

On August 11, 2019, Ducasse was released by the Bills.

== Personal life ==
Vladimir Ducasse is the son of Delinois Ducasse, an accountant for the Banque de la République d'Haïti. His mother died when he was 5. He has two older brothers, Reginald and Macarthur, and two younger siblings, Jefferey and Jemima. Vladimir and Macarthur moved to Connecticut in 2002 to live with his aunt and uncle Virginia and Lezanord Ducasse while Reginald moved to Beijing, China to study computer science. The rest of his family still resides in Haiti and was affected by the 2010 earthquake.
