= Oliver Wolcott Technical High School =

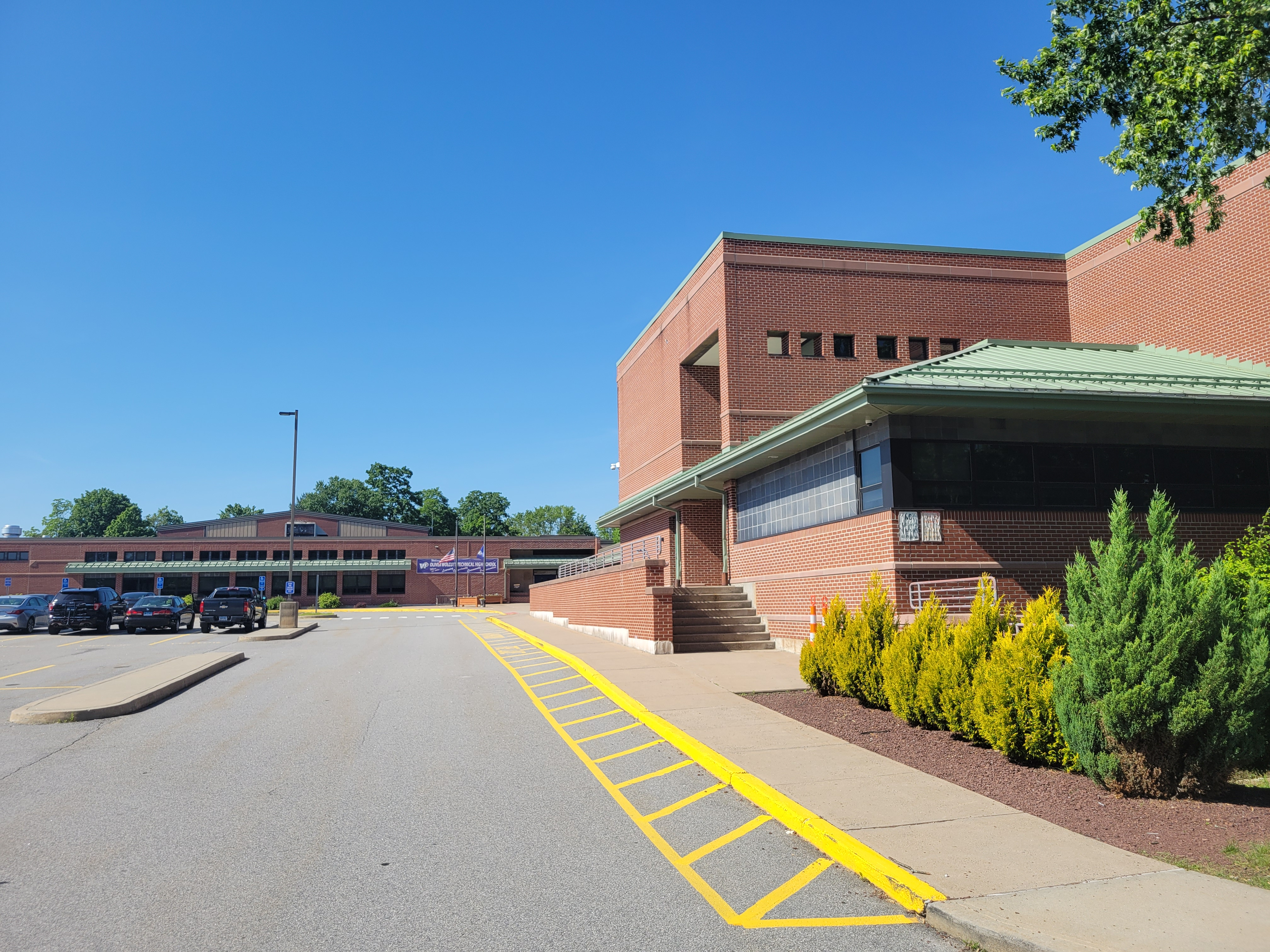
- Oliver Wolcott Technical High School

Location
- 75 Oliver Street; Torrington, Connecticut 06790; United States
- Coordinates: 41°48′40″N 73°06′43″W

Information
- CEEB code: 070793
- Principal: Richard Shellman
- Teaching staff: 53.10 (FTE)
- Enrollment: 648 (2023-2024)
- Student to teacher ratio: 12.20
- Mascot: Wildcat
- Website: wolcott.cttech.org

Oliver Wolcott Technical High School, Wolcott Tech, or OWTS is a technical high school located in Torrington, Connecticut. It is in the Connecticut Technical Education and Career System. Wolcott Tech receives students from many nearby towns. In 2015, the school received a 153 million dollar grant for a new building to replace the original built more than 60 years ago.
