= H. H. Ellis Technical High School =

Location
- 613 Upper Maple Street; Danielson, Connecticut 06239; United States
- Coordinates: 41°49′14″N 71°53′34″W

Information
- Established: 1916 (110 years ago)
- CEEB code: 070133
- Principal: Jennifer Jarmon
- Teaching staff: 56.50 (FTE)
- Grades: 9-12
- Enrollment: 650 (2023-2024)
- Student to teacher ratio: 11.50
- Colors: Blue and gold
- Mascot: Ellis Tech Eagle
- Team name: Golden Eagles
- Website: ellis.cttech.org
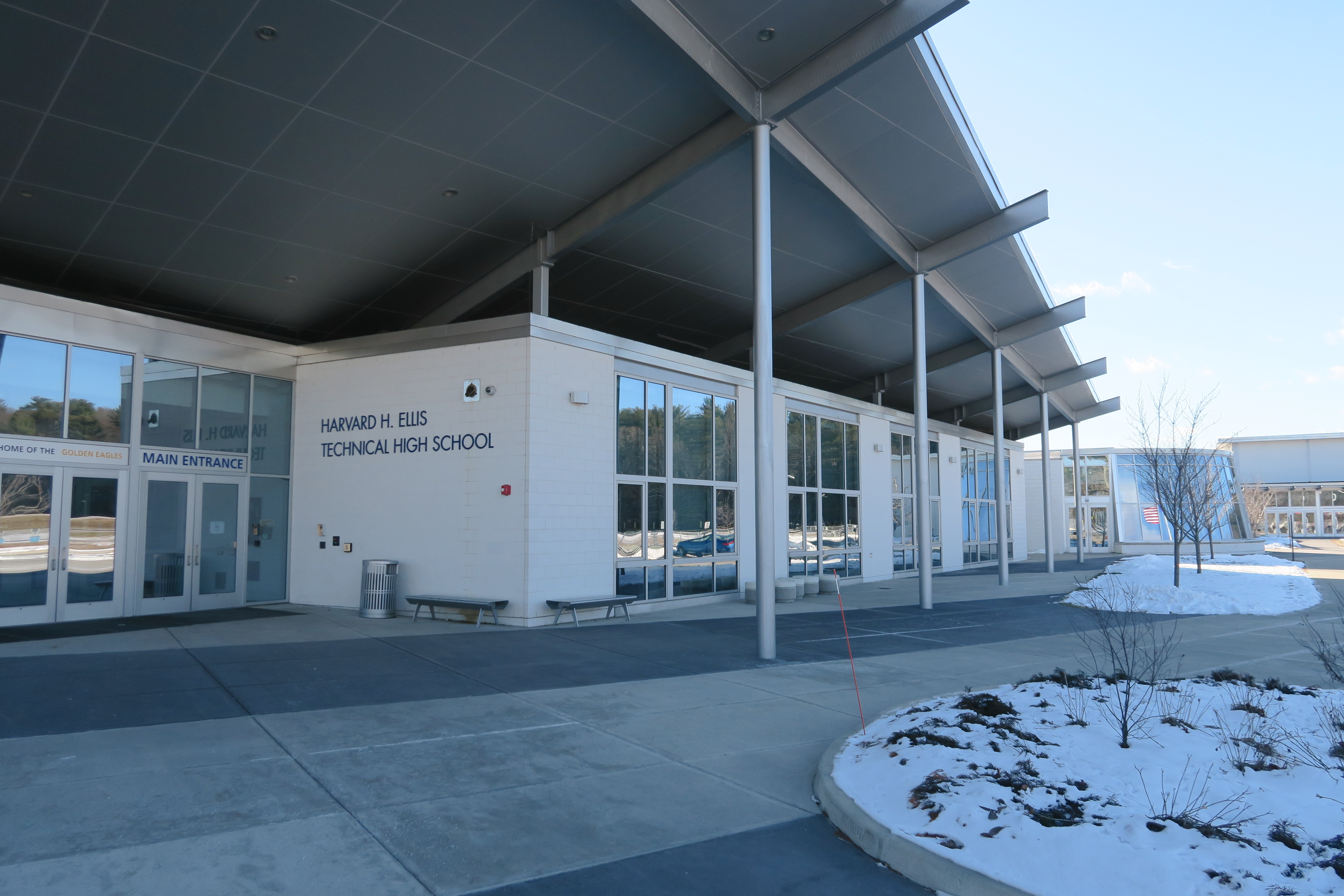

Harvard H. Ellis Technical High School, or Ellis Tech, is a technical high school located in Danielson, Connecticut. It is part of the Connecticut Technical Education and Career System. Founded in 1916 as the Putnam Trade School, it was the first technical school in Connecticut to have its own building. It is in the Connecticut Technical High School System. It receives students from many nearby towns.

The current school building was constructed in 2014. The building underwent renovations to add 30,000 square feet of new floor space as well as a new gymnasium, a classroom wing, a media center, and a culinary arts program space.

== Technologies ==
In addition to a complete academic program leading to a high school diploma, students attending Ellis Tech receive training in one of the following trades and technologies:

- Automotive Collision Repair
- Automotive
- Architecture
- Carpentry
- Culinary Arts
- Electrical
- Robotics & Automation
- Hairdressing and Cosmetology
- Precision Machining Technology
- Masonry
- Plumbing and Heating
- Sustainable architecture

== Athletics ==
Fall Sports:

- Cross Country
- Football
- Soccer
- Volleyball

Winter Sports:

- Boys' and Girls' Basketball
- Wrestling

Spring Sports:

- Baseball
- Golf
- Softball
- Track & Field
