= Norwich Public Schools =

School district in Connecticut, United States

Location
- 90 Town Street; Norwich, CT 06360 United States
- Coordinates: 41.5485164°N 72.0973744°W

District information
- Type: Public
- Motto: Committed to inspiring and engaging learnings to reach their highest potential.
- Grades: K-8, with 9-12 Programs
- Established: 1875
- Superintendent: Susan Lessard
- Schools: 10 schools, 1 transition program, 1 adult education program
- NCES District ID: 0903120

Students and staff
- Students: 3,293
- Teachers: 250
- Staff: 468
- Student–teacher ratio: 13:1

Other information
- Website: norwichpublicschools.org

Norwich Public Schools (NPS, Norwich School District) is the public school system for the town of Norwich, Connecticut. NPS serves approximately 3,600 students every year through 10 school locations within the City of Norwich. running a 9–12 transition academy, a regional adult education program, a child care center, seven elementary schools, two magnet middle schools, and a child care center. 8th-grade graduates are able to various local high school programs, such as Norwich Free Academy, Norwich Technical High School, Ledyard Agri-Science Program, LEARN Regional Magnet Schools, Bacon Academy, Ella T. Grasso Southeastern Technical High School, and other local programs. Norwich Public Schools employs more than 1,000 staff, including teachers and administrators. Norwich Public Schools has been serving the City of Norwich for nearly 150 years, with the opening of its first school in 1875. The John Mason School building, built in 1895, is currently in use as the school system's district office.

== Vision and mission ==
Vision

To enable each child to reach their full potential.

Mission

The Norwich Public Schools will provide each student a rigorous, effective teaching and learning environment where equity is the norm, excellence is the goal, student health and safety is assured.

== List of schools ==
=== Early learning centers ===
As of the 2021-2022 school year

- Bishop Early Learning Center (built 1925, renovated 1999)

=== Elementary schools ===
As of the 2021-2022 school year

- Samuel Huntington Elementary School (built 1928, renovated 1999)
- Thomas W. Mahan Elementary School (built 1968, renovated 1995)
- Veterans Memorial Elementary School (built 1968, renovated 1995)
- John B. Stanton Elementary School (built 1956, renovated 1995)
- Uncas Elementary School (built 1975)
- John M. Moriarty Elementary School (built 1975)
- Wequonnoc Magnet Elementary School (built 1962, renovated 2005)

=== Middle schools ===
As of the 2021–2022 school year

- Teachers' Memorial Middle School (built 1975)
- Kelly Middle School (built 1962, renovated 2010)

=== High schools ===
As of the 2021-2022 school year, Norwich Public Schools does not operate any high schools. Students within the NPS system are allowed to select from a number of local high school options, and by default will move on to Norwich Free Academy. Other options include Norwich Technical High School, Ella T. Grasso Southeastern Technical High School, and Bacon Academy.

=== Transition and adult education programs ===
- Norwich Transition Academy
- Norwich Regional Adult Education

=== Former schools ===
- Norwich High School (converted into Norwich Regional Adult Education Facility, 2007)
- Greeneville Elementary School (closed as of fall 2010)
- Bishop Elementary School (converted into early learning center, 2010)
- William A. Buckingham School (closed, 2011)
- Deborah Tenant-Zinewicz School (converted into Norwich Transition Academy, 2020)

== Population ==
=== 2019–2021 school year ===
District data from 2019–2020 school year

==== Demographics ====
- 1,238 or 34.5% Hispanic
- 1,063 or 29.6% White
- 663 or 18.5% Black
- 363 or 10.1% Multi-racial
- 230 or 6.4% Asian
- 18 or 0.5% Native American

==== Free and reduced lunches ====
- 67% free or reduced, 33% paid

==== Special populations ====
Special education

As of the 2019-2020 school year, 695 students in the district were identified as having disabilities.

== See also ==
- Connecticut v. Amero
