= Vinall =

Vinall is a surname. Notable people with the surname include:

- Jack Vinall (1910–1997), English footballer
- Jasper Vinall (1590–1624), English cricketer
- Jack Vinall (1920–1991), Australian Australian rules footballer
- Olivia Vinall English/Belgian actress

== See also ==
- Vinal (disambiguation)
