= Platt Technical High School =

Coordinates: 41.2523°N 73.0451°W

Location
- 600 Orange Avenue; Milford, Connecticut 06461; United States

Information
- Type: Vocational, State School
- School district: Connecticut Technical High School System
- CEEB code: 070426
- Principal: Thomas Agosto
- Faculty: 98
- Teaching staff: 61.80 (FTE)
- Grades: 9-12
- Enrollment: 780 (2023-2024)
- Student to teacher ratio: 12.62
- Colors: Black and red
- Mascot: Panther
- Newspaper: None
- Website: platt.cttech.org

Platt Technical High School, or Platt Tech, is a technical high school located in Milford, Connecticut, United States. It is part of the Connecticut Technical Education and Career System. Platt Tech receives students from many nearby towns.

== Technologies ==
In addition to a complete academic program leading to a high school diploma, students attending Platt Tech receive training in a trade or technology. The available trades are:

- Architecture
- Automotive Collision Repair and Furnishing
- Automotive Technology
- Carpentry
- Culinary Arts
- Electrical
- Hairdressing and Cosmetology
- Heating, Ventilation, and Air Conditioning (HVAC)
- Information Technology
- Robotics and Automation
- Plumbing and Heating
- Precision Machining Technology (MT)
