= Sacred Heart Academy (Stamford, Connecticut) =

Defunct Catholic school in Connecticut, United States

Coordinates: 41.0670°N 73.5344°W

Location
- 200 Strawberry Hill Avenue; Stamford, Fairfield County, Connecticut; United States

Information
- Religious affiliation: Catholicism
- Established: 1922
- Closed: 2006
- Grades: 9-12
- Gender: Girls

Sacred Heart Academy was a regional, female-only Catholic school for grades 9–12, founded in 1922 under the Roman Catholic Diocese of Bridgeport. It was located at 200 Strawberry Hill Avenue in Stamford, Connecticut and served parts of Fairfield County, Connecticut and Westchester County, New York. It closed in 2006 due to "declining enrollment and financial difficulties."

== See also ==
- Education in Stamford, Connecticut
