= E. C. Goodwin Technical High School =

E.C. Goodwin Technical High School
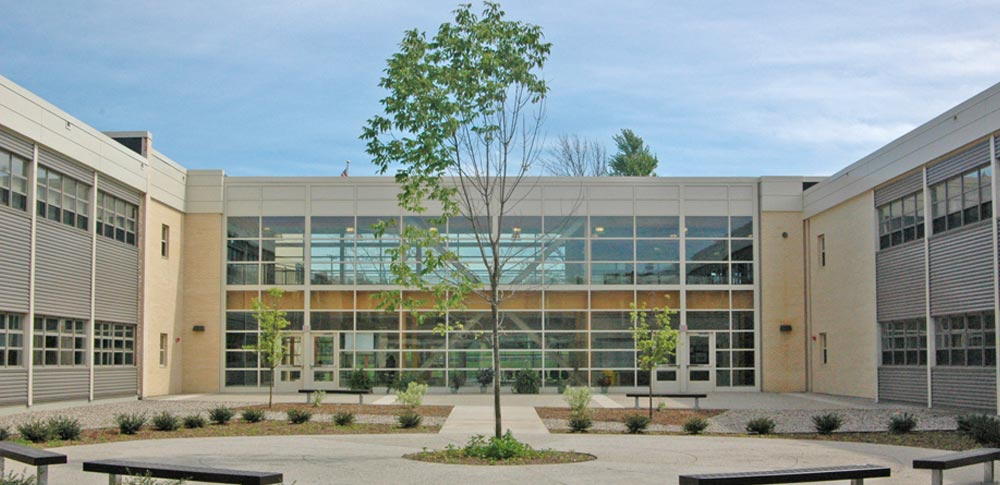

Location
- 735 Slater Road; New Britain, Connecticut 06053; United States; 41°41′10″N 72°48′22″W

Information
- CEEB code: 070445
- Principal: David Telesca
- Teaching staff: 63.10 (FTE)
- Grades: 9-12
- Enrollment: 657 (2023–2024)
- Student to teacher ratio: 10.41
- Mascot: Gladiator
- Website: goodwin.cttech.org

E. C. Goodwin Technical High School, or Goodwin Tech, is a technical high school located in New Britain, Connecticut. It is in the Connecticut Technical Education and Career System. It receives students from many nearby towns.

== Technologies ==
In addition to a complete academic program leading to a high school diploma, students attending Goodwin Tech receive training in one of the following trades and technologies:

*Automotive Technology
- Carpentry
- Culinary Arts
- Electrical
- Hairdressing and Cosmetology
- Heating, Ventilation and Air Conditioning (HVAC)
- Information Systems Technology
- Landscape Design, Installation and Equipment
- Mechanical Design and Engineering Technology
- Health and Medicine Technology
- Plumbing and Heating
- Precision Machining Technology
