= H.C. Wilcox Technical High School =

School in Connecticut, United States

Coordinates: 41.529°N 72.831°W

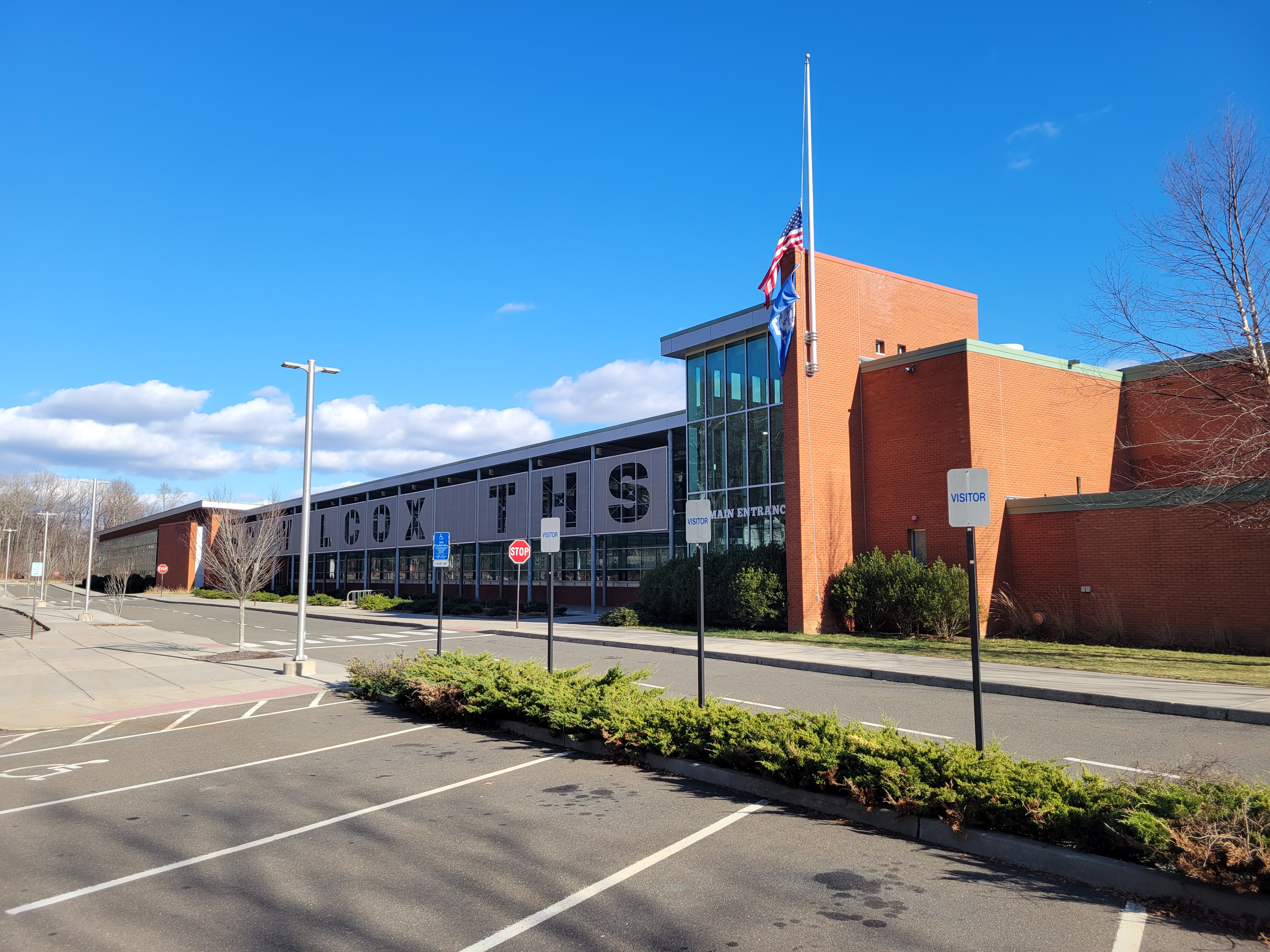

Location
- 298 Oregon Road; Meriden, Connecticut 06451; United States

Information
- Authority: Connecticut Technical Education and Career System
- CEEB code: 070385
- Principal: Gail Lewis
- Teaching staff: 69.30 (FTE)
- Grades: 9-12
- Enrollment: 738 (2023-2024)
- Student to teacher ratio: 10.65
- Colors: Blue and yellow
- Mascot: Wildcat
- Website: wilcox.cttech.org

H.C. Wilcox Technical High School, or Wilcox Tech, is a technical high school located in Meriden, Connecticut, that was first established in 1918. It receives students from many nearby towns. Wilcox Tech is part of the Connecticut Technical Education and Career System. Like many Connecticut Technical High Schools, their decades-old building was recently renovated and expanded, at a cost of $77.5 million, and reopened in the fall of 2014.

== Notable alumni ==
- Miguel Cardona, Class of 1993, educator and United States Secretary of Education
