= Keith Bennett (basketball) =

American-Israeli basketball player

Keith Bennett קית' בנט
Personal information
- Born: April 19, 1961 (age 65) Stamford, Connecticut, U.S.
- Listed height: 6 ft 5 in (1.96 m)
- Listed weight: 175 lb (79 kg)

Career information
- High school: Westhill (Stamford, Connecticut)
- College: Sacred Heart (1979–1983)
- NBA draft: 1983: 7th round, 156th overall pick
- Drafted by: New Jersey Nets
- Position: Guard / forward

Career history
- 1985–1987: Hapoel Ramat Gan
- 1987–1988: Hapoel Jerusalem
- 1988–1991: Hapoel Tel Aviv
- 1991–1992: Hapoel Holon
- 1992–1994: Ironi Nahariya
- 1994–1995: Hapoel Givatayim
- Stats at Basketball Reference

Keith Bennett (קית' בנט; born April 19, 1961) is an American-Israeli former basketball player. He played the guard and forward positions. He played 10 seasons in the Israel Basketball Premier League.

== Biography ==
Bennett was born and raised in Stamford, Connecticut. He is 6 ft 5 in (1.96 m) tall.

He attended Westhill High School. Bennett was named to the 1978–79 New Haven Register All-State boys basketball team, and 1978–79 All-Fairfield County Interscholastic Athletic Conference.

Bennett attended Sacred Heart University, and played for the Sacred Heart Pioneers. In 1983, he became the school's leading career scorer. He was named a National Association of Basketball Coaches Division II All-American in 1981, 1982, and 1983, and Regional Player of the Year in 1982 and 1983.

He was drafted in the 1983 NBA draft in Round 7, Pick 156, by the New Jersey Nets.

Bennett played 10 seasons in the Israel Basketball Premier League for Hapoel Ramat Gan, Hapoel Jerusalem, Hapoel Tel Aviv, Hapoel Holon, Ironi Nahariya, and Hapoel Givatayim. He also played briefly in Argentina.

== Personal life ==
Bennett acquired Israeli citizenship during his playing career. He completed his mandatory service in the Israel Defense Forces with a two-week stint.

Bennett returned to the United States in 1995. In a 2005 interview, he stated he was working in the management of a residential building complex in Virginia. He had not returned to Israel since his playing career but described it as "a second home to me."
