= Rippowam School =

Public high school in Stamford, Connecticut, US

Rippowam High School was once a public high school in Stamford, Connecticut, United States. The school opened in the fall of 1961 as the second high school in the city. The school derived its name from the Native American tribe that inhabited Stamford and the surrounding area before European settlement. The school mascot name was the "Warriors," and the school colors were green and white. The name of its annual yearbook was "Riptide".

Rippowam High School closed after the 1982-1983 school year and reopened as the Rippowam Cluster High School. After the closing of the Cluster High School, the building was used for adult education, temporary locations for both the Hart Elementary School and the Magnet Middle School, which became Scofield Magnet Middle School upon its move in 2001 to its permanent site on Scofieldtown Road (the former campus of the University of Connecticut, Stamford Campus) in North Stamford. Since 2001 its campus has been the permanent site of Rippowam Middle School.

In 2014, the Stamford Board of Education converted a smaller wing of Rippowam Middle School into the APPLES Early Childhood Educational Center, which serves as the city's only public preschool for general education and special education.

The Academy of Information Technology and Engineering (AITE), a regional magnet high school that formerly shared the building with Rippowam Middle School, has occupied its own building behind Rippowam since August 2007.

Rippowam Middle School has a large auditorium, which it still shares with the AITE, and is home to its own drama group. It is also the host school for the city of Stamford's All School Musical that involves every school in the city, from grades 4 to 12. The school's current mascot, the Raptor, was decided by popular vote in its first year as a middle school by the first class of sixth graders.

== Alumni ==
- Marion Meadows, jazz musician
- Bobby Valentine, Major League Baseball player and manager
- Ina Garten, Barefoot Contessa

== A Junior Grade ==
In the year of 2014, Rippowam introduced a new grade, which is 5th grade.
