= Bristol Technical Education Center =

Location
- 431 Minor Street; Bristol, Connecticut 06010; United States
- Coordinates: 41°41′20″N 72°59′24″W

Information
- CEEB code: 070079
- Principal: John Ryan
- Grades: 11-12 and postgraduate
- Enrollment: 158
- Website: bristol.cttech.org

The Bristol Technical Education Center, or Bristol TEC, is a technical school located in Bristol, Connecticut. It is part of the Connecticut Technical Education and Career System. Bristol TEC receives students from many nearby towns.

Unlike other Connecticut technical high schools, 11th and 12th grade students attending Bristol TEC during high school also retain enrollment in their sending schools. If attending Bristol TEC during their senior year, students receive a diploma from their sending school and a training certificate from Bristol TEC.

Bristol TEC offers trade certificates in seven technology areas: Automotive Technology, Culinary Arts, Electronics, Health Technology, HVAC/R (Heating, Ventilation, Air Conditioning and Refrigeration), Manufacturing, and Welding/Metal Fabrication. Students can also earn high school credits in English, math, and social studies. Students may be hired into entry-level positions while still in school via the Work-Based Learning program.

Bristol Technical Education Center is accredited by the New England Association of Schools and Colleges (NEASC) and the Council on Occupational Education (COE).
