= House at 49 Vinal Avenue =

Historic house in Massachusetts, United States

- U.S. National Register of Historic Places
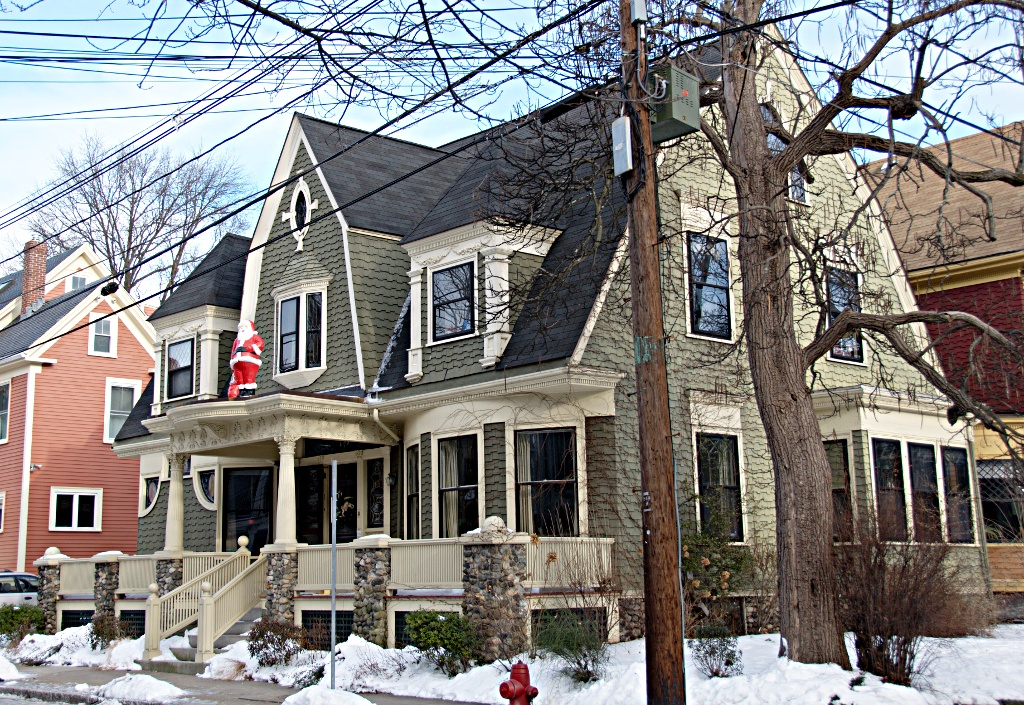

- Location within Massachusetts Location within the United States
- Location: 49 Vinal Ave., Somerville, Massachusetts
- Coordinates: 42°23′5.75″N 71°5′47.58″W
- Built: 1894
- Architectural style: Colonial Revival, Shingle Style
- MPS: Somerville MPS
- NRHP reference No.: 89001292
- Added to NRHP: September 18, 1989

The house at 49 Vinal Avenue in Somerville, Massachusetts is a stylish combination of Colonial Revival and Shingle styling. The 2 1/2-story wood-frame house was built c. 1894. It has a wide gambrel roof with cross gables that are also gambreled. The front cross gable is flanked by two hip roof dormers whose windows are flanked by pilasters and topped by an entablature with wooden garlands and dentil molding. The house is clad in wavy cut shingles, and its windows are topped by tall entablatures. It has a porch running the width of the front facade that is uncovered except for a portico sheltering the front door.

The house was listed on the National Register of Historic Places in 1989.

== See also ==
- House at 42 Vinal Avenue, Somerville, MA
- National Register of Historic Places listings in Somerville, Massachusetts
