= House at 42 Vinal Avenue =

Historic house in Massachusetts, United States

- U.S. National Register of Historic Places
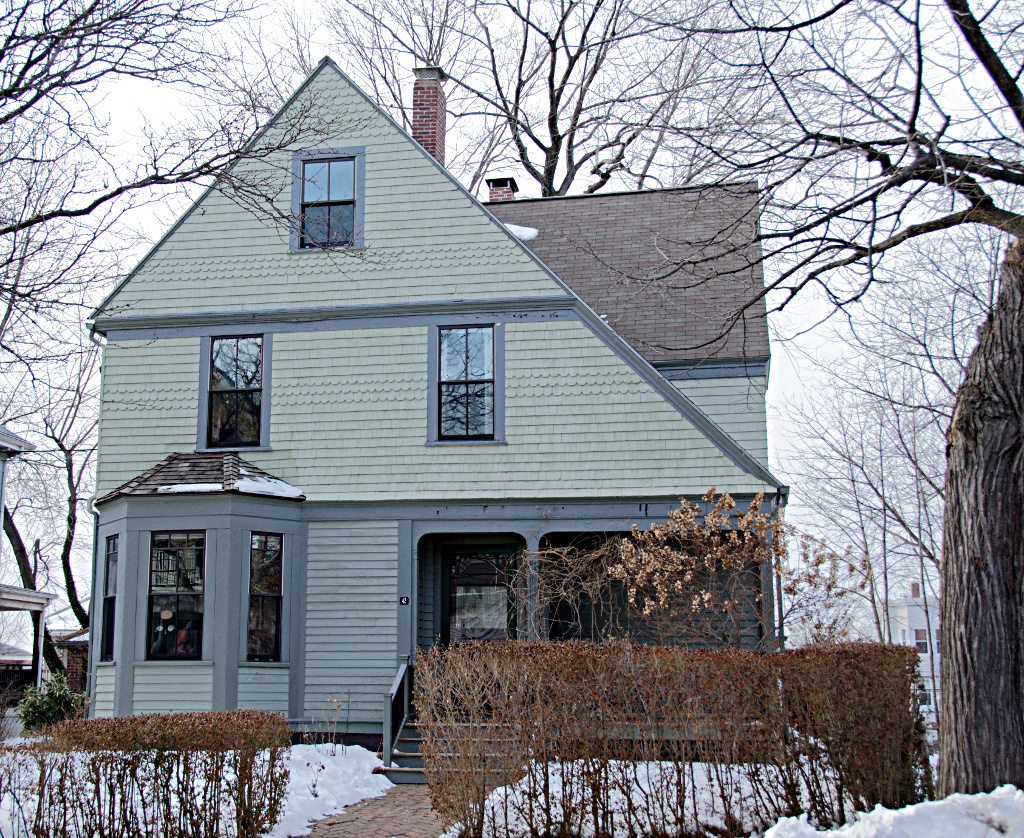

- Location within Massachusetts Location within the United States
- Location: 42 Vinal Ave., Somerville, Massachusetts
- Coordinates: 42°23′4.42″N 71°5′50.03″W
- Built: 1895
- Architectural style: Shingle Style
- MPS: Somerville MPS
- NRHP reference No.: 89001290
- Added to NRHP: September 18, 1989

The house at 42 Vinal Avenue in Somerville, Massachusetts is a well-preserved Shingle style house. It is a 2 1/2-story wood-frame structure, roughly square in shape, with a cross-gable roof. The roof line of the front-facing gable extends downward to the first floor on the right, sheltering a porch on the building's right front. It is stylistically a very pure execution of the Shingle style, with most of the building clad in shingles, except very simple trim elements. It was built about 1895, when the Prospect Hill area was a fashionable residential area with ready access to streetcars providing access to Boston for commuters.

The house was listed on the National Register of Historic Places in 1989.

== See also ==
- House at 49 Vinal Avenue, Somerville, MA
- National Register of Historic Places listings in Somerville, Massachusetts
