= Robert A. Vinal =

American politician

Robert Aldersey Vinal

Member of the Massachusetts House of Representatives for the 3rd Middlesex District
- In office 1865–1865
- Preceded by: Charles Powers
- Succeeded by: Frederick R. Kinsley

Member of the Somerville Massachusetts Board of Selectmen
- In office 1869 – January 2, 1872
- Preceded by: New position
- Succeeded by: Office Abolished

Personal details
- Born: March 6, 1821 Boston, Massachusetts
- Died: April 12, 1887
- Party: Republican
- Spouse: Almira Louise Pierce
- Profession: Merchant

Robert Aldersey Vinal (March 6, 1821 – April 12, 1887) was a Massachusetts businessman and politician who served as a member of the Massachusetts House of Representatives and on the Board of Selectmen of Somerville, Massachusetts.

== Notes ==
Political offices
Preceded by New position	Member of the Somerville, Massachusetts; Board of Selectmen; 1869-January 2, 1872	Succeeded by Office abolished
Preceded by Charles Powers	Member of the Massachusetts House of Representatives; 3rd Middlesex District; January, 1864-January, 1865	Succeeded by Frederick R. Kinsley
