= Bi-Cultural Hebrew Academy of Connecticut =

Coordinates: 41.35122°N 72.99130°W

Location
- 2186 High Ridge Road; Stamford, Connecticut 06902; United States

Information
- Type: Private
- Established: 2010 (16 years ago)
- CEEB code: 070071
- Principal: David Giver
- Grades: K-12
- Enrollment: 53
- Athletics: Basketball and tennis
- Accreditation: New England Association of Schools and Colleges
- Website: www.bcha-ct.org

The Bi-Cultural Hebrew Academy of Connecticut is an independent Jewish K-12 school located in Stamford, Connecticut.

The Jewish High School of Connecticut (JHSC) in Stamford, in the fall of 2018, merged with the Bi-Cultural Day School to become the Upper School for the Bi-Cultural Hebrew Academy of Connecticut.

== History ==
In 2007, the Board of Trustees established the Jewish High School of Connecticut. JHSC opened its doors in the 2010–2011 academic year. The founding Head of School was Rabbi Edward Harwitz. The final Head of School prior to the merger was Rabbi Elisha Paul.

The school originally was located in Bridgeport, Connecticut at Congregation B'nai Israel. It subsequently moved to Woodbridge before moving again to the Cytec Building in Stamford, Connecticut. After merging with Bi-Cultural Day School, the school remained at its site in Stamford before moving onto the Bi-Cultural Hebrew Academy campus in the fall of 2019.

== Athletics ==
JHSC was an affiliate of the Connecticut Constitutional Conference and competed with other high schools in the region. After the merger, the school became a probationary member of the FairChester Athletic Association.

At various times, JHSC offered the following sports: soccer, basketball, track and field, tennis, golf, swimming, and weights and conditioning.
