= German School of Connecticut =

School in the United States

Coordinates: 41.08417°N 73.54662°W

Information
- Established: 1978; 48 years ago
- Enrollment: c.350
- Language: German

The German School of Connecticut, also known as GSC, is a private nonprofit Saturday school founded in 1978 with a student body of 350. A professional teaching staff, most of whom are native German speakers, provide three contact hours on each of thirty Saturdays during the traditional September – May school year. Classes are held on two campuses: Stamford and West Hartford, for ages ranging from preschool to high school as well as adults. Students learn, improve or maintain German language skills while celebrating German, Austrian and Swiss cultures.

In 1982, it was the first German-language school in the United States to be selected by the German Standing Conference of the Ministers of Education and Cultural Affairs and Central Agency for Schools Abroad (Zentralstelle für das Auslandsschulwesen) to administer the official Sprachdiplom I examination, and the following year added the Sprachdiplom II. These annual exams test the equivalence of ten and twelve years of German language study, equalling proficiency on the B1/A2 and C1/B2 levels of the Common European Framework of Reference for Languages, respectively.

The school receives support from the German government, as well as local businesses and donors. In 2009, the school became one of the 66 US partner schools with the German government in the PASCH program. It is a member of the World Association of German Schools Abroad German: Weltverband Deutsche Auslandsschulen and also a founding member of the German Language School Conference.

== High school credits ==
As of July 1, 2008, Connecticut students studying World languages in community schools such as the German School of Connecticut are eligible to receive high school foreign-language credit for their studies.

== Target market ==
Many students and graduates of German School of Connecticut realize the advantage of studying one of Europe's leading languages. Some plan to study in a German-speaking country of Europe, others on splitting their future studies between universities in the US and a German-speaking country. Some study to gain a professional advantage. Certain high school students have the opportunity to take a special German-language exam, the "Sprachdiplom", which fulfills the language requirements for direct entry at a German university. High school students can also prepare for the American Association of the Teacher of German exam, or the Advanced Placement German Language exam, earning one or more US college credits.
