= Ella T. Grasso Technical High School =

Ella T. Grasso Southeastern Technical High School

Location
- 189 Fort Hill Road; Groton, Connecticut 06340; United States
- Coordinates: 41°20′29″N 72°01′01″W

Information
- CEEB code: 070254
- Principal: Daniel Mello (since August 2024)
- Enrollment: 674 (2023-2024)
- Mascot: Eagle
- Website: grasso.cttech.org

Ella T. Grasso Southeastern Technical High School, or Grasso Tech, is a technical high school located in Groton, Connecticut. It is in the Connecticut Technical Education and Career System. It receives students from 24 towns within New London County and nearby Middlesex County, including Stonington, New London, Ledyard, Waterford, Norwich, Lisbon, Griswold, and Westbrook.

The school is named after Ella T. Grasso, the first woman elected governor of Connecticut.

== Technologies ==
In addition to a complete academic program leading to a high school diploma, students attending Grasso Tech receive training in one of the following trades and technologies:

- Automotive Collision Repair and Refinishing
- Automotive Technology
- Bioscience and Environmental Technology
- Culinary Arts
- Digital Media
- Electrical
- Guest Services Management
- Hairdressing and Cosmetology
- Information Systems Technology
- Mechanical Design and Engineering Technology
- Plumbing and Heating
- Welding, Metal Fabrication and Ship-fitting
