= West Haven Board of Education =

School district in Connecticut, United States

West Haven School District

Address
- P.O. Box 26010 West Haven, Connecticut 06516 United States

District information
- Type: Public
- Grades: Pre-K-12
- Superintendent: Neil Cavallaro

West Haven Board of Education, also known as West Haven School District, is the school district of West Haven, Connecticut, United States.

== History ==
Circa 2008 Neil Cavallaro, an alumnus of West Haven High, became the superintendent.

In 2021, members of the community suggested that, because of the COVID-19 aid money the school received, it should increase its paraprofessional wages. Jim Morrissey, a member of the school board, favored the union-negotiated wages but argued that the paraprofessional pay was "paltry".

== Schools ==
High school

- West Haven High School

Middle schools

- Harry M. Bailey Middle School

Intermediate schools

- May V. Carrigan Intermediate School

Elementary schools

- Alma E. Pagels Elementary School
- Edith E. Mackrille Elementary School
- Forest Elementary School
- Savin Rock Community School
- Seth G. Haley Elementary School
- Washington Elementary School
