= Connecticut Technical High School System =

System of high schools in Connecticut, US

Connecticut Technical Education and Career System

Address
- 39 Woodland Street Hartford, Connecticut, 06105; United States
- Coordinates: 41°46′12″N 72°42′07″W

District information
- Type: Vocational/Public-State Run
- Grades: 9–12
- Superintendent: Dr. Alice Pritchard, Executive Director Freeman Burr, Interim Superintendent
- Schools: 20
- NCES District ID: 0900002

Students and staff
- Enrollment: 11,331 (2020-2021)
- Staff: 1,011 (FTE)
- Student–teacher ratio: 11.20

Other information
- Website: www.cttech.org

The state of Connecticut funds and operates the Connecticut Technical Education and Career System (CTECS). It is a statewide system of 17 diploma-granting technical high schools and one technical education center, serving approximately 10,200 full-time high school students with comprehensive education and training in 38 occupational areas. CTECS also serves approximately 5,500 part-time adult students in apprenticeship and other programs. Two full-time adult programs are offered in aviation maintenance.

High school students receive a technical college preparatory curriculum, and earn a Connecticut high school diploma as well as a certificate in a specific trade technology. Approximately 45 percent of graduates go on to college, and approximately 50 percent go on to employment, apprenticeships, or the military following graduation.

Adult students are provided full-time, post-high school programs in aviation mechanics (P&M), apprentice training, and part-time programs for retraining and upgrading skills. Many customized educational programs and services for youth and adults also are provided. These include English for language learners (ELL) programs, tech prep relationships, handicapped and psychological services, and a full complement of remedial programs. Program relevance is ensured through an extensive network of technology advisory committees, authentic assessment, and an aggressive response to the implementation of emerging technologies of the workplace.

== List of Schools in the Connecticut Technical High School System ==
The Connecticut Technical High School System is made up of 17 degree-granting technical high schools, with several satellite campuses and one technical education center:

- Henry Abbott Technical High School
- Bristol Technical Education Center
- Bullard Havens Technical High School
- Howell Cheney Technical High School
- Connecticut Aero Tech Center
- H. H. Ellis Technical High School
- E. C. Goodwin Technical High School
- Ella T. Grasso Southeastern Technical High School
- W.F. Kaynor Technical High School
- Norwich Technical High School
- Emmett O'Brien Technical High School
- Platt Technical High School
- A.I. Prince Technical High School
- Stratford School for Aviation Maintenance Technicians
- Vinal Technical High School
- Eli Whitney Technical High School
- H.C. Wilcox Technical High School
- Windham Technical High School
- Oliver Wolcott Technical High School
- J. M. Wright Technical High School

== See also ==
- Vocational school
- Association for Career and Technical Education
