= Vinyl =

Vinyl may refer to:

== Chemistry ==
- Polyvinyl chloride (PVC), one specific type of vinyl polymer
- Vinyl cation, a type of carbocation
- Vinyl group, a broad class of organic molecules in chemistry
- Vinyl polymer, a group of polymers derived from vinyl monomers

== Film ==
- Vinyl (1965 film), directed by Andy Warhol
- Vinyl (2000 film), a documentary directed by Alan Zweig
- Vinyl (2012 film), directed by Sara Sugarman about a 2004 musical hoax involving UK band, The Alarm

== Materials ==
- PVC clothing, a fabric
- Vinyl composition tile, a type of floor tiling
- Vinyl siding, an exterior building cladding

== Music ==
- Vinyl record, a phonograph record manufactured with polyvinyl chloride
- Vinyl Group, an Australian music technology company
- Vinyl (Dramarama album), 1991
- Vinyl (William Michael Morgan album), 2016
- Vinyl (EP), by Dramarama
- Vinyl Solution, a record label
- "Vinyl", a song by Kira Kosarin

== Software ==
- Vinyl Cache, web accelerator

== Sports ==
- Vinyl BC, a basketball club based in Miami, Florida

== Television ==
- Vinyl (TV series), a 2016 American television series on HBO
- Vinyl Scratch, a background character on My Little Pony: Friendship is Magic
