= Treasury Executive Office for Asset Forfeiture =

The Treasury Executive Office for Asset Forfeiture (TEOAF) is an agency of the United States federal government in the United States Department of the Treasury. TEOAF is responsible for administering the Treasury Forfeiture Fund (TFF). The TFF was established in 1992 as the successor to what was then the Customs Forfeiture Fund. It is authorized by section 9703 of Title 31 of the U.S. Code (note that there are erroneously two section 9703's, each dealing with a different subject matter). It is the receipt account for the deposit of non-tax forfeitures made by the following member agencies:

- Internal Revenue Service Criminal Investigation Division
- Immigration and Customs Enforcement
- Customs and Border Protection
- United States Department of Homeland Security
- Secret Service
- United States Coast Guard
