= Rites of Passage (educational program) =

African American program in Stamford, Connecticut

Rites of Passage logo

Rites of Passage is an African American History program sponsored by the Stamford, Connecticut US public schools. The program consists of an extra day of schooling on Saturday for 12 weeks, service projects, and a culminating educational trip to Gambia and Senegal, the ancestral homes of many African Americans. The highlight of the trip is a visit to Goree Island, and the Door of No Return. The Door of No Return symbolizes the last point of departure of African slaves being shipped to the Western Hemisphere. As Rodney Bass, the founder and director of the program describes it:

By passing through "The Door of No Return" the students invalidate the legacy of slavery and reconnect with the ancestral heritage, linking their past to their present. We have seen the positive changes in the educational performance of our alumni students, and also the greater impact they have had on our community and the possibilities for their future.

The program is open to 7th grade students. Students must apply and be accepted. Typical participation is 10 to 20 students.

The program was founded by Rodney Bass, a former principal in the Stamford school system. He was moved by his own first visit to West Africa. He and the other teachers who lead the program:

hypothesized that we can help produce healthier young people who now understand slavery was not their beginning, nor the principal means of defining the African-American experience, but instead a real, limited part of a legacy of faith, pride, and endurance that spans millennia.

The program is open to students of all races and heritages. 2010 marked its fifth anniversary.

== See also ==
East Side House Settlement (Bronx, NY) a Bronx NY based after school program which teaches African American history.
