= Vinal Technical High School =

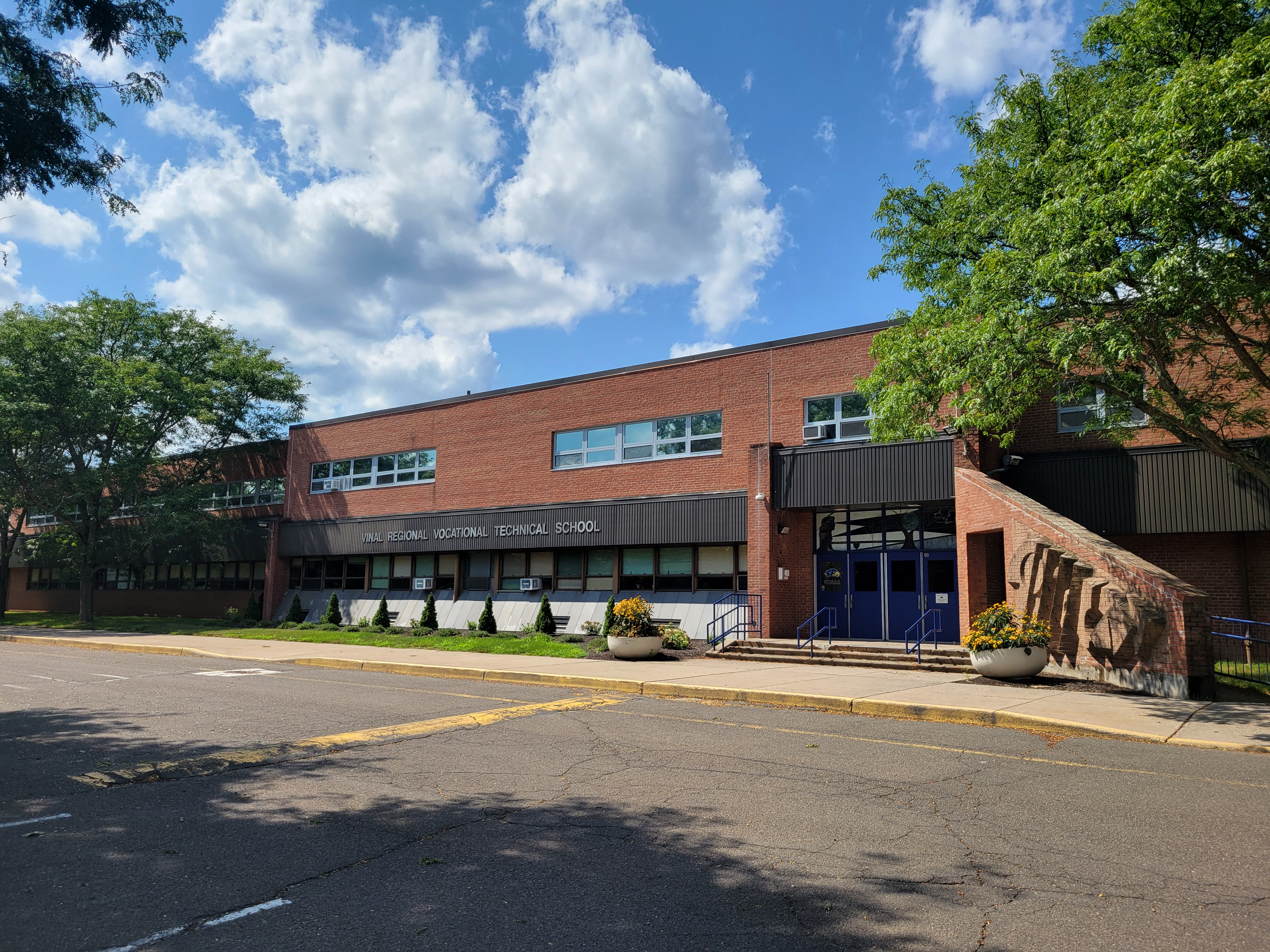

Location
- 60 Daniels Street; Middletown, Connecticut 06457; United States
- Coordinates: 41°31′41″N 72°40′26″W

Information
- CEEB code: 070405
- Principal: Nelson Rivera
- Grades: 9-12
- Enrollment: 547 (2023-2024)
- Mascot: Hawk
- Website: vinal.cttech.org

Vinal Technical High School, or Vinal Tech, is a technical high school located in Middletown, Connecticut. It is in the Connecticut Technical Education and Career System. It receives students from many nearby towns. Vinal Tech currently has around 600 students from approximately 27 different towns.

== Technologies ==
In addition to a complete academic program leading to a high school diploma, students attending Vinal Tech receive training in one of the following trades and technologies:

- Automotive Technology
- Carpentry
- Criminal Justice and Protective Services
- Diesel and Heavy-Duty Equipment Repair
- Electrical
- Hairdressing and Cosmetology
- Heating, Ventilation and Air Conditioning (HVAC)
- Information System Technology
- Precision Machining Technology
- Veterinary Science

== Sports ==
Vinal Tech has a variety of sports available for students to participate in. The school colors of Vinal Tech are blue, yellow, and white.

- Baseball
- Basketball
- Cross country
- Football
- Golf
- Outdoor track
- Rifle team
- Soccer
- Softball
- Volleyball
- Wrestling
