= Connecticut State Department of Education =

State agency of Connecticut, U.S.

- Headquarters in Hartford, CT

State agency overview
- Jurisdiction: Connecticut
- Headquarters: 450 Columbus Boulevard Hartford, CT 06103
- State agency executive: Charlene M. Russell-Tucker, Commissioner
- Website: portal.ct.gov/sde

The Connecticut State Department of Education is a branch of the state government of Connecticut in the United States. The agency is headquartered at 450 Columbus Boulevard in Hartford. The department, under the supervision of the Connecticut State Board of Education, oversees public education in the state, distribute funds to the state's 166 school districts, and operates the Connecticut Technical High School System.
