= A. I. Prince Technical High School =

Coordinates: 41.7431°N 72.7079°W

A.I. Prince Technical High School

Location
- 401 Flatbush Avenue; Hartford, Connecticut 06106; United States

Information
- Founded: 1960 (66 years ago)
- CEEB code: 070270
- Principal: Charles Shooshan
- Teaching staff: 73.60 (FTE)
- Grades: 9-12
- Enrollment: 718 (2024-2025)
- Student to teacher ratio: 10.29
- Colors: Purple, yellow, and white
- Mascot: Falcon
- Website: https://prince.cttech.org/

A.I. Prince Technical High School, or Prince Tech, is a technical high school located in Hartford, Connecticut. Prince Tech receives students from many nearby towns. Prince Tech prepares students for both college and careers through the achievement of 21st-century skills. Prince Tech is a part of the Connecticut Technical Education and Career System.

== History ==
The Hartford Trade School was founded in 1915. The school was renamed Albert I. Prince when it was moved from 110 Washington Street to 400 Brookfield Street in October 1960. Mr. Prince was the managing editor of The Hartford Times newspaper and served as the Chairman of the State Board of Education for 12 years.

== Technologies ==
In addition to a complete academic program leading to a high school diploma, students attending Prince Tech receive training in one of the following trades and technologies:

- Aerospace Component Manufacturing Technology
- Automotive Collision Repair and Refinishing
- Automotive Technology
- Carpentry
- Criminal Justice and Protective Services
- Culinary Arts
- Digital Media
- Electrical
- Graphics Technology
- Hairdressing and Cosmetology
- Health Technologies
- Information Systems Technology
- Masonry
- Plumbing and Heating
