= J. M. Wright Technical High School =

High school in Connecticut, United States

Coordinates: 41°03′42″N 73°32′50″W

J.M. Wright Technical High School, or Wright Tech, is a technical high school located in Stamford, Connecticut, United States. It is part of the Connecticut Technical High School System.

Having suspended operations in 2009 due to budgetary restrictions, Wright Tech reopened its doors in 2014 to 144 first-year students after undergoing an $85 million renovation. During the groundbreaking ceremony, Connecticut Technical High School System Superintendent, Dr. Nivea L. Torres, referred to Wright Tech as the "flagship for the district." By 2017, the school expects to be at capacity with nearly 600 students.

Prior to closing, the school offered training in seven trades. For the class of 2007, the most popular were automotive, electrical, and hairdressing. In 2014, Wright Tech offered nine rigorous trade programs to students, including the system's first facilities management program, which has since become the most advanced program of its kind in the nation.

Students come from Stamford, Norwalk, Easton, Fairfield, Weston, Wilton, Westport, New Canaan, Greenwich, and Bridgeport. In recent years, more students have been coming from the immediate Stamford area. In the class of 2008, 38 percent of students were from local school districts and 62 percent from Bridgeport. However, in the class of 2011, 82 percent of students were from Stamford.

Trailblazers Academy, a charter school with 150 students in grades 6 through 8 and run by the nonprofit Domus Foundation of Stamford, was housed in the Wright Tech building starting 2000, though it has since moved to downtown Stamford. Many Trailblazers students are those who have struggled in traditional schools. As of the 2006–2007 school year, about 98 percent of the students were from Stamford.

== Struggles to improve the school ==
Sid Abramowitz, principal since 2005, announced in March 2008 that he would step down at the end of his third school year.

Under Abramowitz' administration, school uniforms became a requirement and a system was established to hold teachers accountable for student lateness and other behavioral problems. In 2007, 66 percent of the school's sophomores met the reading proficiency standard of the Connecticut Academic Performance Test (CAPT), up from 32 percent in 2006. Entrance requirements also became more stringent.

A $41 million plan to renovate the school, including upgrading classrooms and improving technology, was postponed in 2007 because, state officials said, vocational schools in Groton and Norwich were found to be in more urgent need of the money. The renovation plans included upgrading all classrooms, installing air conditioning, and providing new technology for the culinary arts, auto repair and other programs. An expanded library and a new two-story atrium at the front entrance are also a part of the plan.

=== Proposal to change to a two-year training center ===
In November 2007, the state Board of Education was ready to transform the high school into a training center (or "career academy") where students would transfer as juniors or seniors for a year or two of training and receive their diplomas from their hometown high schools. The Bristol Technical Education Center is the only technical school in the state to follow that model, and state education officials pointed to increased enrollment at that school while enrollment is down at Wright Tech. High school graduates also attend the school for training, although most students there are still in high school. A decision was postponed for a year after an outcry from backers of Wright Tech, including some state legislators, local business people, alumni, and Lt. Gov. Michael Fedele of Stamford. Some said they feared the change would be disastrous for the school because few teenagers would want to change from taking classes at high school to taking them at Wright Tech starting in the 11th grade.

Wright Tech is expected to reopen as a traditional four-year technical high school, offering eight trades.

== Closure and reopening ==
Operations of the school were suspended in 2009 due to budgetary restrictions compounded by dismal enrollment and achievement figures. However, local and state lobbying efforts led a discussion to reopen the school. "We fought successfully to reopen Wright Tech and we continue to fight for increased funding to ensure its success," said state Sen. Carlo Leone, D-27. Wright Tech reopened for the fall of 2014 following renovations and selection of new staff, new curricula, and new students, such that it effectively was brand new school.

The school reopened for ninth graders in 2014, and added one new class each year until it included grades 9 through 12 in 2018. Trades related to automotive, health, culinary arts and science technologies offer the most popular programs chosen by incoming students. Along with new programs, Wright Tech was to receive nearly $5 million in additional state funding from 2015 through 2016, which was expected to boost enrollment by over 300 students and fund twenty one new full-time positions and five new part-time positions.

Wright Tech has also created partnerships with Connecticut-based companies, which help support the learning process. Partners include WTNH Channel 8 for the school's digital media program and Stamford Hospital for its health technology trades. The goal of these partnerships is to provide students with mentoring, internships, curriculum development and some of the latest technology needed for their chosen fields.

Leading the resurgence of Wright Tech is new principal Eric Hilversum. He replaced former principal Joseph Tripodi, who was instrumental in guiding the school through its restart year. “We are very pleased to have Mr. Hilversum lead Wright Technical High School,” Dr. Nivea L. Torres, superintendent of schools, Connecticut Technical High School System. “His educational background and experience coincide with exactly what we envision for guiding our students and leading them through these critical academic years.”
