= Norwich Technical High School =

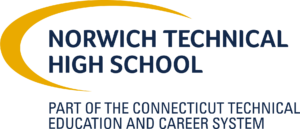

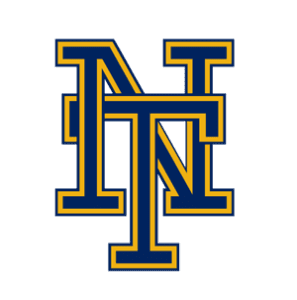

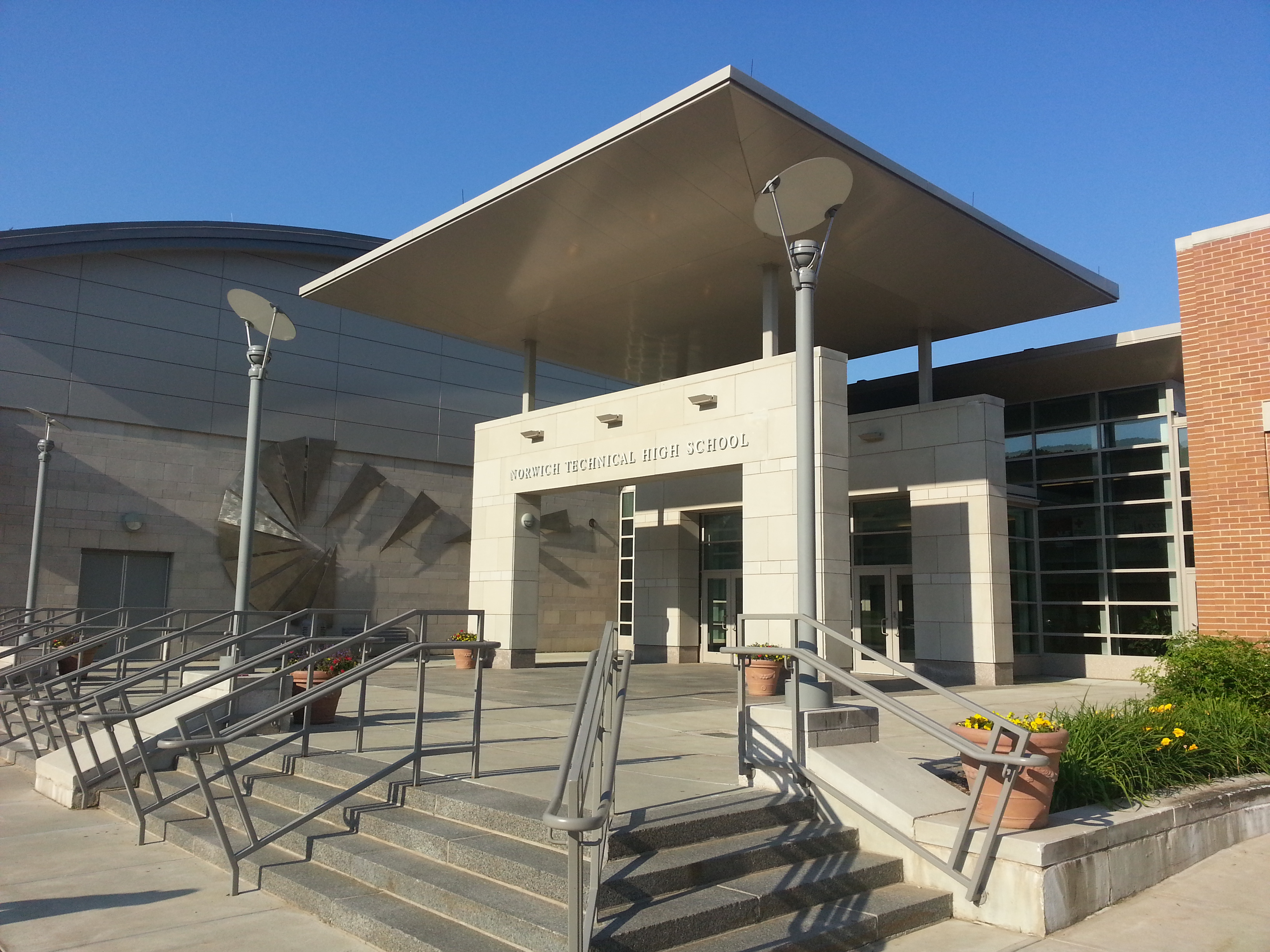
- Norwich Tech Entrance, 2013

Location
- 7 Mahan Drive; Norwich, Connecticut 06360; United States
- Coordinates: 41°32′56″N 72°04′41″W

Information
- Opened: 1954 (72 years ago)
- CEEB code: 070595
- Principal: Donald Concascia
- Grades: 9-12
- Enrollment: 642 (2023-2024)
- Mascot: Warriors
- Website: norwich.cttech.org

Norwich Technical High School, or Norwich Tech, is a public technical high school located in Norwich, Connecticut. It is one of the Connecticut Technical Education and Career System schools located within the state, and receives students from nearby cities and towns including Canterbury, Groton, New London, Norwich, Old Saybrook, Waterford, Montville , Willimantic and many more within Southeastern Connecticut.

Norwich Tech offers a 72-seat restaurant which is open to the public and operated by the culinary arts students. In addition, Norwich Tech features an automotive garage in which automotive tech students work on vehicles, which is also open to the public for simple/moderate automotive repairs and maintenance.

== History ==
Norwich Technical High School (originally founded as Norwich Regional Vocational Technical School) was founded in 1954 with its original campus located at 590 New London Turnpike, a facility that was later renovated and expanded to a size of 88,442 square feet. Norwich Tech operated at this location, adjacent to Three Rivers Technical College, for over 50 years, accommodating roughly 500 students each year.

Prior to 2009, Norwich Tech made arrangements to swap locations with the former Mohegan Community College campus, now part of Three Rivers Community College, located at 7 Mahan Drive. Under this arrangement, sections of Three Rivers/Mohegan' old campus - over 99,000 square feet - would be renovated, and an additional 94,000 square feet would be constructed to accommodate a brand new cafeteria, gym, library and fitness room - in addition to lab space, classrooms, trade shop spaces and the renovated auditorium. The new location at 7 Mahan Drive was completed in 2009, and existing students relocated after finishing their first semester of the year to the campus. This new campus includes modern equipment, computers and classroom configurations, as well as climate controlled rooms, ambient lighting and larger workshops.

== Technologies ==
In addition to a complete academic program leading to a high school diploma, students attending Norwich Tech receive training in one of the following trades and technologies:

- Plumbing and Heating
- Health Technology
- Heating, Ventilation, and Air Conditioning
- Hairdressing and Cosmetology
- Graphic Design
- Electronics Technology
- Electrical
- Culinary Arts
- Carpentry
- Business Management and Administration
- Biotechnology
- Automotive Technology
