= Academy of Information Technology and Engineering =

High school in Stamford, Connecticut, United States

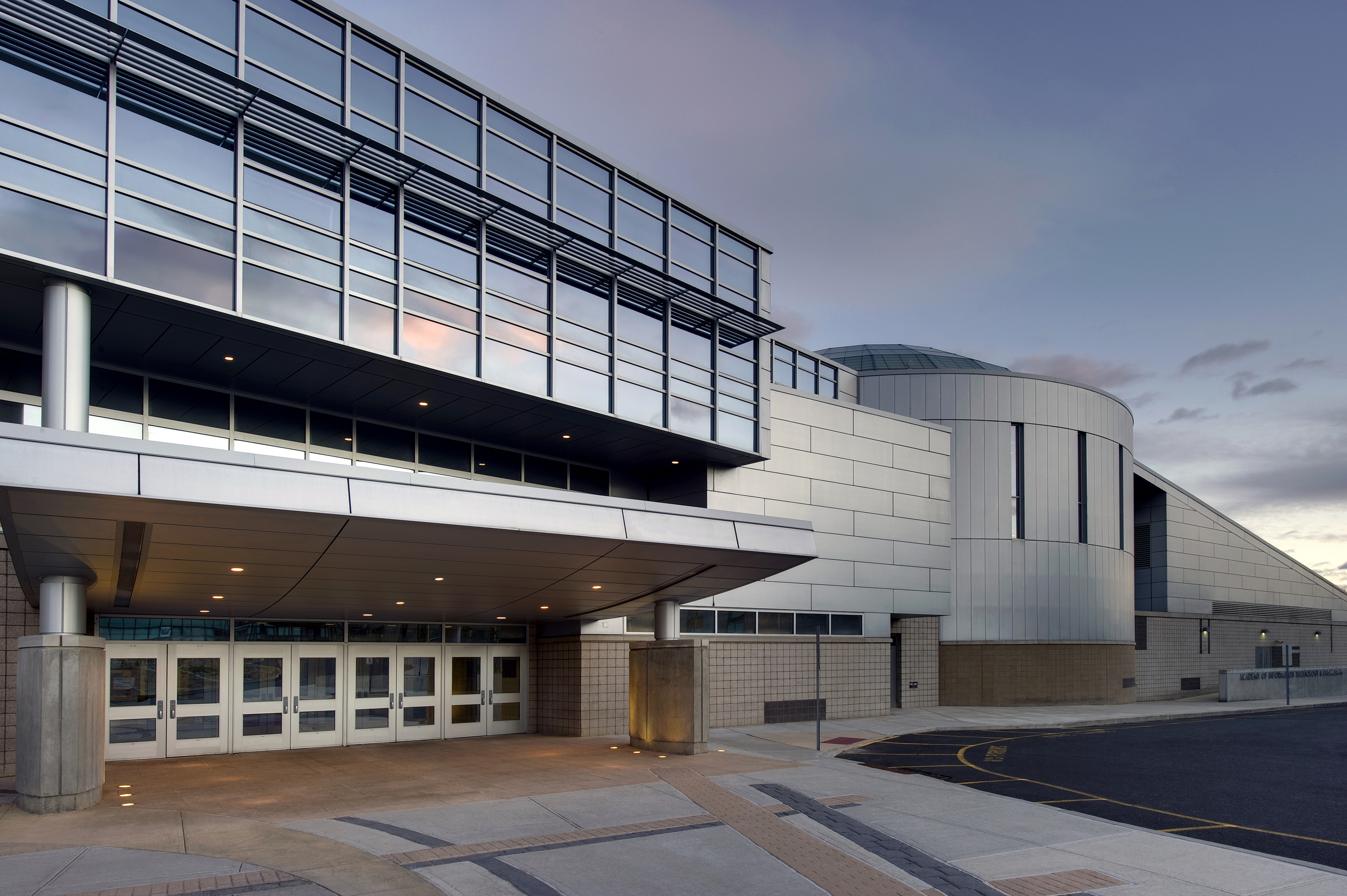

Location
- 411 High Ridge Road; Stamford, Connecticut 06905; United States
- 41°05′09″N 73°32′56″W

Information
- Type: Technology and engineering, inter district, public, magnet school, high school
- Motto: Going Forward
- Established: 1999 (27 years ago)
- School district: Stamford Public Schools
- CEEB code: 070707
- Principal: Tina Rivera
- Staff: 32
- Faculty: 57
- Grades: 9-12
- Enrollment: 638 (2018-19)
- Campus type: Single building
- Colors: Gold and black
- Athletics: Student athletes play for their district school; where they would normally go if they didn't attend AITE (e.g. Stamford High, Westhill, etc.)
- Mascot: Cyber Ram
- Communities served: Ridgefield, Stamford, Wilton, Bridgeport, Redding, Greenwich, Norwalk, Darien, Weston, New Cannan
- Website: www.aitestamford.org

The Academy of Information Technology and Engineering (AITE) is a college preparatory, inter-district public magnet high school originally founded in Stamford, Connecticut. AITE serves the Connecticut communities of Stamford, Darien, Greenwich, Norwalk, New Canaan, Redding, Ridgefield, Wilton and Weston.

== See also ==
- Stamford, Connecticut
- Education in Stamford, Connecticut
