= Gallows Hill =

Gallows Hill may refer to:

== Place names ==
British Isles

- Gallows Hill SSSI, Wiltshire, England, a Site of Special Scientific Interest in Wiltshire
- Gallows Hill, Lower Brailes, Warwickshire, England, on the B4035
- Gallows Hill, Cratloe, County Clare, named for execution of rebels by Cromwellian forces here circa 1650
- Gallows Hill, Lancaster, Lancashire, England, place where Pendle witches were hanged
- Gallows Hill, Otley, site of the gallows, now a nature reserve
- Gallows Hill, Ripon, North Yorkshire, England, place where 300 were hanged, 1570
- Gallow Hill Tain, Ross-shire, The last hanging took place in 1762 when, Katherine Ross, a young mother, was hanged for the murder of her child. In more recent times it was surmounted by a flagstaff but that has now disappeared. Today it is still occasionally used for rolling Easter Eggs and, when weather conditions permit, for sledging.
- Gallow Hill, a hill in Scotland

United States

- Gallows Hill, Pennsylvania, an unincorporated community in Pennsylvania
- Gallows Hill, Salem, Massachusetts, place where Bridget Bishop was hanged in 1692 as part of the Salem witch trials
- Gallows Hill, Tappan, New York, place where Major John André was hanged
- Gallows Hill, Cortlandt Manor, New York, place where General Israel Putnam hanged British spy Edmund Palmer in 1777

Australia

- Gallows Hill, in The Rocks, Sydney, suburb

== Other uses ==
- Gallows Hill (novel), a 1997 supernatural thriller novel for young adults by Lois Duncan
- Gallows Hill (film), a 2013 American horror film directed by Víctor Garcia

== See also ==
- Galgenberg (disambiguation), the corresponding German name
- Gibbet Hill (disambiguation), a similar name
