= Galgenberg =

Galgenberg is a German name corresponding to the English "Gallows Hill". Galgenberg may refer to:

- Galgenberg (Elbingerode), a hill near Elbingerode in the Harz Mountains of central Germany
- Galgenberg (Heilbronn), a mountain of Baden-Württemberg, Germany
- Galgenberg (Lütte), a hill in Bad Belzig, Brandenburg, Germany
- Galgenberg (Schwarzenberg), a mountain of Saxony, southeastern Germany
- Galgenberg Formation, a fossiliferous geologic formation in Germany
- Ouvrage Galgenberg, a portion of the Fortified Sector of Thionville of the Maginot Line

== See also ==
- Gallows Hill (disambiguation)
- Venus of Galgenberg, a prehistoric figurine discovered in 1988 near Stratzing, Austria
