= Israel Putnam =

American military officer and landowner (1718–1790)

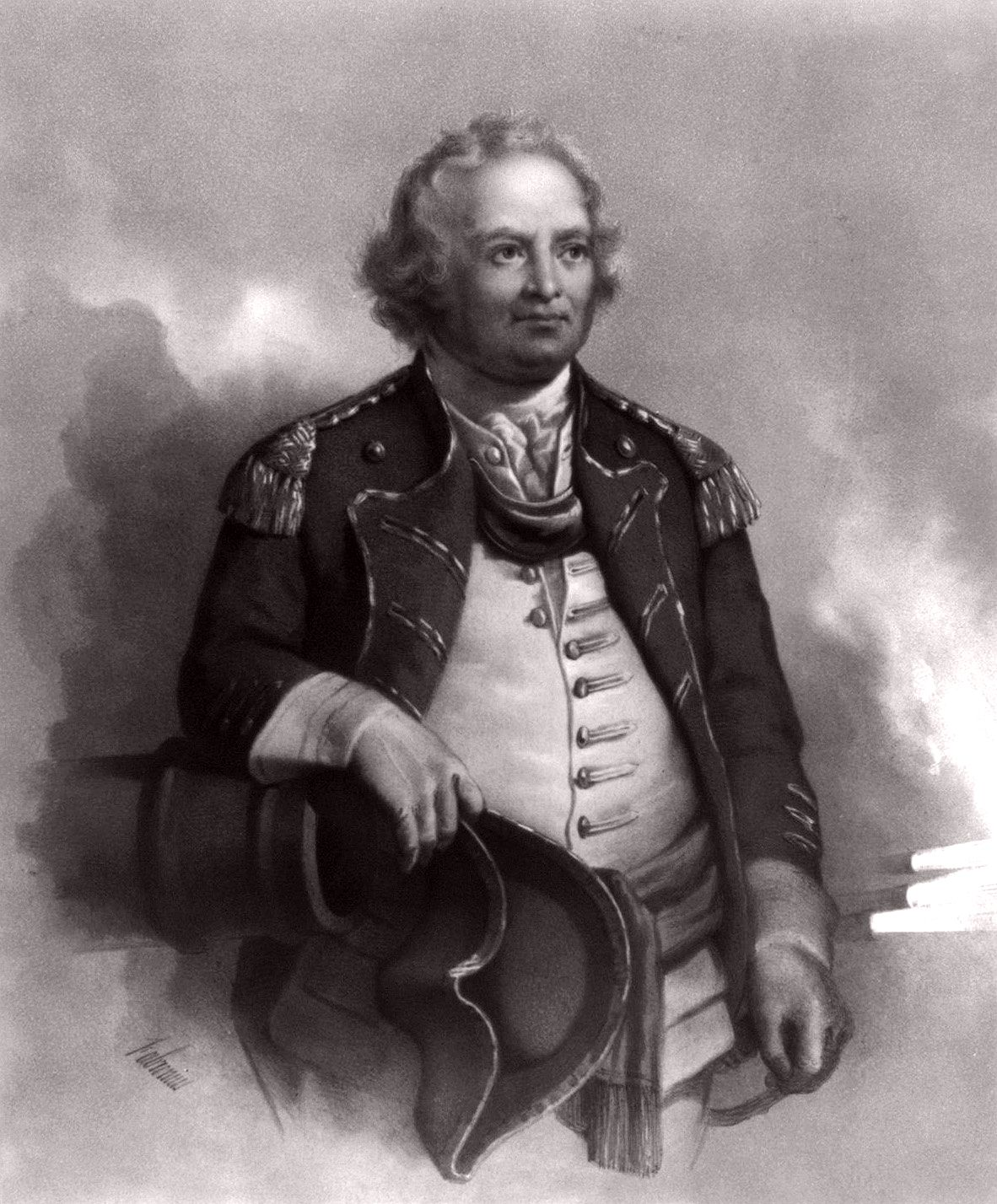
- 1864 portrait
- Born: January 7, 1718; Danvers, Province of Massachusetts Bay, British America
- Died: May 29, 1790 (aged 72); Brooklyn, Connecticut, U.S.
- Burial place: Israel Putnam Monument, Brooklyn, Connecticut, U.S. 41°47′11″N 71°56′59″W
- Spouse(s): Hannah Pope (m. 1739; died 1765) Deborah Lothrop (m. 1767)
- Military career
- Allegiance: Connecticut; United States
- Branch: Connecticut Militia; Continental Army
- Service years: 1755–1776?, 1775-1779
- Rank: Major (Connecticut); Major general (U.S.)
- Nickname: "Old Put"
- Conflicts: French and Indian War; Battle of Ticonderoga; Montreal campaign; Siege of Havana; Pontiac's War; Siege of Fort Detroit; American Revolutionary War; Siege of Boston; Battle of Bunker Hill; Battle of Long Island; Battle of Forts Clinton and Montgomery

Israel Putnam (January 7, 1718 – May 29, 1790), popularly known as "Old Put", was an American military officer and landowner who served in the French and Indian War and American Revolutionary War. He was an officer in Rogers' Rangers during the French and Indian War, during which Putnam was captured by Mohawk warriors. He was saved from the ritual burning given to enemies by the intervention of French captain named Molang, with whom the Mohawks were allied. Putnam's exploits became known far beyond his home of Connecticut's borders through the circulation of folk legends in the American colonies and states celebrating his exploits.

== Early life ==
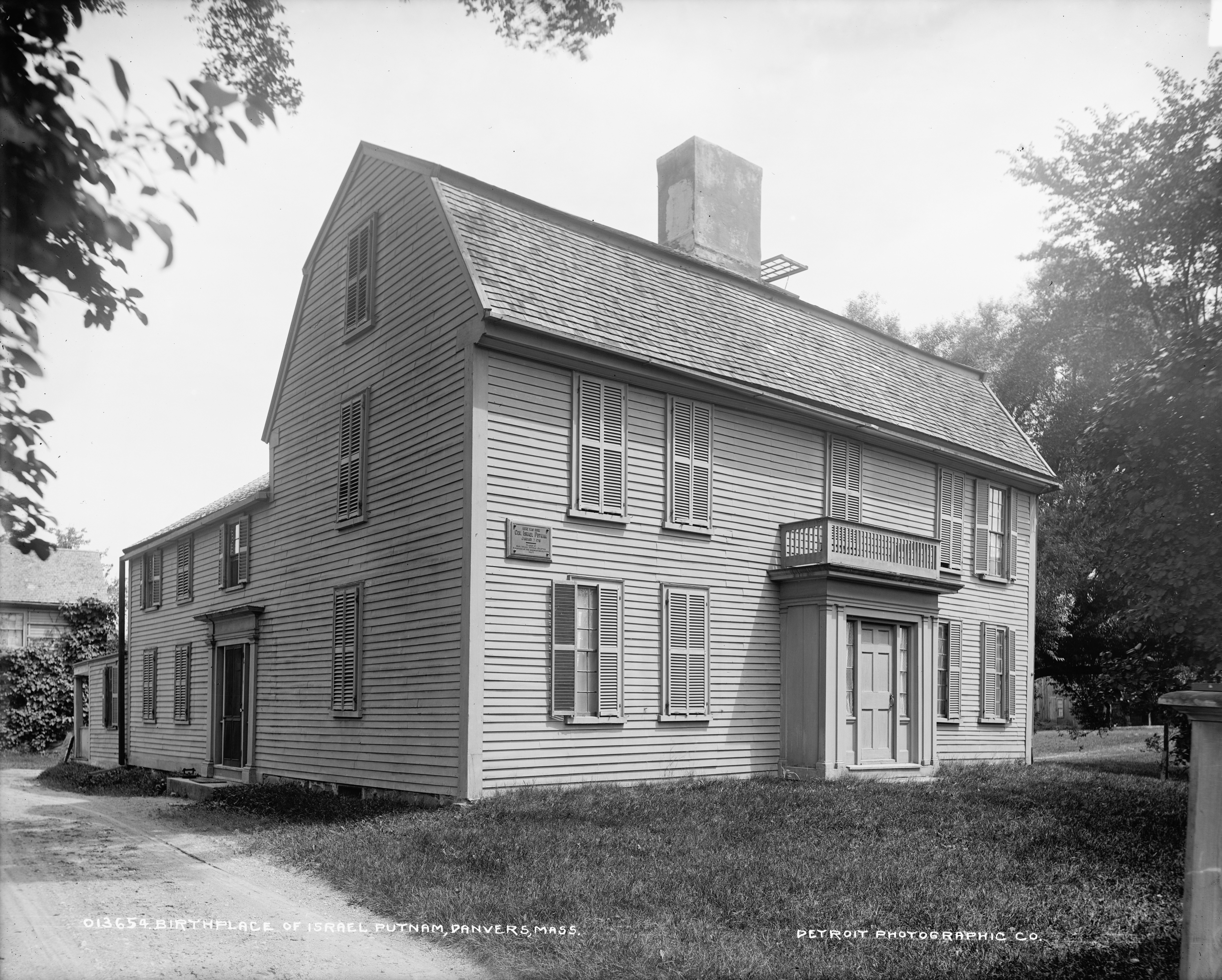
Israel Putnam's birthplace, Danvers, Massachusetts; the house still stands and is owned by the Danvers Historical Society.

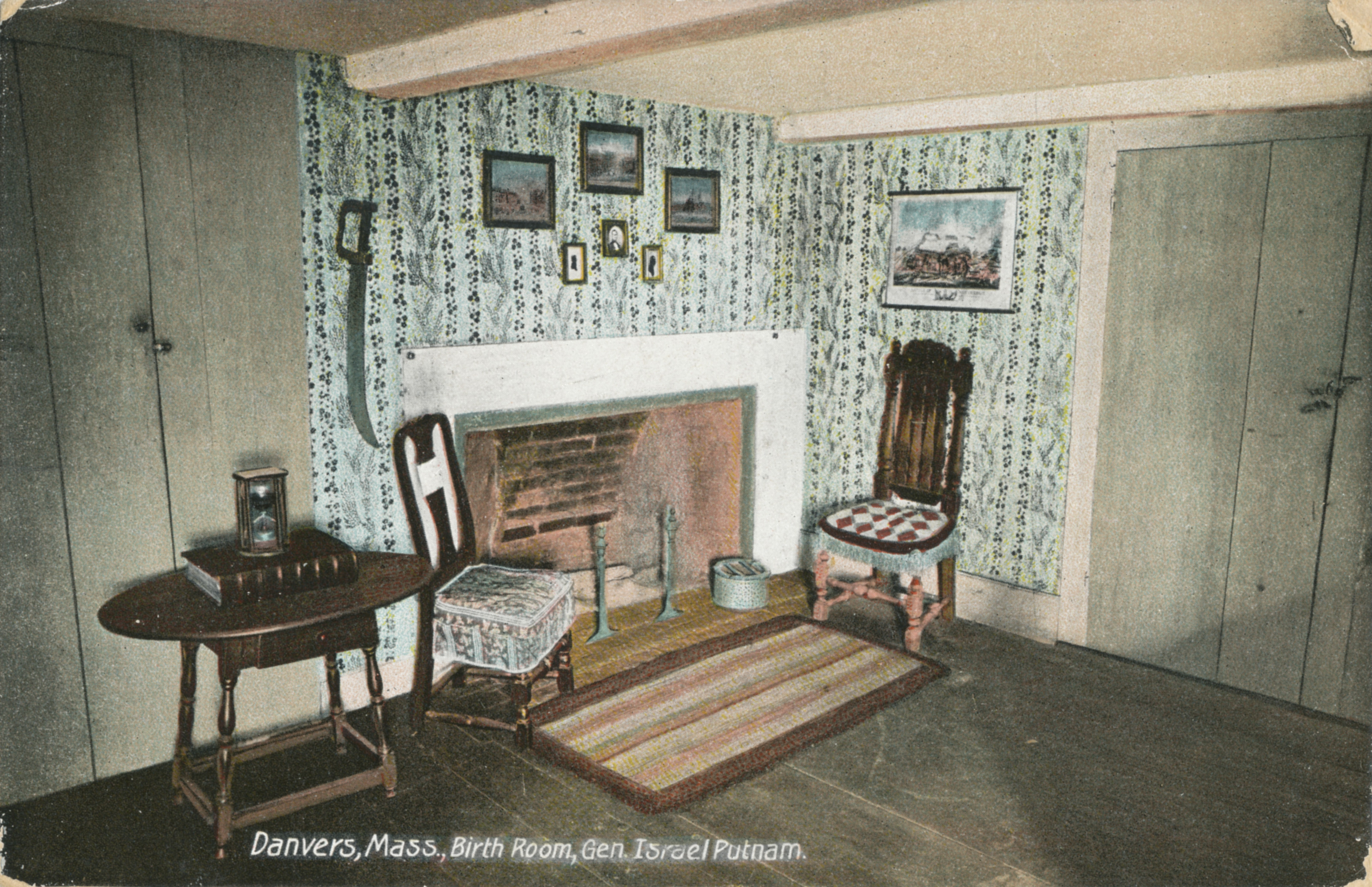
Birth room of General Putnam in Danvers, Massachusetts

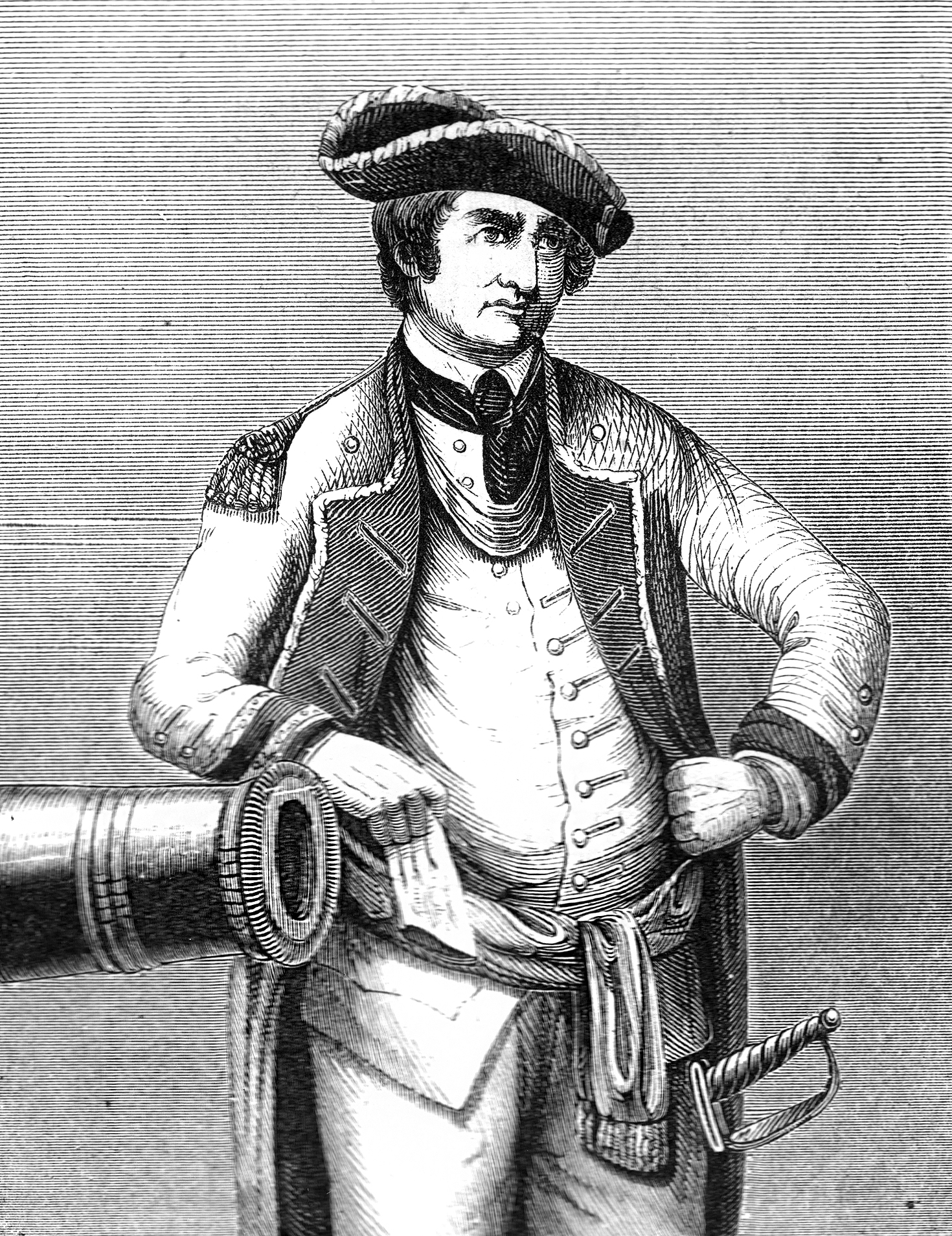
Major Israel Putnam in colonial uniform, 1758

Putnam was born in 1718 in Salem Village, Massachusetts (now Danvers) to Joseph and Elizabeth (Porter) Putnam, a prosperous farming Putnam family. His parents had opposed the Salem witch trials in the 1690s.

Putnam moved west in 1740 at age 22 to Mortlake, Connecticut (today Brooklyn) where land was cheaper. While living in Connecticut, Putnam purchased several Black slaves to work on his lands. He killed a wolf in 1743 with the help of a group of farmers from Mortlake seeking to safeguard their sheep. They tracked the wolf to its den and tried sending in their dogs, but all the dogs returned frightened or injured by the wolf. They tried smoking out the wolf and burning sulfur at the mouth of the cave, all to no avail. After Putnam arrived, he tried getting his dog to enter the den, with no luck. He also tried to get his servant to enter with a torch and gun to shoot the wolf. His servant refused, as did all the other farmers. Putnam then reportedly crawled into the den with a torch, a musket loaded with buckshot, and his feet secured with rope to be quickly pulled out. While in the den, he killed the wolf.

In celebration of the event, Putnam was carried in a torch-lit procession through Pomfret in a celebration that lasted until about midnight. He earned the nicknames "Wolf Putnam" and "Old Wolf Put", which stayed with him for decades afterward. A section of Mashamoquet Brook State Park in Pomfret is named "Israel Putnam Wolf Den" where the den was located. The name "Wolf Den Road" in adjacent Brooklyn also attests to the days of wolves.

Putnam married Hannah Pope in 1739, the mother of his children. She died in 1765, and he married Deborah Lothrop two years later.

== Early military service ==
Putnam was one of the first men in Connecticut in 1755 to sign up to serve as a private in the militia in the French and Indian War at age 37. Over the course of the war, he was promoted to second lieutenant, captain, major, lieutenant colonel, and colonel. He served with Robert Rogers, who gained fame as the commander of Rogers' Rangers, and the two of them had various exploits together, in one of which Putnam saved Rogers' life. Putnam's reputation for courage was made famous by his participation in the war. It was said that "Rogers always sent, but Putnam led his men to action."

In 1757, the Rangers were stationed on an island off Fort Edward. The following February, Putnam and his Rangers were still on Roger's Island when fire broke out in the row of barracks nearest the magazine. The danger of an explosion was imminent, but Putnam took a position on the roof and poured bucket after bucket of water upon the flames, only descending when the buildings fell only a few feet from the magazine. In spite of his severe wounds, he continued to fight the fire, dashing water upon the magazine until the fire was under control. He was laid up for a month due to burns and exposure.

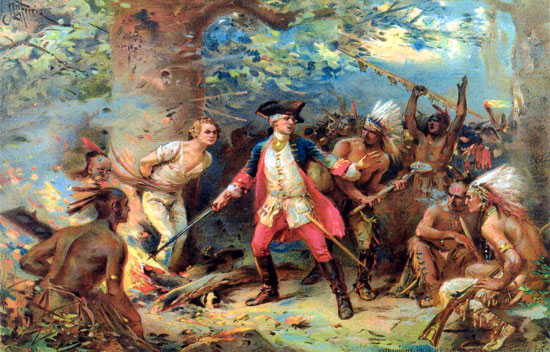
Molang saving Putnam near Glens Falls, 1758

Putnam was captured on August 8, 1758, by Kahnawake Indians from a mission settlement south of Montreal during a military campaign near Crown Point in New York. He was saved from being ritually burned alive by a rainstorm and the last-minute intervention of a French captain named Molang.

In 1759, Putnam led a regiment into The Valley of Death in the attack on Fort Carillon and he was with the British army that marched on Montreal in 1760. In 1762, he survived a shipwreck during the British expedition against Cuba that led to the capture of Havana. Putnam is believed to have brought back Cuban tobacco seeds to New England, which he planted in the Hartford area. This reportedly resulted in the development of the renowned Connecticut Wrapper. In 1763, during Pontiac's Rebellion, Putnam was sent with reinforcements to relieve Chief Pontiac's siege of Fort Detroit.

After the war, he returned to his homestead, a remnant of which exists today as Putnam Farm in Brooklyn, Connecticut. Putnam publicly professed his Christian faith following the Seven Years' War in 1765 and joined the Congregational Church in his town. He was among those who objected to British tax action policies. Around the time of the Stamp Act crisis in 1766, he was elected to the Connecticut General Assembly and was one of the founders of the state's chapter of the Sons of Liberty. In the fall of 1765, he threatened Governor Thomas Fitch over this issue. He said that Fitch's house "will be leveled with the dust in five minutes" if Fitch did not turn over the stamp tax paper to the Sons of Liberty.

== American Revolutionary War ==
=== Battle of Bunker Hill ===
By the eve of the American Revolution, Putnam had become a relatively prosperous farmer and tavern keeper, with more than a local reputation for his previous exploits. He received news of the Battles of Lexington and Concord in April 1775 while he was plowing one of his fields with his son. He literally "came off the plow", leaving it in the field and riding 100 miles (160 km) in eight hours, reaching Cambridge the next day to offer his services to the Patriot cause. He was made a major general, putting him second in rank to General Artemas Ward in the Army of Observation which preceded the founding of the Continental Army.

Putnam was one of the primary figures at the Battle of Bunker Hill in June 1775, both in its planning and on the battlefield. During the battle, he may have ordered William Prescott to tell his troops, "Don't fire until you see the whites of their eyes." It is debated who said these words first; they are attributed to a number of officers. This command has since become one of the American Revolution's notable quotations. It was given to make the best use of the low ammunition stocks that the troops had.

In the planning for the Battle of Bunker Hill, Putnam was likely the one who argued in favor of also fortifying the adjacent hill, which later became known as "Breed's Hill". This hill was closer to Boston so that cannons could fire on the British forces in town, forcing them to come out and attack the hill. The British suffered heavy casualties as they marched toward the American fortifications. However, the Americans ran out of powder and were eventually forced to retreat. American casualties were 449, while British casualties were 1,054. By the standard of the day the Americans lost, since they gave up the ground. However, Continental Army Brigadier General Nathanael Greene wrote to his brother that "I wish we could sell them another hill, at the same price."

Years after the battle, and after Putnam's death, he was accused by Henry Dearborn of failing to supply reinforcements and even of cowardice during the battle. The accusations created a long-standing controversy among veterans, family, friends, and historians. People were shocked by the rancor of the attack, and this prompted a forceful response from defenders of Putnam, including such notables as John and Abigail Adams. Historian Harold Murdock wrote that Dearborn's account "abounds in absurd misstatements and amazing flights of imagination." The Dearborn attack received considerable attention because at the time he was in the middle of controversy himself. He had been relieved of one of the top commands in the War of 1812 due to his mistakes. He had also been nominated to serve as U.S. Secretary of War by President James Monroe, but was rejected by the United States Senate (which was the first time that the Senate had voted against confirming a presidential cabinet choice).

=== Long Island and later service ===
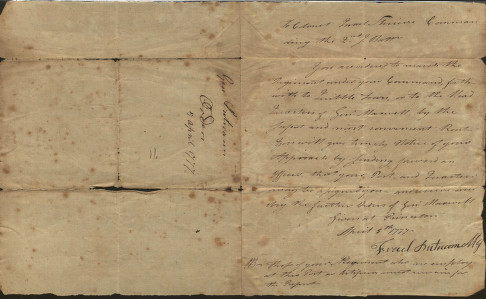
Letter from Israel Putnam to Israel Shreve, 1777

The Continental Congress voted to create the Continental Army on June 14, 1775. They appointed George Washington as Commander-in-Chief, with Putnam and three others appointed as major generals under him. Only the votes for Washington and Putnam were unanimous.

After Bunker Hill, Washington arrived and Putnam served under him in the Siege of Boston. The British were forced to abandon Boston due largely to the efforts of Henry Knox and Putnam's cousin Rufus Putnam in moving 60 tons of artillery from Fort Ticonderoga over 300 miles of snow-covered terrain to Boston. Those cannon, placed on Dorchester Heights, forced the British to sail out of Boston.

Putnam subsequently served as temporary commander of the American forces in New York while waiting for Washington's arrival there on April 13, 1776. Putnam's fortunes declined at the Battle of Long Island in August 1776, where he was forced to effect a hasty retreat from the British. Some in the Second Continental Congress blamed him for the defeat, but Washington witnessed the battle and did not lay blame on him.

It is possible that Putnam's efforts saved Washington's life or prevented his capture. As Senator Daniel Patrick Moynihan described it, "it could be argued that we owe our national existence to the fortifications which General Israel Putnam threw up in April 1776 on the Buttermilk Channel side [of Governors Island, New York." British troops landed on Long Island and headed for Washington and his army. He had to flee, and he made it because Putnam's artillery firing on Brooklyn Heights held Howe back just long enough for Washington to escape to Manhattan.

Putnam was fooled in October 1777 by a feint executed by British troops under the command of General Henry Clinton, making way for Clinton's capture of Fort Montgomery and Fort Clinton. As was standard procedure, Putnam was relieved of command and brought before a court of inquiry for these losses. The court determined that the loss was the result of a lack of men, not of the fault of any commander, and he was exonerated of any wrongdoing.

Putnam had personal friendships and deep respect for several British officers who he had served together with during the French and Indian War, many of whom were now his enemies. While in command in New York, there were several occasions on which he showed personal courtesies, such as providing newspapers to read or medical attention to British officers who had become American prisoners of war. This offended many New Yorkers. He also showed an "unconquerable aversion" to many of those who were entrusted with the disposal of Loyalist-owned property confiscated by American authorities; Putnam felt that they were instead embezzling the funds. This also led to Putnam becoming unpopular with many influential New Yorkers, who complained to Washington.

Washington had also lost some of his faith in Putnam due to an incident in which Putnam delayed in forwarding troops to Washington when ordered to do so. Washington felt that he could not have Putnam in charge of troops in New York without the support of that state, and transferred him to recruiting duties in Connecticut after the court of inquiry finished its investigation. Putnam was later put in command of the Eastern Division, consisting of three brigades of New Hampshire and Connecticut troops. In 1779, he was put in command of the right wing of the army, which included the Virginia, Maryland, and Pennsylvania divisions.

During the winter of 1778–1779, Putnam and his troops were encamped at the site now preserved as the Putnam Memorial State Park in Redding, Connecticut. On February 26, 1779, Putnam escaped from the British, riding down a steep slope in Greenwich, Connecticut for which he became famous. A statue commemorating this escape was erected at Putnam Memorial State Park. In December 1779, Putnam suffered a paralyzing stroke which ended his military service.

== Personality and characteristics ==
Israel Putnam did not fit the stereotype of the taciturn New Englander. He was a gregarious tavern-keeper, a very industrious farmer, and an aggressive soldier, always looking for an excuse to discipline his soldiers. His farm was one of the most productive in the area; he bought out his partner and paid off his mortgage after only two years. In battle, he would lead from the front, not from behind. After hours, he would lead his comrades in singing the popular drinking songs of the day.

Putnam served as Washington's second in command, and the two shared some key characteristics that other general officers of the time did not. Neither of them had as much education as some of their peers, and certainly not as elite as their British counterparts. Putnam's lack of education and unsophisticated manner prompted a captured Hessian officer to comment, "This old gray-beard may be a good honest man, but nobody but the rebels would have made him a general." Some of America's proper Philadelphians agreed. However, the common soldier admired Putnam's courage and could see from his many visible battle scars that he knew what it was like to be on the front lines. They knew that he had achieved his position through first-hand experience, rather than just education or family connections. Historian Nathaniel Philbrick says flatly that "Israel Putnam was the provincial army's most beloved officer."

Putnam's spelling was a language all its own, yet he still had a way with words. Both Washington and Putnam had to use their powers of persuasion to put down mutinies from their long-suffering, disgruntled troops. Biographer David Humphreys witnessed the Putnam event:

"The troops who had been badly fed, badly cloathed and worse paid ... formed the design of marching to Hartford, where the General Assembly was then in session, and of demanding redress at the point of the bayonet. Word having been brought to General Putnam that the second Brigade was under arms for this purpose, he mounted his horse, galloped to the Cantonment and thus addressed them:

"'My brave lads, whither are you going? Do you intend to desert your Officers and to invite the enemy to follow you into the country? Whose cause have you been fighting and suffering so long in, is it not your own? Have you no property, no parents, wives or children? You have behaved like men so far – all the world is full of your praises – and posterity will stand astonished at your deeds: but not if you spoil all at last. Don't you consider how much the country is distressed by the war, and that your officers have not been any better paid than yourselves? But we all expect better times and that the Country will do us ample justice. Let us all stand by one another then and fight it out like brave Soldiers. Think what a shame it would be for Connecticut men to run away from their officers.'"

Putnam's speech worked. After he finished, "he directed the acting Major of Brigade to give the word for them to shoulder, march to their Regimental parades, and lodge arms. All of which they executed with promptitude and apparent good humor."

After hearing of the mutiny, Washington wrote to Putnam commending him for his success in quelling it. Putnam wrote to Washington that the incident had "not been repeated, or attended with any farther ill consequences.".

Both Washington and Putnam were aggressive by nature and did not hesitate to put themselves in harm's way if that was what was called for in battle. Both were able to function calmly while bullets whizzed around them. Yet, each was nevertheless able to calculate risk and make decisions accordingly. After leading inexperienced men in a successful engagement while being bombarded with cannonballs, Putnam commented, "I wish we could have something of the kind to do every day; it would teach our men how little danger there is from cannon balls, for though they have sent a great many at us, nobody has been hurt by them."

Putnam has been criticized by historians as having not been a great strategic thinker. He once grew tired of the endless discussion during one of the planning sessions during the siege of Boston with Washington and his senior officers, so he went to the window and started observing the British. Washington invited him back to the planning table, and Putnam responded, "Oh, my dear General, you may plan the battle to suit yourself, and I will fight it."

However, Putnam did have the ability to see both effective battlefield strategy and the big picture. He ordered his men to aim for the British officers, knowing the crippling effect that it would have. He knew the value of inoculating the American troops against small pox, and the tendency of nervous soldiers to fire too soon and aim too high—thus the orders to not fire until "you see the whites of their eyes" and to "take aim at the waistbands".

Putnam had a feel for the common soldier and how to make good use of him. He knew that a soldier was not worried about his head, but if his body was protected with earthworks, he would "fight forever." Putnam also understood that a retreat could be a very effective tactic. "Let me pick my officers, and I would not fear to meet [the enemy] with half the number... I would fight them on the retreat, and every stone wall we passed should be lined with their dead ... our men are lighter of foot, they understand their grounds and how to take advantage of them."

In some instances, he was more prescient than his fellow generals. Putnam advocated aggressive action against the British in discussion with Joseph Warren and General Artemas Ward before the Battle of Bunker Hill. Ward replied, "As peace and reconciliation is what we seek for, would it not be better to act only on the defensive and give no unnecessary provocation?" Putnam turned to Warren and said with emphasis, "You know, Dr. Warren, we shall have no peace worth anything, till we gain it by the sword."

Shortly after Washington took command at Cambridge in 1775, he and the other generals hoped for a speedy resolution of the war. On one occasion with them gathered around his dinner table, Washington offered a toast: "A speedy and honorable peace." A few days later, Putnam offered a different one: "A long and moderate war." The sober and seldom-smiling Washington laughed out loud and replied, "You are the last man, General Putnam, from whom I should have expected such a toast, you who are always urging vigorous measures, to plead now for a long, and what is still more extraordinary, a moderate, war, seems strange indeed." Putnam replied that a false peace would divide Americans and not be long-lasting. "I expect nothing but a long war, and I would have it a moderate one, that we may hold out till the mother country becomes willing to cast us off forever."

The Revolutionary War dragged on for eight and a half years, the longest in United States history until the Vietnam War. Washington did not forget Putnam's prescient toast; he more than once reminded Putnam of it.

== Burial ==
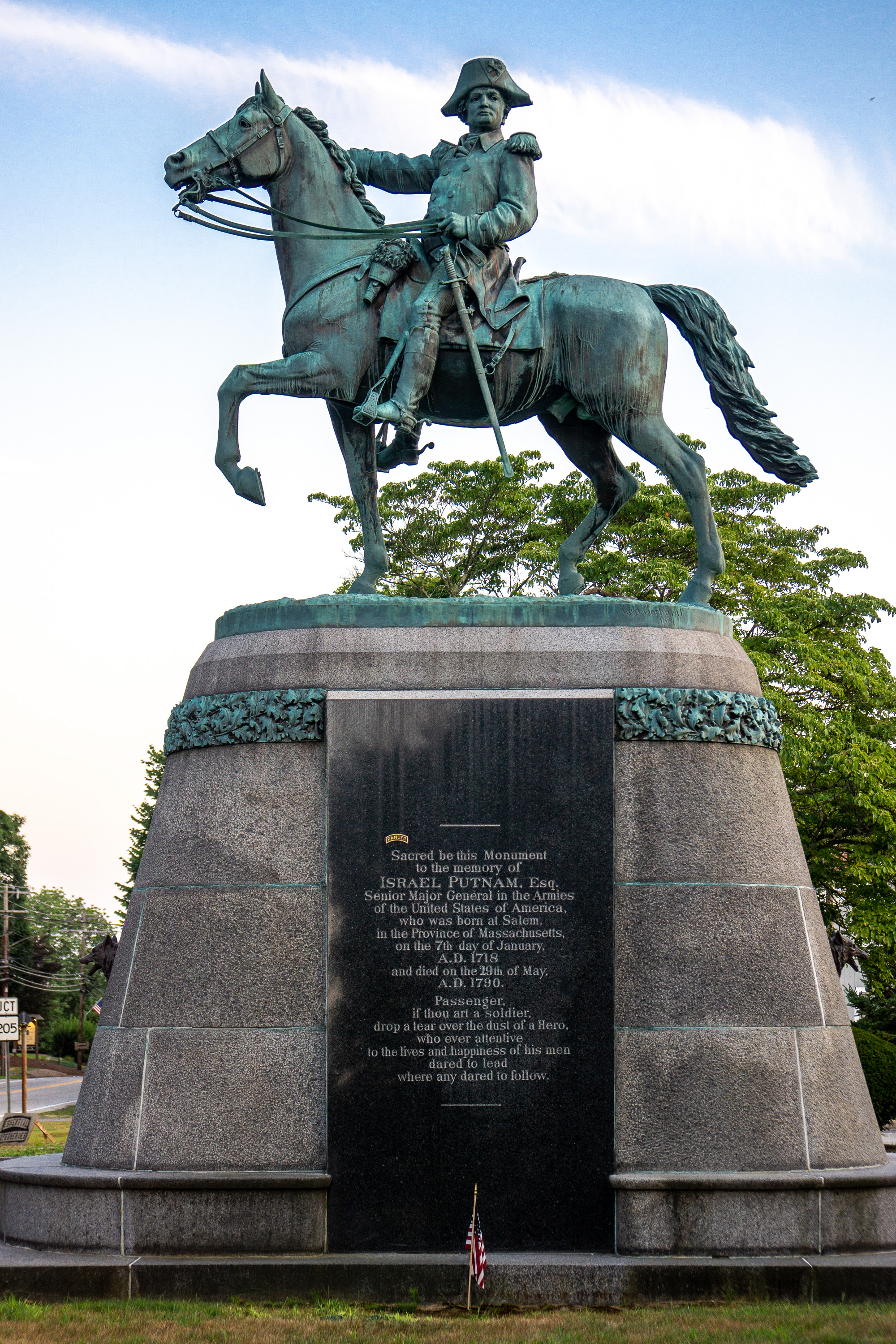
Israel Putnam Monument, Brooklyn Connecticut

Putnam died in Brooklyn, Connecticut in 1790. He was buried in an above-ground tomb in the town's South Cemetery. He is honored with an equestrian monument near his original burial site on Canterbury Road (Route 169).

Over the years, souvenir hunters removed fragments of the headstone of his tomb. The marble marker eventually became badly mutilated, and the overall condition of the tomb was deemed unsuitable for General Putnam's remains; it was removed for safekeeping to the Connecticut State Capitol in Hartford. Sculptor Karl Gerhardt designed the Soldiers' and Sailors' Monument in Hartford, as well as Civil War monuments in New York and New Jersey, and he was chosen to create a monument to house Putnam's remains. In 1888, Putnam's remains were removed from the Brooklyn cemetery and reinterred in a sarcophagus in the base of that monument, and the original headstone inscription was recreated.

== Legacy, namesakes, and honors ==
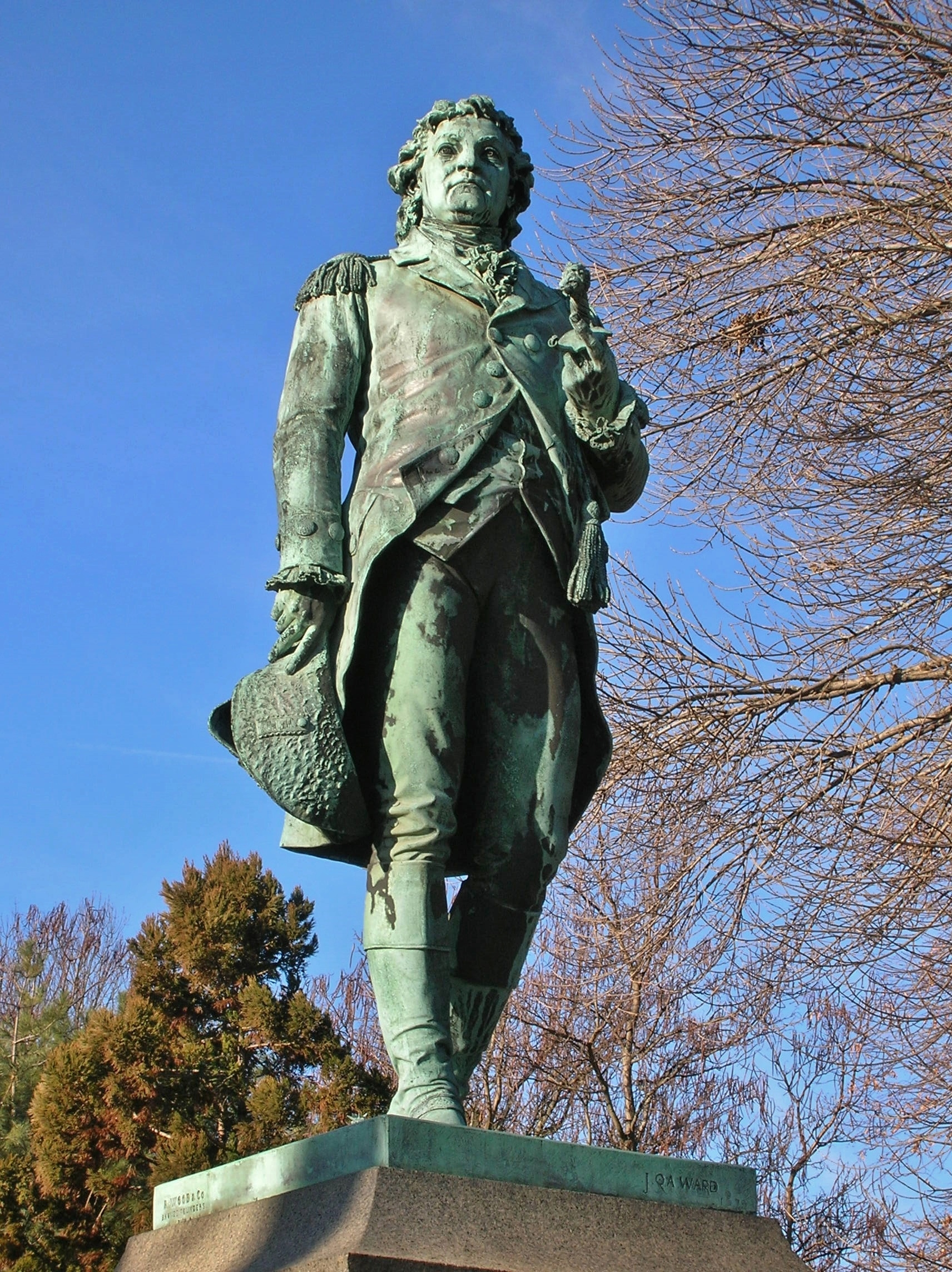
Statue of Israel Putnam by John Quincy Adams Ward

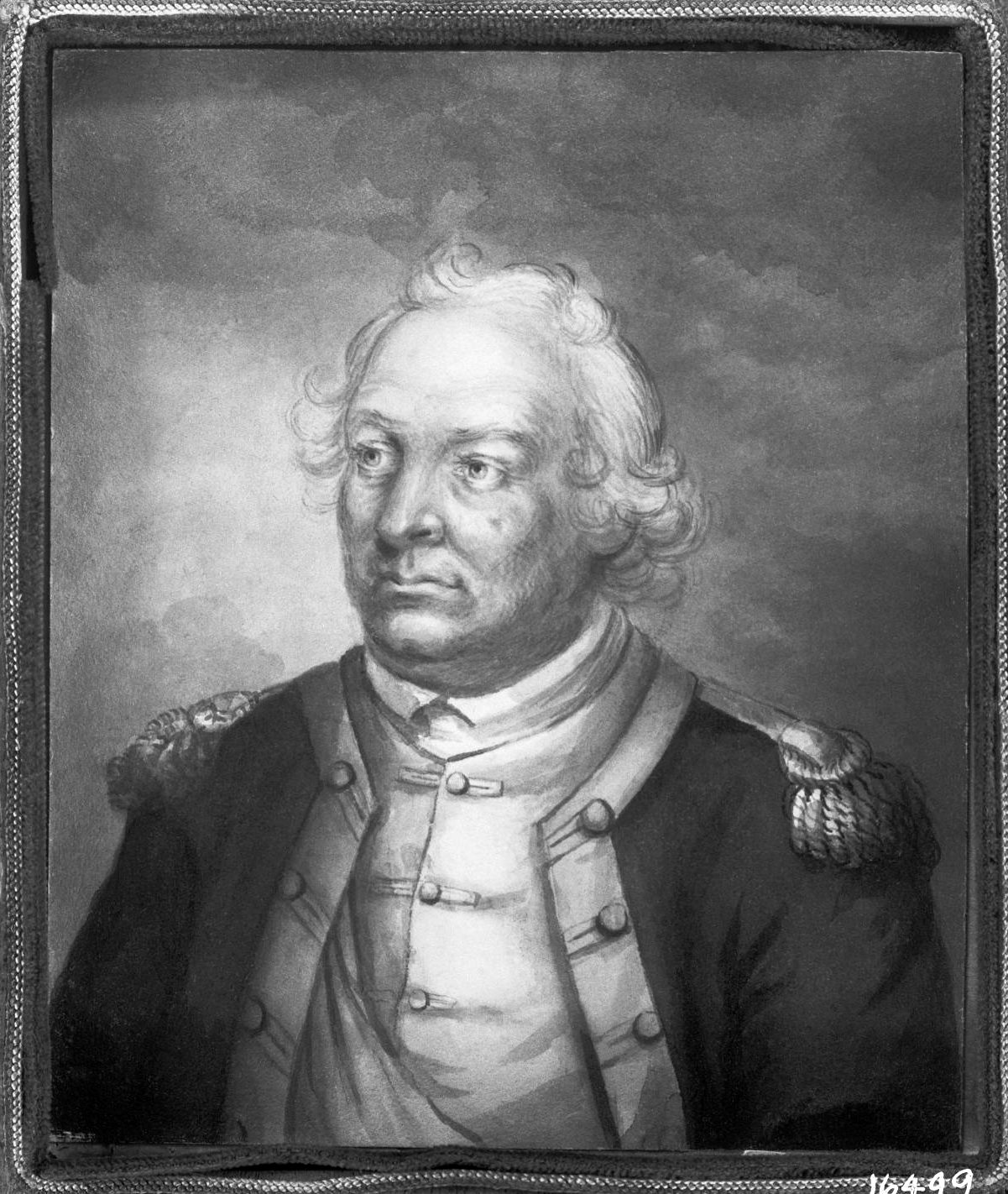
Posthumous Portrait of General Israel Putnam by Ann Hall, after painting by John Trumbull, undated. Watercolor and sepia wash on parchment, 4 1/2 x 3 1/2 in., presently unlocated.

Putnam's birthplace in Danvers, Massachusetts is now known as the Putnam House, designated and preserved as a historic structure. His Connecticut farmhouse on Putnam Farm still stands and is listed on the National Register of Historic Places. A statue of Israel Putnam stands in Hartford's Bushnell Park, near the Connecticut State Capitol. It was sculpted by John Quincy Adams Ward in 1873 and presented to the city in 1874.

Numerous places bear his name, including eight counties, starting with Putnam County, New York, which embraces the east bank of the Hudson Highlands where he once held command. Towns in New York and Connecticut are also named for him. His many namesakes include:

- Putnam County, Georgia
- Putnam County, Illinois
- Putnam County, Indiana
- Putnam County, Missouri
- Putnam County, New York
- Putnam County, Ohio
- Putnam County, Tennessee
- Putnam County, West Virginia
- Putnam, Connecticut
- Putnam, New York
- Israel Putnam Refectory, a dining hall at the University of Connecticut
- The Israel Putnam School, a historic school in Putnam, Connecticut
- East Putnam Avenue in Greenwich, Connecticut, named for his path of retreat from the British
- Putnam's cottage, an 18th-century residence that may have served as a tavern at the time of his escape, located on East Putnam Avenue in Greenwich
- Putnam Farm, the remnant of Putnam's original 500-acre holding in Brooklyn, Connecticut
- Putnam Memorial State Park, the oldest state park in Connecticut, where an Equestrian statue of Israel Putnam by Anna Hyatt Huntington was dedicated in 1969
- Putnam Avenue, in Port Chester, New York, a continuation of the avenue of the same name in Greenwich, Connecticut.
- Putnam Drive, in Port Chester, New York
- Putnam Avenue in Hamden, Connecticut
- Putnam Avenue in Hurricane, West Virginia
- Putnam Avenue in Brooklyn, New York
- Putnam Street in Scranton, Pennsylvania
- Putnam Street in Olean, New York
- Putnam Pond and Putnam Creek in Ticonderoga and Crown Point, NY
- Putnam Mountain in Washington County, NY. Coordinates: 43.4909,-73.5307
- Putnam Place in the Bronx, New York, which stands among other local neighborhood streets named for figures from the Revolutionary War and War of 1812
- Israel Putnam Lodge No. 46, Ancient Free and Accepted Masons of the State of Connecticut, located in Woodstock, Connecticut
- Israel Putnam Brown Ale, a beer brewed by Black Pond Brews of Danielson, Connecticut
- Putnam Avenue in Cambridge, Massachusetts
- Putnam Engine & Hose Co., No. 2, a Company of the Port Chester, New York Fire Department organized in 1854
- Putnam Russet Apple. Putnam had a very successful farm in Brooklyn, Connecticut, which was known for its apples and sheep. The farmhouse at Putnam Farm still stands, and the Putnam Russet is still grown by farmers of heirloom apple varieties.
- Putnam Pond, a body of water (and adjacent campground) near Ticonderoga, New York, known locally as "Putt's Pond"
- Several ships including the USS General Putnam
- In the 1992 film My Cousin Vinny, the protagonist and his paramour stay in the General Putnam Motel in Eatonton, Georgia.

== Bibliography ==
- Borneman, Walter R. (2014). American Spring: Lexington, Concord, and the Road to Revolution (book). New York, Boston, London: Little, Brown and Company. ISBN 978-0-316-22102-3.
- Cray, Robert E. (2001). Bunker Hill Refought: Memory Wars and Partisan Conflicts, 1775-1825 (PDF). Historical Journal of Massachusetts. Archived from the original (PDF) on May 5, 2016.
- Ferling, John (2015). Whirlwind, The American Revolution and the War That Won it. Bloomsbury Press, New York, London. ISBN 9781620401736.
- Hubbard, Robert Ernest (2017). Major General Israel Putnam: Hero of the American Revolution. Jefferson, North Carolina: McFarland & Company. p. 256. ISBN 978-1-4766-6453-8.
- Humphreys, David (1804). The Miscellaneous Works of David Humphreys: Late Minister Plenipotentiary to the Court of Madrid. T. and J. Swords., 394 pages
- Humphreys, David (1855). Life of Israel Putnam, Major-General in the Army of the United States. New York, New York: Sheldon, Lamport & Blakeman., 394 pages
- "Israel Putnam - Sons of the American Revolution, Connecticut | Bragg, Fanny Greye". connecticutsar.org. Archived from the original on January 24, 2007.
- Ketchum, Richard M. (1963). The Battle for Bunker Hill. London, England: The Cresset Press.
- Ketchum, Richard (1999). Decisive Day: The Battle for Bunker Hill. Pickle Partners Publishing. ISBN 978-0-8050-6099-7.
- Livingston, William Farrand (1901). Israel Putnam: Pioneer, Ranger and Major General, 1718-1790. New York and London: Putnam's Sons. ISBN 9780598058287.
- Mark, Steven Paul (November 20, 2013). "Too Little Too Late: Battle Of The Hudson Highlands". Journal of the American Revolution.
- McCullough, David (2005). 1776. New York, NY: Simon & Schuster. ISBN 978-0-7432-2671-4.
- Nelson, James L. (2011). With Fire and Sword: the Battle of Bunker Hill and the Beginning of the American Revolution. New York, New York: St. Martin's Press. ISBN 978-0-312-57644-8.
- Parkman, Francis (1922). Montcalm and Wolfe, Vol. 1. Little Brown & Co. – via Googlebooks.
- Philbrick, Nathaniel (2013). Bunker Hill: A City, a Siege, a Revolution. New York, New York: Viking Press. ISBN 978-0-670-02544-2.
- Purcell, Sarah J. (2010). Sealed with Blood: War, Sacrifice, and Memory in Revolutionary America. University of Pennsylvania Press. ISBN 9780812203028., pages covering account
- Tarbox, Increase N. (1876). Life of Israel Putnam ("Old Put"): Major-general in the Continental Army. Lockwood, Brooks. p. 38. "israel putnam, increase tarbox."
