= Gibbet Hill =

Gibbet Hill may refer to:

- Gibbet Hill (County Wexford), a summit and marilyn in Ireland
- Gibbet Hill (Massachusetts), a summit in the United States
- Gibbet Hill (University of Warwick), a university campus in Warwickshire, England
- Gibbet Hill, Hindhead, a summit in Surrey, England
- Gibbet Hill (short story), an 1890 short story by Bram Stoker

== See also ==
- Gibbett Hill Formation, Eastern Newfoundland, Canada
- Gibbet Mill (disambiguation)
