= Israel Putnam Monument =

Equestrian statue in Brooklyn, Connecticut

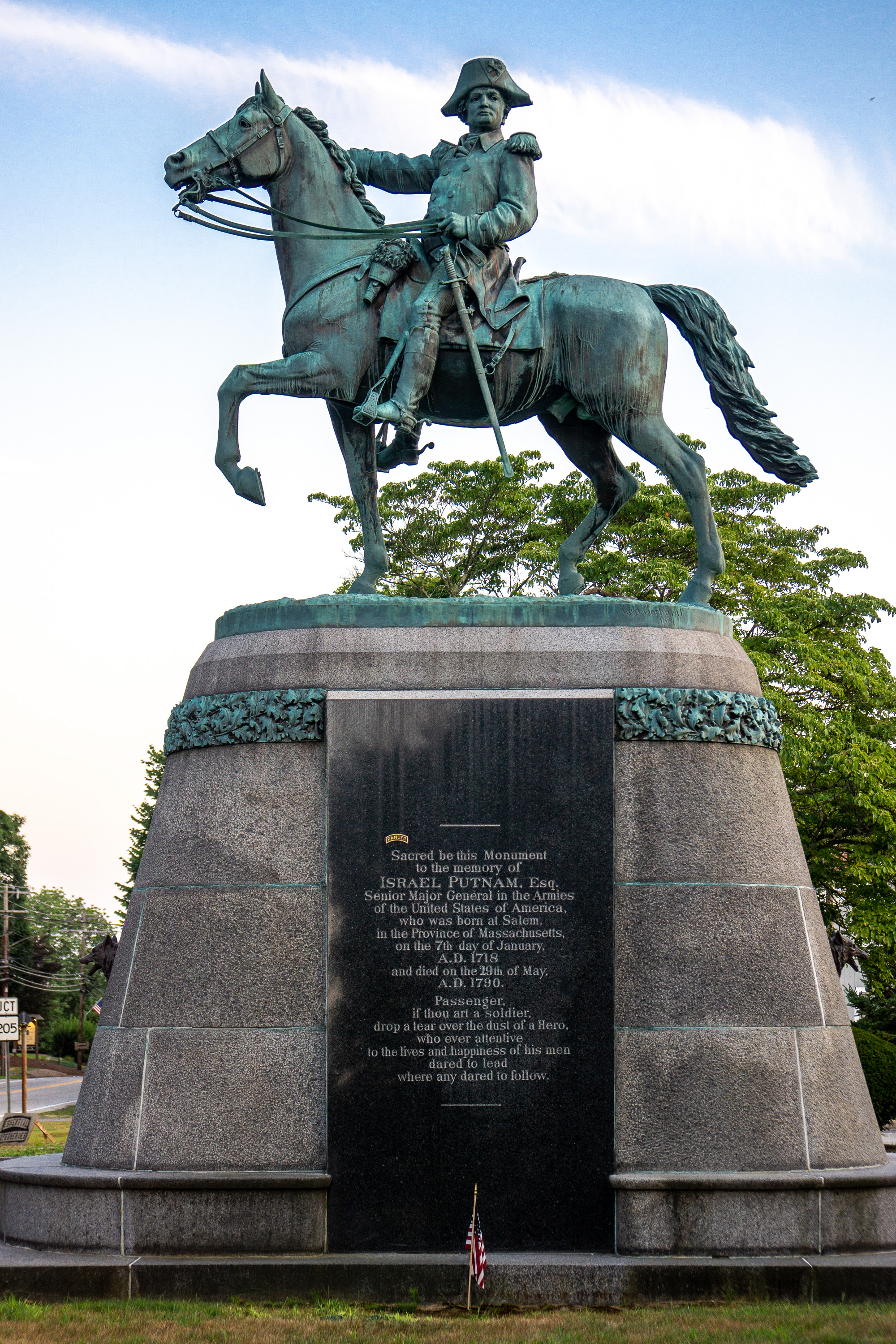
- The monument in 2020
- Location: Brooklyn, Connecticut, United States
- Coordinates: 41°47′11″N 71°56′59″W
- Designer: Karl Gerhardt
- Fabricator: Henry-Bonnard Bronze Company
- Type: Equestrian statue
- Material: Bronze; Granite
- Length: 250 inches (6.4 m)
- Width: 150 inches (3.8 m)
- Height: 300 inches (7.6 m)
- Dedicated date: June 14, 1888
- Dedicated to: Israel Putnam

The Israel Putnam Monument is an equestrian statue located in Brooklyn, Connecticut, United States. The monument, designed by sculptor Karl Gerhardt, was dedicated in 1888 in honor of Israel Putnam, a Connecticut native who served as a general in the Continental Army during the American Revolutionary War. The monument was created as a response to the deteriorated condition of Putnam's grave in Brooklyn's cemetery, and the state government allocated funds for the monument with the provision that it also serve as a tomb for Putnam. Upon its completion, Putnam's remains were reinterred under the monument. The dedication was held on June 14 in a large ceremony with several guests of honor, including the governors of Connecticut and Rhode Island. The monument was criticized by contemporary reviewers, who especially criticized the horse, with one review noting that it appeared to be suffering from bone spavin.

== History ==
=== Background ===
Israel Putnam was a military officer from Brooklyn, Connecticut. Originally from Salem, Massachusetts, he had moved to Brooklyn in 1739 and participated in the French and Indian War from 1755 to 1762. Soon after the Battles of Lexington and Concord, Putnam became involved on the side of the American revolutionaries, organizing a regiment in Windham County, Connecticut, and becoming a major general in the Continental Army. Following the war, Putnam returned to Brooklyn, where he died in 1790. He was buried in the town's South Cemetery. Following his death, several memorials and monuments began to be erected in his honor, with the first being his tomb, a brick structure covered by a large stone slab that bore an inscription composed by Timothy Dwight IV, future president of Yale University. In 1874, a statue of Israel Putnam designed by sculptor John Quincy Adams Ward was dedicated in Bushnell Park in Hartford, Connecticut, the state capital. In Brooklyn, there had been a push to erect another monument to Putnam in the 1850s, though these plans ultimately did not come to fruition.

=== Creation ===
By the 1880s, the stone slab covering Putnam's tomb had significantly deteriorated due to vandalism. In late 1885, N. W. Kennedy, the editor of the Windham County Standard, began to urge for the creation of a new monument to honor Putnam. At a meeting he had organized, a group of citizens from the county formed the Putnam Monument Association with the goal of raising US$10,000 for the creation of this monument. Additionally, it was decided that, if the association was unable to attain this money through local fundraising, they would petition either the U.S. Congress or the Connecticut General Assembly for assistance. By the time a subsequent meeting was held, only $500 had been raised, at which time the association decided to petition the General Assembly for $10,000, with the hope that an additional $5,000 could be raised through local fundraising. The appropriation passed the legislature with only one dissenting vote from a legislator who stated that his constituents should not have to fund a project that the federal government should be financing.

On February 19, 1886, the Connecticut government created a committee composed of seven Connecticut citizens to oversee the project, which included politicians George P. McLean and George G. Sumner. That same day, the committee approved of holding a contest and soliciting designs from artists for the monument, with the only constraints being that the monument not cost more than $10,000 and that the proposal be submitted by May 15, 1886. The winner would receive a compensation of $250. Of the 25 designs that were submitted, the one from Karl Gerhardt was in the form of an equestrian statue, and subsequently the committee decided that that type of monument should be chosen. Another competition was held, this time explicitly seeking out equestrian statue designs, and four design proposals were considered. (Note: Sources disagree on exactly who participated in this second competition. An 1888 article in The American Architect and Building News listed Gerhardt, George Keller, E. S. Woods, and the Smith Granite Company, while a commemorative program created by the Putnam Monument Commission that same year lists Gerhardt, Woods, George Edwin Bissell, and the Monumental Bronze Company.) Ultimately, Gerhardt's design was selected, and he was given both the $250 payment and the remaining $9,750 to create the monument. Gerhardt was a native of Hartford and had previously studied sculpture in Paris, having some of his works displayed in the Salon. As per the contract between him and the committee signed in October 1886, he would be responsible for designing a bronze equestrian statue and accompanying stone pedestal, which would be submitted for approval by October 1, 1887, at the latest.

Around the same time that Gerhardt's design was selected, the committee began to consider the location for the monument. While the letter of the law stated that the monument was to be erected "over the grave" of Putnam, some in Brooklyn opined that the cemetery where he was buried was not a sufficient location for a monument as large and costly as the one they had planned. As a result, Putnam's descendants decided that his remains would be exhumed and buried under the monument wherever it was to be erected in Brooklyn. This led to a great deal of local controversy and debate over the location, with the New-York Tribune even reporting on the debates in an August 1886 article. Ultimately, the committee selected a plot of land near the center of town, just south of the town green. This property was donated to the state by Brooklyn citizen Thomas Smith Marlor, who also furnished the pedestal for the statue. Additionally, the original stone cover for Putnam's grave was moved to safekeeping in the Connecticut State Capitol, while a replica of the stone marked the former location of the grave. Putnam's remains would be reinterred under the monument in a metal coffin. With the location selected and an additional $500 allocated by the town of Brooklyn for advertising and other expenses, the committee stated in a January 1887 report to the General Assembly that they expected the monument to be completed by June 17 of that year. Additionally, the committee stated that the project was not expected to go over-budget and that the statue's size would be comparable to that of the equestrian statue of George Washington in New York City. In May 1887, the General Assembly passed a resolution concerning the dedication for the monument, allocating $6,500 for the unveiling activities. According to the Worcester Society of Antiquity, the total cost of the project was about $20,000.

=== Dedication ===
The monument was dedicated in a ceremony on June 14, 1888. The ceremony began with an invocation prayer given by the Reverend Timothy Dwight V, after which the band present played "Hail, Columbia". Afterwards, monument committee member Morris Seymour gave a speech introducing the statue, at the end of which it was unveiled by John D. Putnam, a descendant of Israel's. A speech was then given by Connecticut Governor Phineas C. Lounsbury, who accepted the statue on behalf of the state. The band then played "The Star-Spangled Banner", following which Professor Charles F. Johnson of the Trinity College in Hartford read a poem. Committee member Henry C. Robinson then gave a memorial address in honor of Putnam, followed by a playing of "America" and a military review by the governor of several military organizations that had attended the ceremony. At the end of the ceremony, Rhode Island Governor Royal C. Taft gave a speech in honor of those who fought in the American Revolution, while William H. Putnam (Israel's last living grandson), Gerhardt, and Marlor were invited onto the stage and applauded by the crowd.

=== Later history ===
In the 1980s, two bronze wolf heads (the emblem of the Putnam family) located on the front and back of the monument were stolen in an act of vandalism. In 1993, the monument was surveyed as part of the Save Outdoor Sculpture! project.

== Design ==
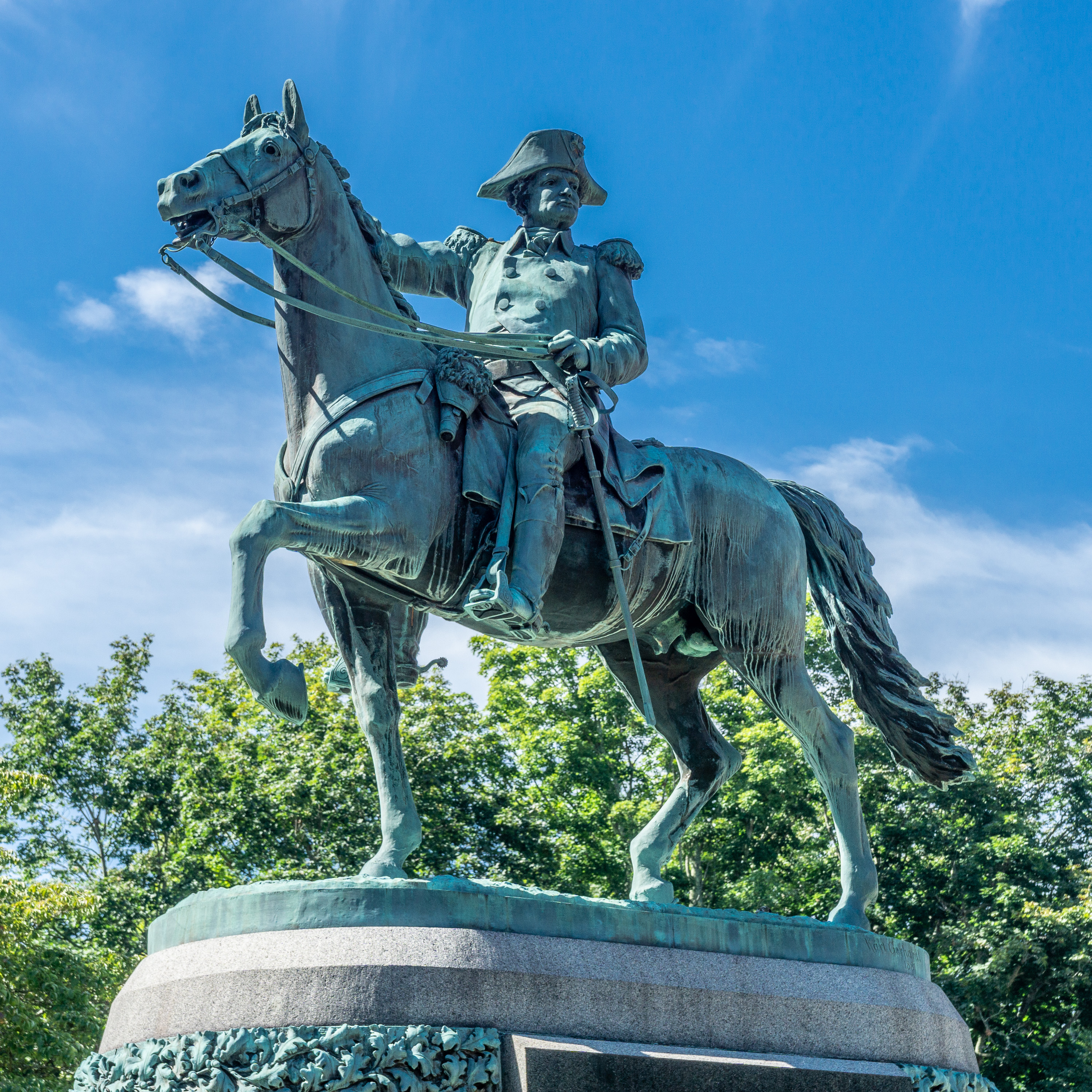
A close-up of the statue, 2020

The monument consists of an equestrian statue of Putnam, with a height of 144 inches (3.7 m) and side lengths of 96 inches (2.4 m) and 48 inches (1.2 m), atop a granite pedestal measuring 156 inches (4.0 m) tall and with side measurements of 250 inches (6.4 m) and 150 inches (3.8 m). The statue is made of bronze and depicts Putnam in his Revolutionary War attire, including a tricorne and a sword hanging from his left side. He is holding the reins of the horse with his left hand and pointing forward with his right hand, while the horse has its front left leg lifted. The statue rests on an oval base that is surrounded by a garland of bronze oak leaves. The bronze base of the statue bears inscriptions of the sculptor (KARL GERHARDT / 1887) and manufacturer (The Henry-Bonnard Bronze Co. / N.Y.), while two large polished plaques are found on either side of the pedestal and bear the following inscriptions:

If a Patriot, / remember the distinguished / and / gallant services / rendered thy country / by the Patriot who sleeps / beneath this marble; / if thou art honest, generous and worthy, / render a cheerful tribute of respect / to a man / whose generosity was singular, / whose honesty was proverbial; / who raised himself / to universal esteem and offices of / eminent distinction / by personal worth and a useful life.

Sacred be this Monument / to the memory of / ISRAEL PUTNAM, Esq. / Senior Major General in the Armies / of the United States of America, / who was born at Salem, / in the Province of Massachusetts, / on the 7th day of January, / A.D. 1718 / and died on the 29th of May / A.D. 1790. / Passenger, / if thou art a soldier, / drop a tear over the dust of a Hero, / who ever attentive / to the lives and happiness of his men / dared to lead / where any dared to follow.

The latter inscription is copied from the one on the cover of Putnam's original tomb.

=== Analysis ===
Artistic reception to the statue was fairly poor. A review of the statue in a September 1886 article of The Sun describes it as such: "There is a sinister suggestion of spavin aft, while forward the shoulders and legs are gathered into a spasmodic upward pounce that was never seen on land or any sea horse." In Florence Cole Quinby's 1913 book The Equestrian Monuments of the World, the author suggests that the reviewer for The Sun was exaggerating, stating that the statue was "by no means the least effective of the equestrian statues in America". Another poor review was given by T. H. Bartlett in a June 1888 issue of The American Architect and Building News, who similarly criticized the design of the horse. Another article in The American Architect, published in 1890, calls the statue a "clumsy copy" of Henry Kirke Brown's equestrian statue of Nathanael Greene.

== See also ==
- List of equestrian statues in the United States

== Sources ==
- "Equestrian Monuments – XXXII". The American Architect and Building News. XXX (782). Boston: Ticknor & Company: 183–188. December 20, 1890.
- Bartlett, T. H. (June 16, 1888). "Some American Monuments – IV". The American Architect and Building News. XXIII (651). Ticknor & Company: 279–282.
- A Tourists Guide to Connecticut: Containing Lists of Old and Historical Houses, Historical Sites and Other Things of Interest in the State. Compiled by Rawson W. Haddon. Waterbury, Connecticut: The Mattatuck Historical Society. 1923.
- Jenkins, Elmer, ed. (1947). Guide to America. American Automobile Association. Public Affairs Press. OCLC 2286626927.
- A History of the Equestrian Statue of Israel Putnam, at Brooklyn, Conn. Putnam Monument Commission. Hartford, Connecticut: Press of the Case, Lockwood & Brainard Company. 1888.
- Quinby, Florence Cole (1913). The Equestrian Monuments of the World. New York City. ISBN 978-1-1650-7987-2.
- "Monument to Israel Putnam, Esq., (sculpture)". Smithsonian Institution Research Information System. Archived from the original on October 20, 2021.
- "Report of the Annual Field-Day Excursion to Brooklyn and Putnam's Wolf-Den". Proceedings of the Worcester Society of Antiquity for the Year 1904. XX (4). Worcester, Massachusetts: Worcester Society of Antiquity: 192–204. 1905.
