= General Israel Putnam House =

Historic house in Massachusetts, United States

- Gen. Israel Putnam House
- U.S. National Register of Historic Places
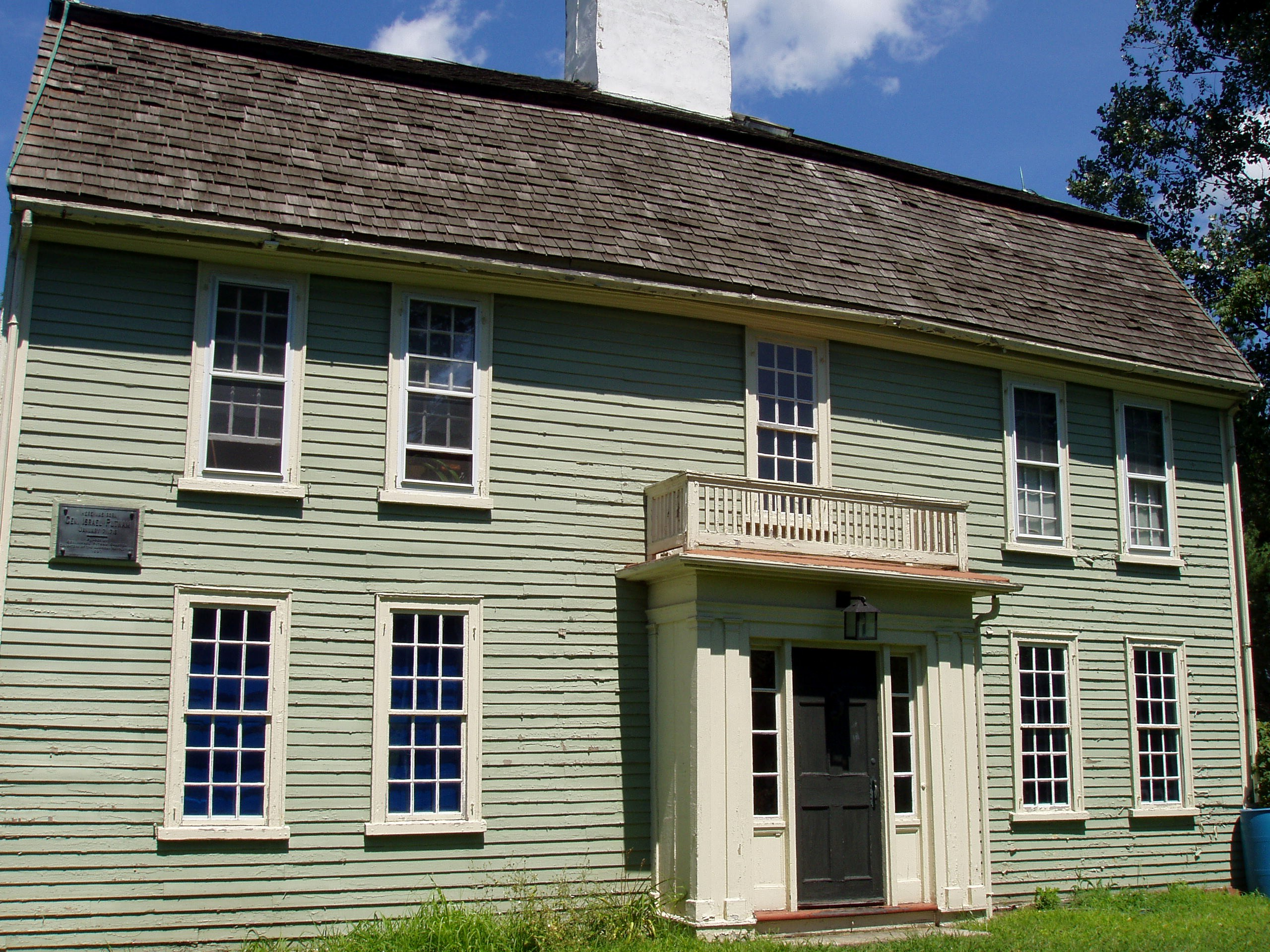
- Putnam House, front view

- Location within Massachusetts Location within the United States
- Location: 431 Maple St., Danvers, Massachusetts
- Coordinates: 42°34′57″N 70°58′2″W
- Built: ca. 1648
- NRHP reference No.: 76000235
- Added to NRHP: April 30, 1976

The General Israel Putnam House in Danvers, Massachusetts, United States, is a historic First Period house recorded in the National Register of Historic Places. The house is also sometimes known as the Thomas Putnam House after Lt. Thomas Putnam (1615–1686), who built the home circa 1648. His grandson, Israel Putnam, the famous general of the American Revolution, was born in the house. Lt. Thomas Putnam was the father of Sgt. Thomas Putnam Jr., (Israel's half-uncle), a notorious figure in the Salem witch trials. The Putnam House is now owned by the Emerson Family, the same owners of Putnam Pantry.

== Description ==
The house was built on 100 acres (40 ha) of farmland owned by Lt. Thomas Putnam, and occupied by the Putnam family for over three centuries. In 1692, Joseph Putnam, the resident of the house at that time, spoke out against the hysteria of the Salem witch trials. His son, Major General Israel Putnam, commander of the colonial troops at the Battle of Bunker Hill, was born in the house on January 7, 1718. In 1991, the Putnam family descendants gave the property to the Danvers Historical Society.

The original house has been augmented by repeated additions. Today, it consists of an irregular 2½ story frame structure, with clapboards and with a pitch roof over one part of the house and gambrel roof over another. It is located at 431 Maple Street, behind Putnam Pantry, a candy and ice cream shop opened by the family on U.S. Route 1.

== Gallery ==
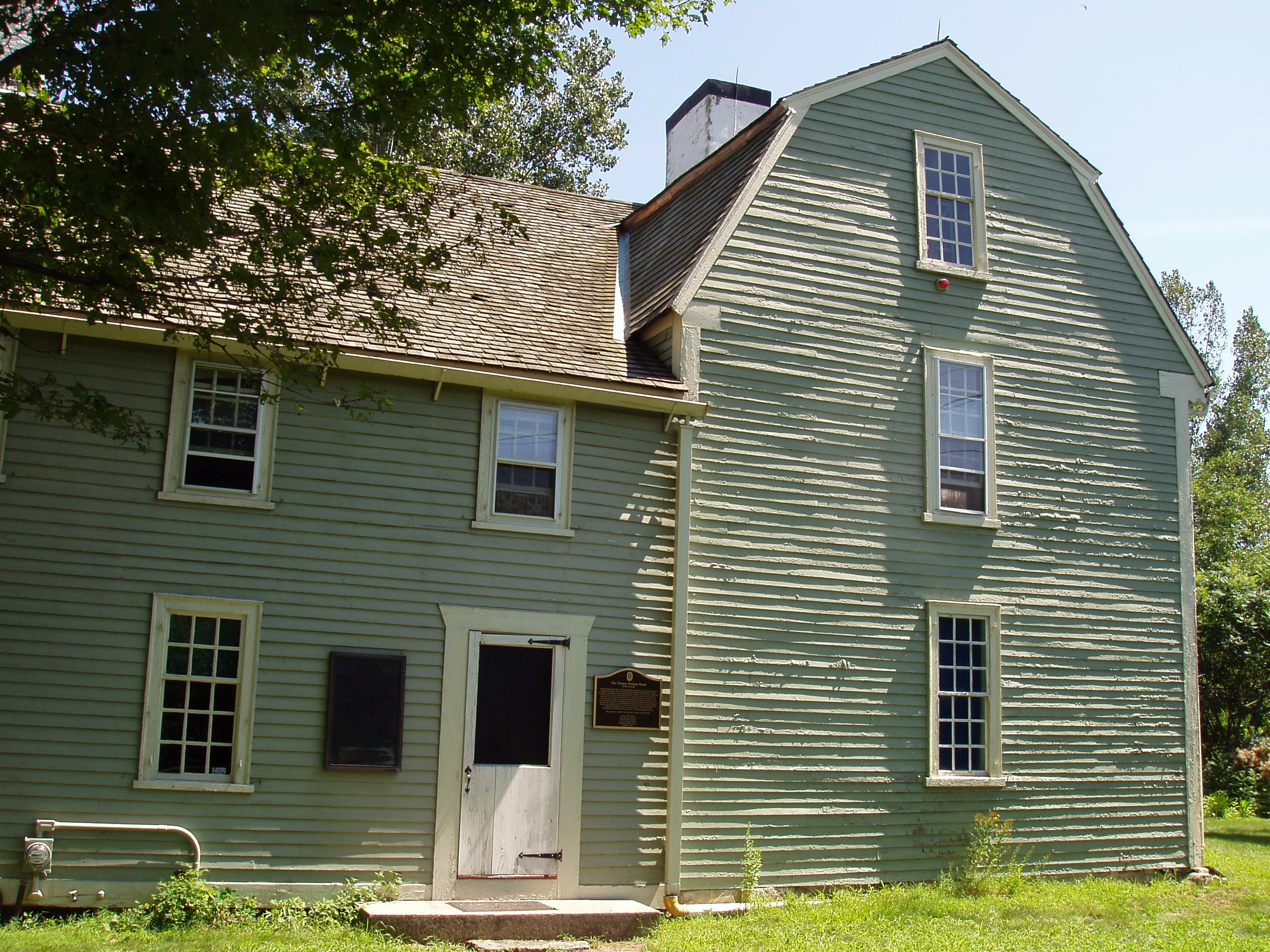

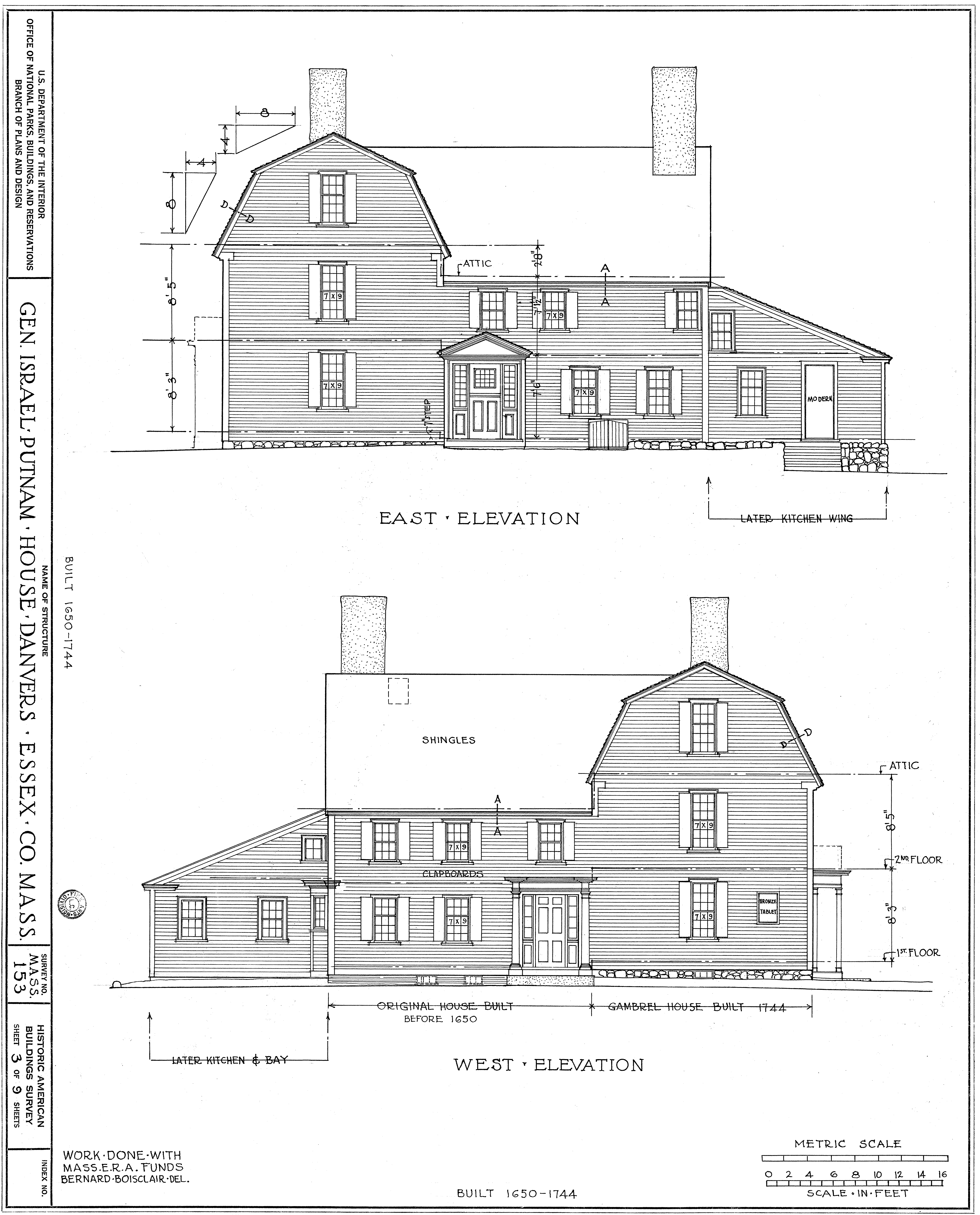
East and west elevations.

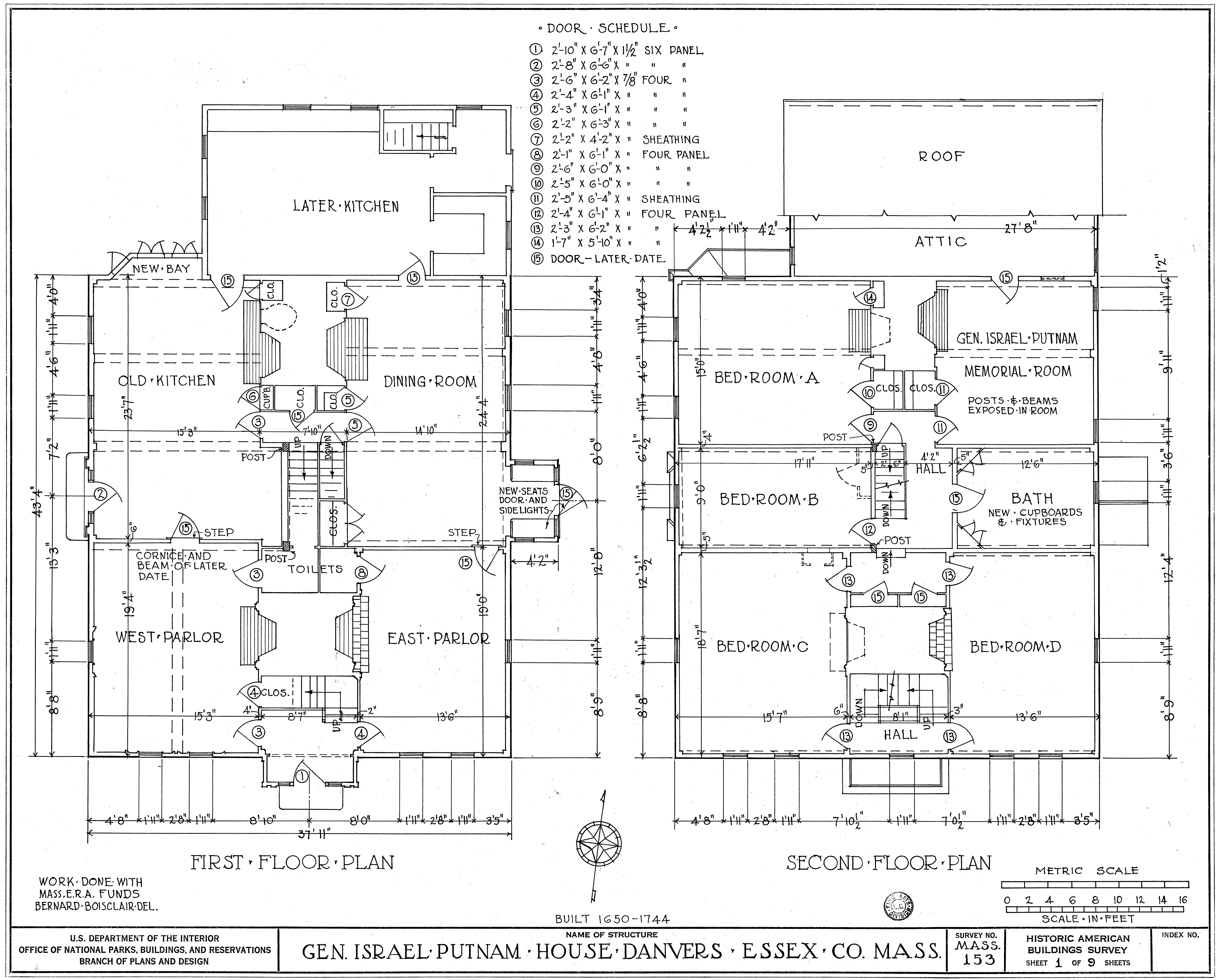
Floor plans.

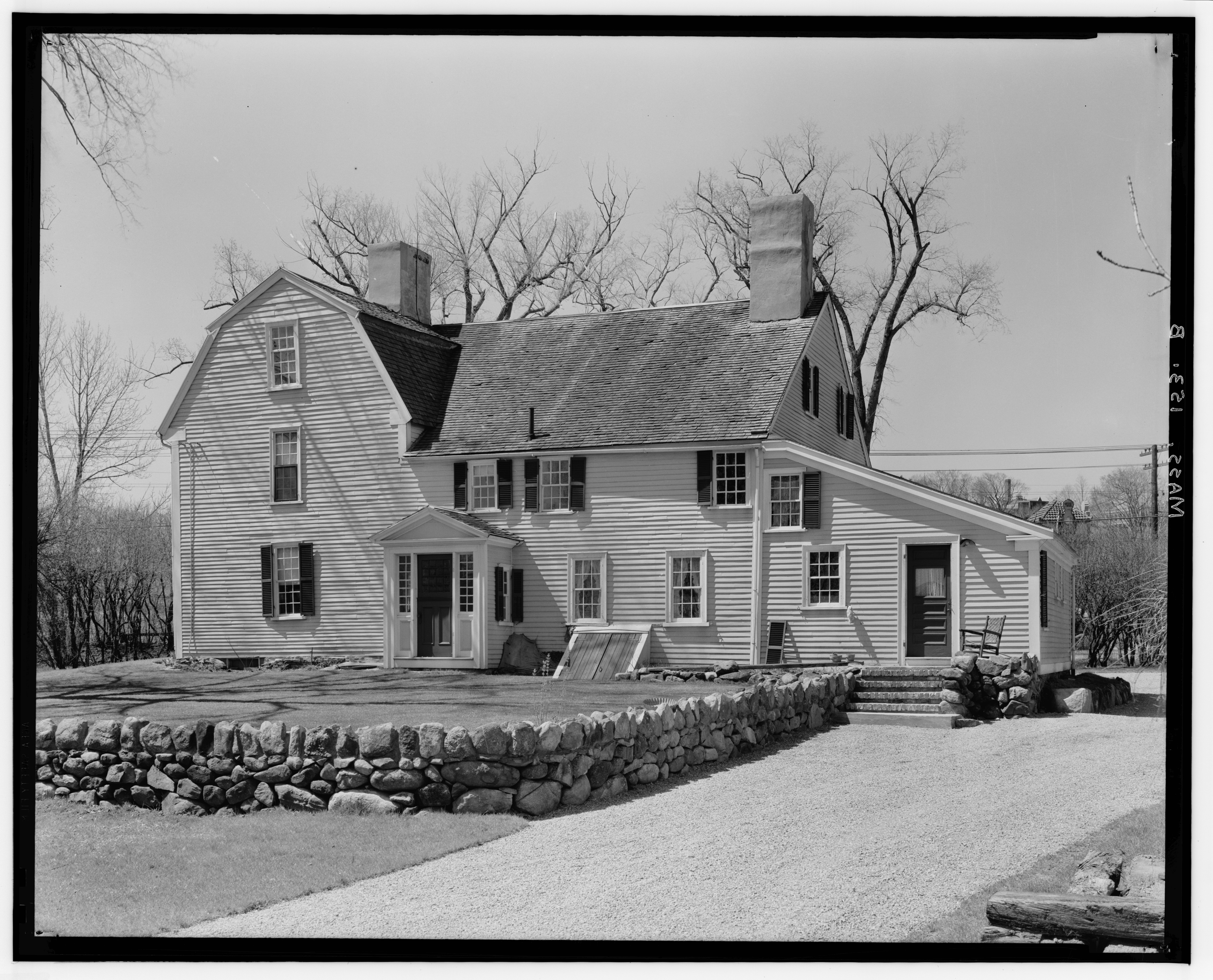

== See also ==
- First Period houses in Massachusetts (1620–1659)
- List of historic houses in Massachusetts
- List of the oldest buildings in Massachusetts
- National Register of Historic Places listings in Essex County, Massachusetts
