= Gibbet Mill =

Gibbet Mill may refer to a number of windmills:

- Gibbet Mill, Rye, East Sussex
- Gibbet Mill, Great Saughall, a windmill in Great Saughall, Cheshire, UK

== See also ==
- Gibbet Hill (disambiguation)
