= Karl Gerhardt =

American sculptor (1853–1940)

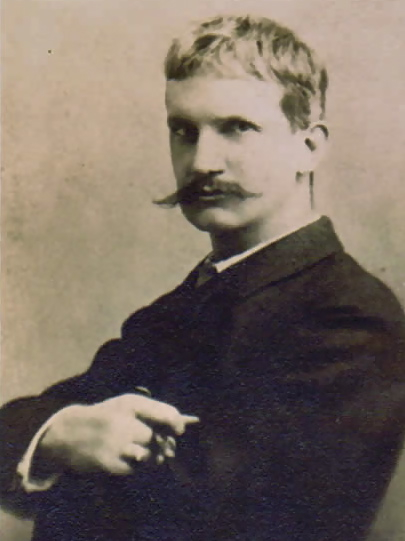
- Karl Gerhardt, c 1879
- Born: January 7, 1853; Boston, Massachusetts
- Died: May 7, 1940 (aged 87); Shreveport, Louisiana
- Notable work: Death mask of Ulysses S. Grant, American Civil War statues
- Spouse: Harriet ("Josie") Josephine Gloyd
- Patrons: Samuel Clemens (Mark Twain)

Karl Gerhardt (January 7, 1853 – May 7, 1940) was an American sculptor, best known for his death mask of President Ulysses S. Grant and a portrait bust of Mark Twain.

== Biography ==
Karl Gerhardt was born in Boston, Massachusetts, on January 7, 1853. He attended Phillips School in Boston. By 1870 he was apprenticed to a house painter in Chicopee, Massachusetts, where he later became a machinist at Ames Foundry. He showed considerable talent in mechanics, and later became a designer of machinery at Hartford, Connecticut.

In 1874, he went to California. By 1880, he had returned east to Hartford, and married Harriet Josephine Gloyd. He worked for a spell as chief machinist at the Pratt and Whitney Machine Tool Company in Hartford and pursued sculpting in his leisure hours.

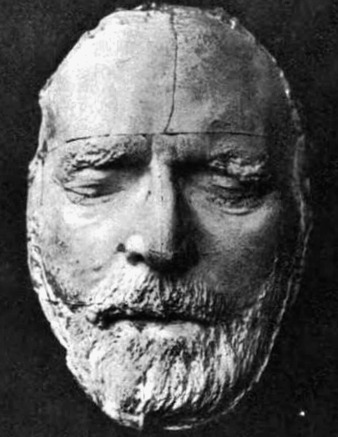
Death mask of Ulysses Grant, 1885

His first known sculpture was a bust of his wife, Josie, titled, A Startled Bather. On February 21, 1881, Harriet Gerhardt knocked on Samuel Clemens's door and asked Clemens to come to their home to view a sculpture that Gerhardt had completed. Clemens went to the couple's home and was surprised to see that the sculpture was a life sized depiction of Josie, nude to the waist. Clemens asked painter James Wells Champney and prominent portrait bust sculptor, John Quincy Adams Ward to evaluate Gerhardt's work. After consulting with the art experts, Clemens and his wife Olivia decided to finance Gerhard's art education in Paris at the École des Beaux-Arts.

With the support of Clemens's prominent artist friends, including Ward, Augustus St. Gaudens and Olin Warner, Gerhardt sailed to Paris with his wife in March 1881. Gerhardt passed the entrance examination to the École des Beaux-Arts on his first attempt and was enrolled in classes by August 1881. Gerhardt soon requested additional money from Clemens to pay for living models and private art instruction. Clemens agreed to the extra funding and offered drawing lessons for Gerhardt's wife, whom Clemens affectionately called "Mrs Joe". By 1883, the Gerhardts were running low on money and sent letters to Clemens asking for more funds. Clemens helped Gerhardt in getting commissions, and was probably instrumental in Gerhardt being given the commission for a Nathan Hale statue for the Connecticut Capitol in Hartford in 1885. A photograph of the portrait bust of Clemens, that Gerhardt created, was used on the frontispiece of Clemens's first edition of The Adventures of Huckleberry Finn.

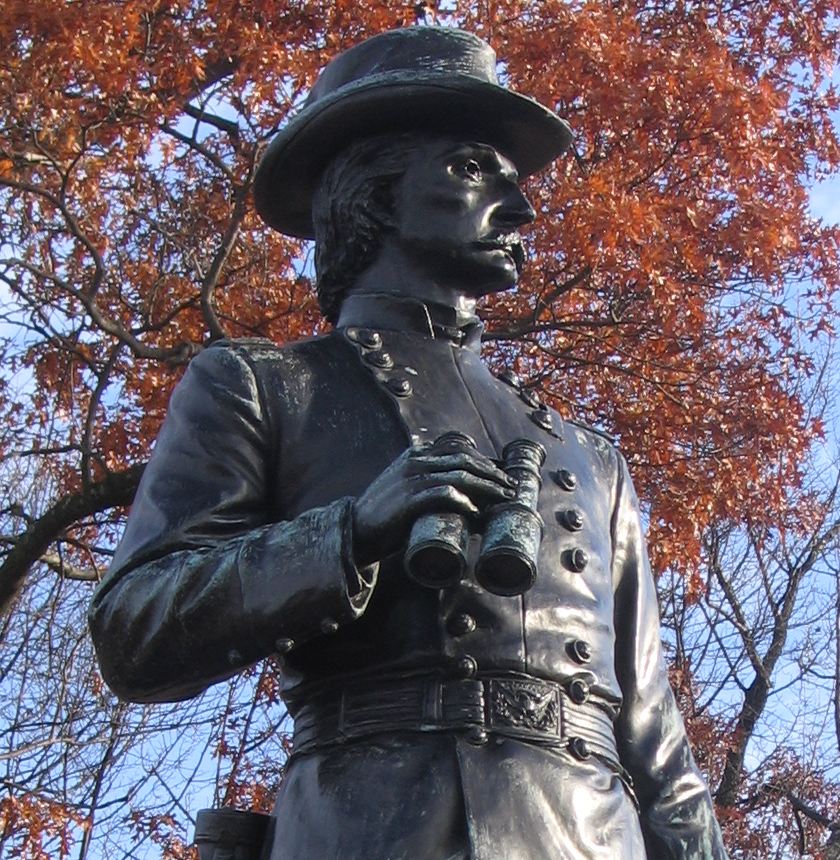
General Warren statue

Over time, Clemens became increasingly dissatisfied with Gerhardt's constant demands for funds and his lack of gratitude. Putting his disappointment aside, Clemens passed along Gerhardt's request to Adam Badeau, Grant's military secretary, to cast the death mask of the terminally ill President Grant. Grant's son Fred agreed to the request. After President Grant had died and the death mask had been cast, Gerhardt refused to give the mask to Grant's family, asserting that the mask was his personal property. Clemens was dismayed by Gerhardt's refusal, and intervened when the family threatened Gerhardt with a lawsuit. Clemens agreed to forgive all debts that Gerhardt owed to Clemens and his wife, an amount of $17,000, in return for returning the mask to Grant's family. It is not known if Clemens was aware at the time that Gerhardt had secretly made a second death mask of Grant.

In the mid- to late 1880s, Gerhardt received commissions for memorial statues in New Jersey, New York, Connecticut, Massachusetts, Vermont, and Pennsylvania. Gerhardt's wife gave birth to a son, Lawrence, in 1890. In the late 1880s, Clemens faced financial difficulties of his own due to investment failures. He closed his mansion in Hartford in 1891 and moved with his family to Europe. Gerhard's sole patron would no longer be able to help him find work. Gerhardt's commissions had decreased dramatically by 1891 and he eventually sought work as a draftsman and machinist. In 1897, Gerhardt was working for bicycle manufacturer, Pope Manufacturing Company in Hartford.

Gerhardt's wife died in 1897 succumbing to tetanus after being injured by a rusty nail. By 1906, Gerhardt had moved to New Orleans. In 1909, it was reported by the New Orleans Times Democrat that the famous sculptor was struggling financially and working as a manual laborer. By 1920, Gerhardt had moved to Shreveport, Louisiana, and was working as a tailor. Gerhardt died May 7, 1940, in Shreveport.

== Selected works ==
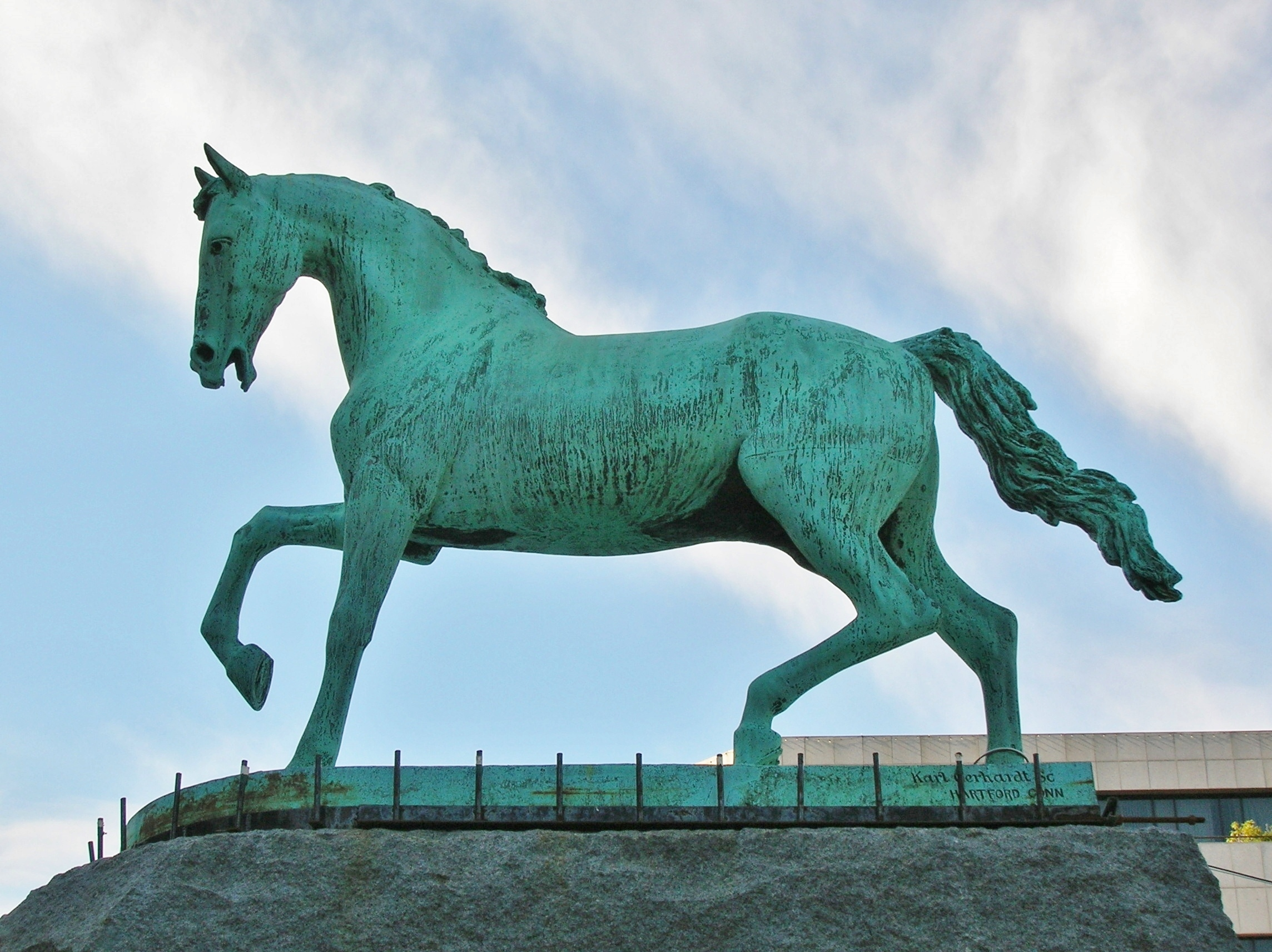
Carrie Welton Fountain (1888), Waterbury, Connecticut

- Statuette of Mercury, marble, Mark Twain House, Hartford, Connecticut, 1883. A copy after a statue at the Naples National Archaeological Museum, in Naples Italy.
- Statuette of Echo, marble, Mark Twain House, Hartford, Connecticut, 1883.
- Bust of Samuel L. Clemens, Mark Twain House, Hartford, Connecticut, 1884.
- Bust of Henry Ward Beecher, marble, Mark Twain House, Hartford, Connecticut, 1885.
- Bust of Ulysses S. Grant, bronze, Connecticut State Library, Hartford, Connecticut, 1885.
- Statue of Nathan Hale, Connecticut State Capitol, Hartford, Connecticut, 1885–86.
- Israel Putnam Monument, Brooklyn, Connecticut, 1887–88.
- Statue of Josiah Bartlett, Huntington Square, Amesbury, Massachusetts, 1888. A signer of the Declaration of Independence.
- Memorial tablet to John Fitch, Connecticut State Capitol, Hartford, Connecticut, 1888.
- Carrie Welton Fountain, The Green, Waterbury, Connecticut, 1888.
- Statue of Seth Boyden, Washington Park, Newark, New Jersey, 1890.
- Statue of Governor Richard Hubbard, Connecticut State Capitol, Hartford, Connecticut, 1890.
- Statue of General George J. Stannard, Lakeview Cemetery, Burlington, Vermont, 1891.
- Sculpture group: Pioneers of the Territory, Iowa State Capitol, Des Moines, Iowa, 1892.
- Statue of Frederick T. Frelinghuysen, Military Park, Newark, New Jersey, 1894–1904.

=== Civil War memorials ===
- Soldiers' Monument, 2nd & Monument Streets, Deposit, New York, 1887–88.
- Soldiers' Monument, Stevens Park, Hoboken, New Jersey, 1887–88.
- Soldiers' and Sailors' Monument, Oneida Square, Utica, New York, 1887–91, George Keller, architect.
- Soldiers' and Sailors' Monument, Brooklyn Post Office, Brooklyn, Connecticut, 1888.
- Statue of Major General Gouverneur K. Warren, Little Round Top, Gettysburg Battlefield, Gettysburg, Pennsylvania, 1888.
- Stannard's Vermont Brigade Monument, Gettysburg Battlefield, Gettysburg, Pennsylvania, 1889.
- 2nd New York Cavalry Monument, Gettysburg Battlefield, Gettysburg, Pennsylvania, 1892.
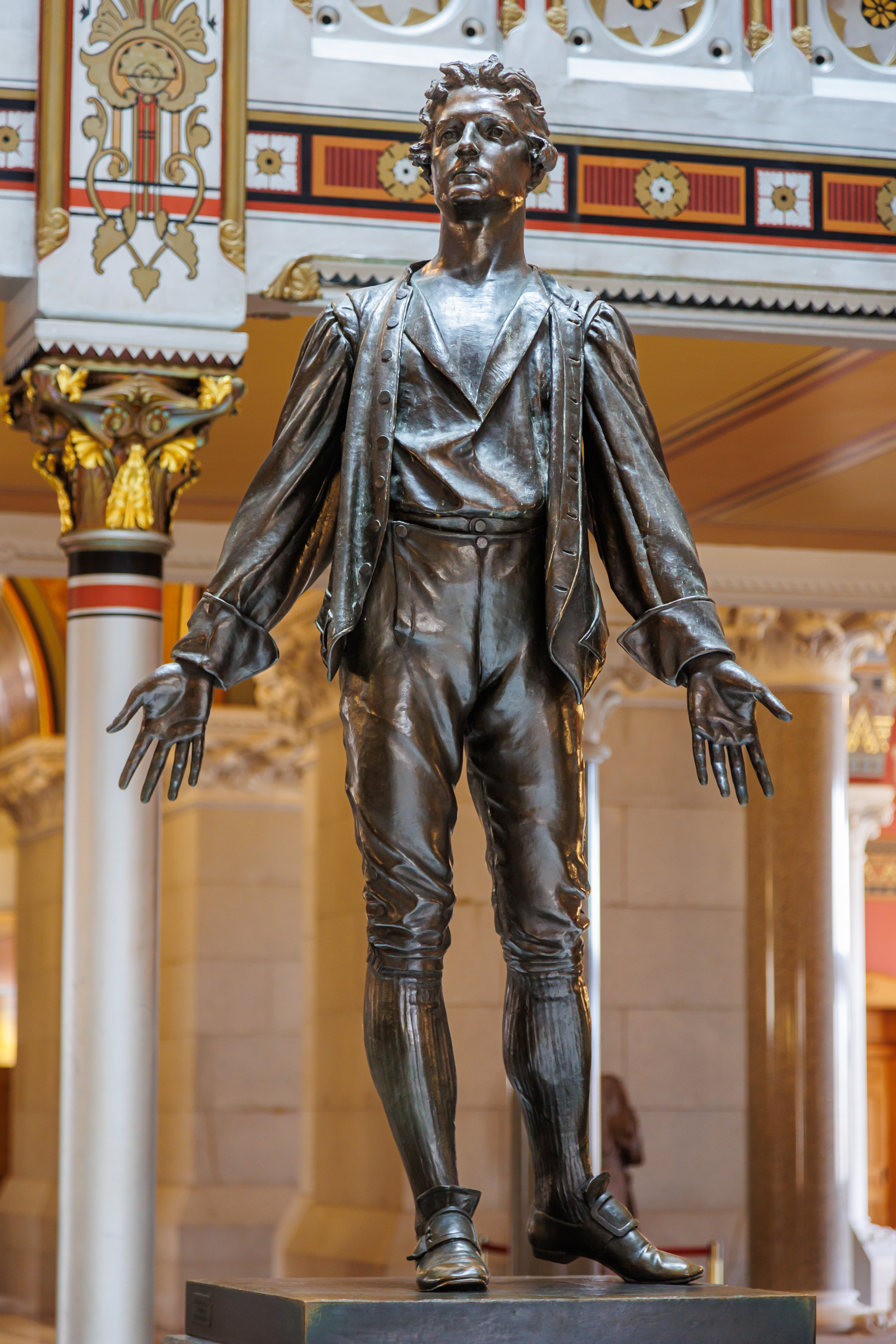
Nathan Hale (1885–86), Connecticut State Capitol, Hartford, Connecticut.

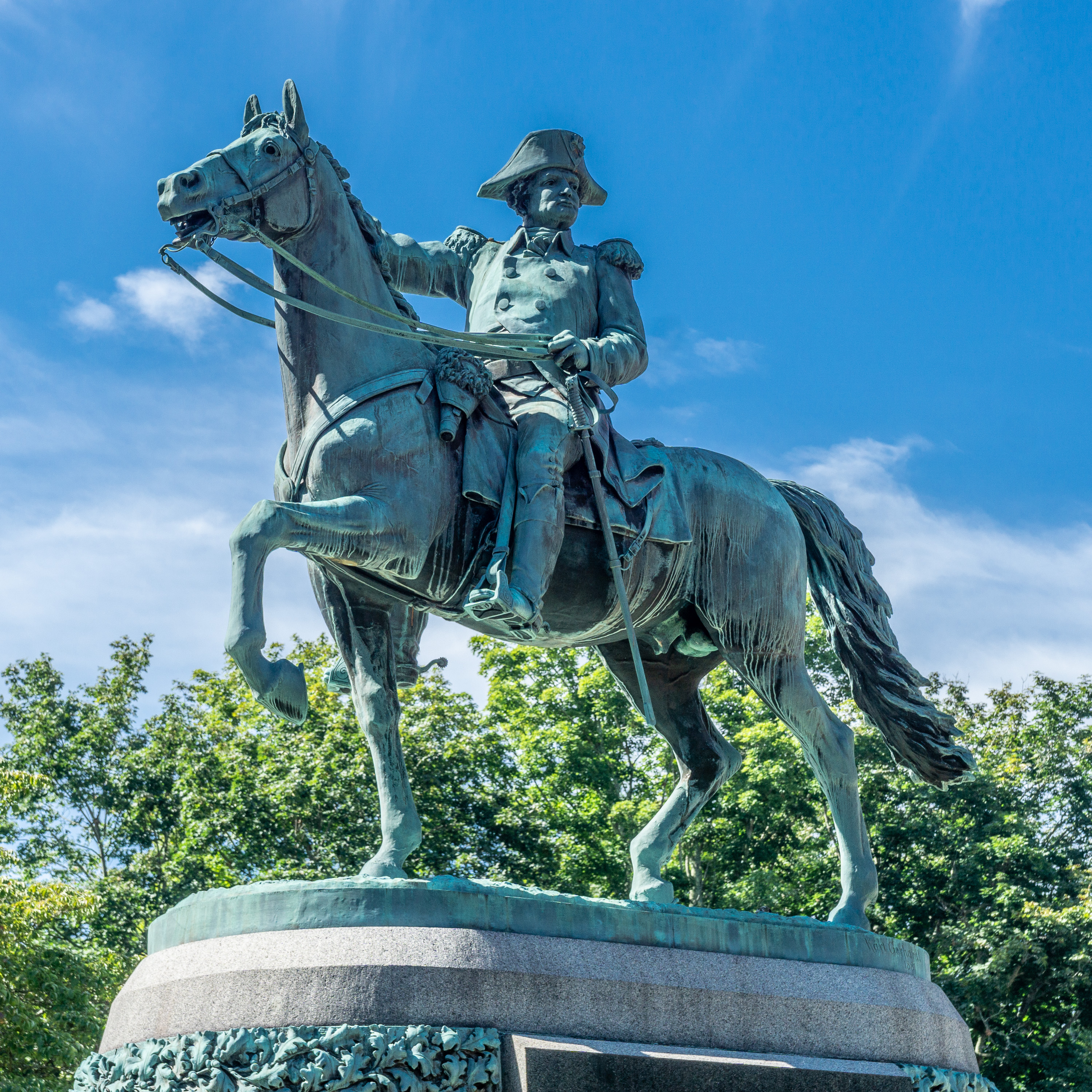
General Israel Putnam (1887–88), Brooklyn, Connecticut.

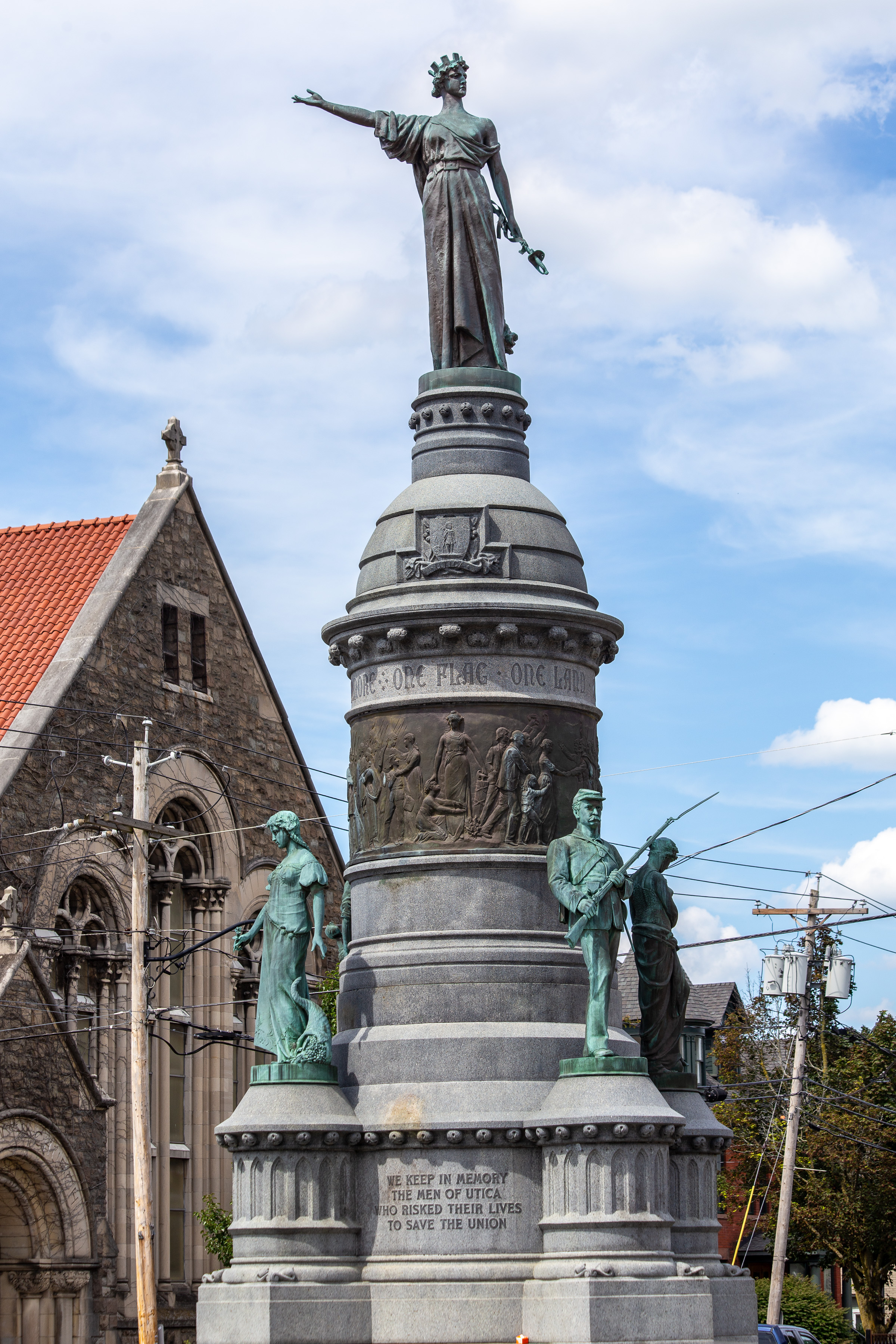
Soldiers' and Sailors' Monument (1891), Utica, New York.

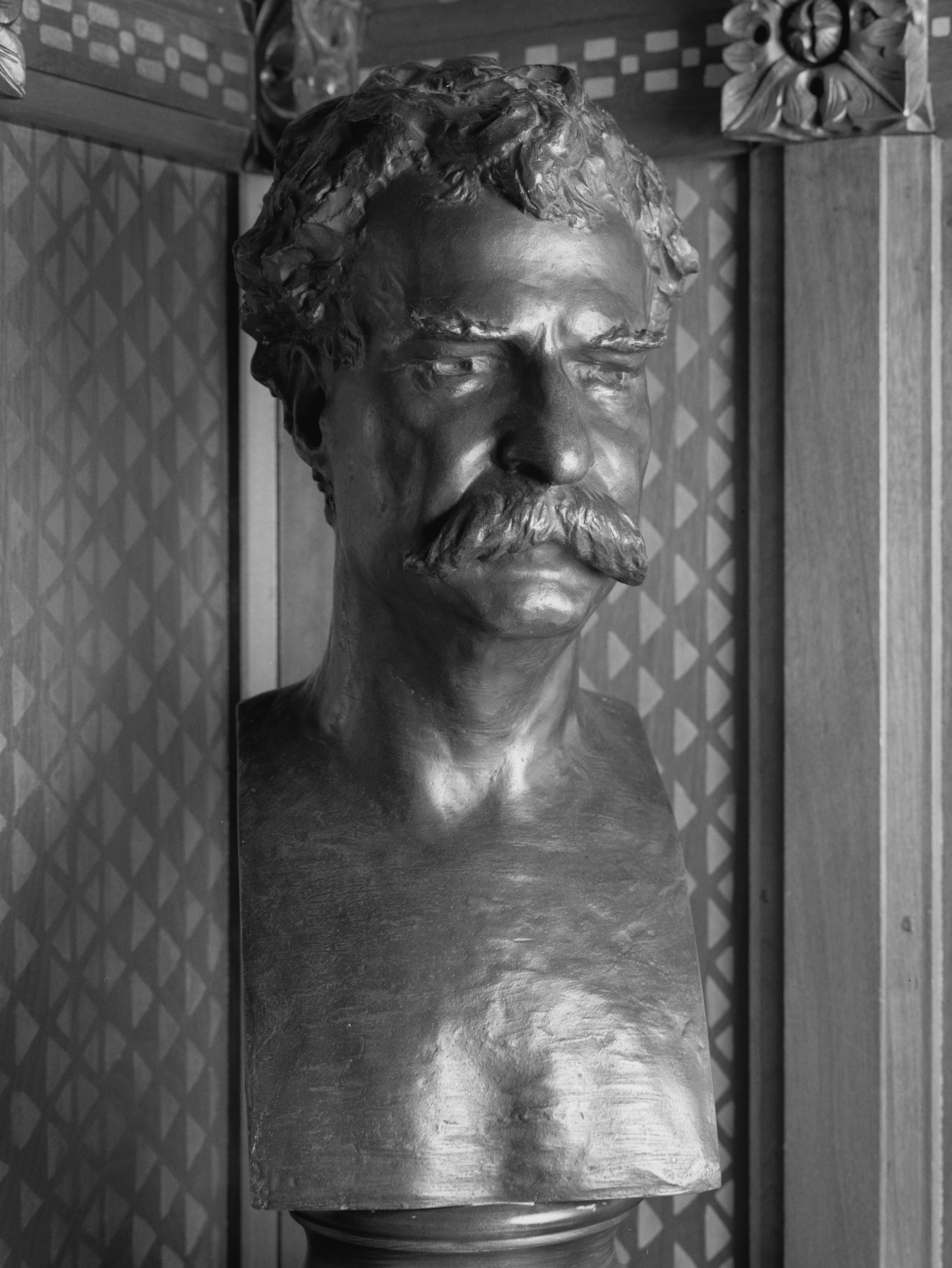
Bust of Samuel Clemens (1884)

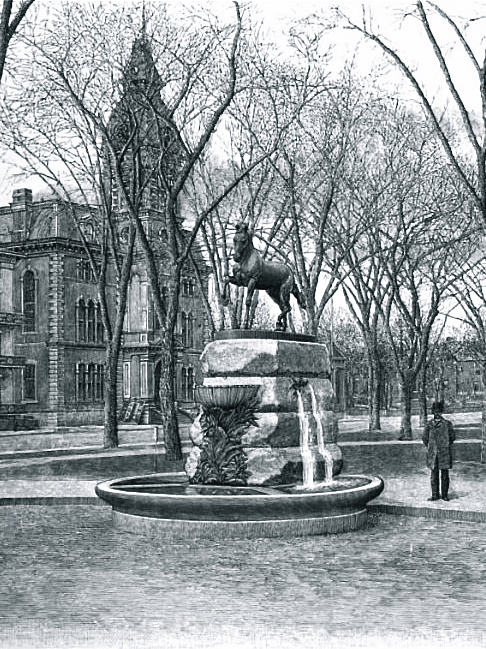
Carrie Welton Fountain (1888), The Green, Waterbury, Connecticut.

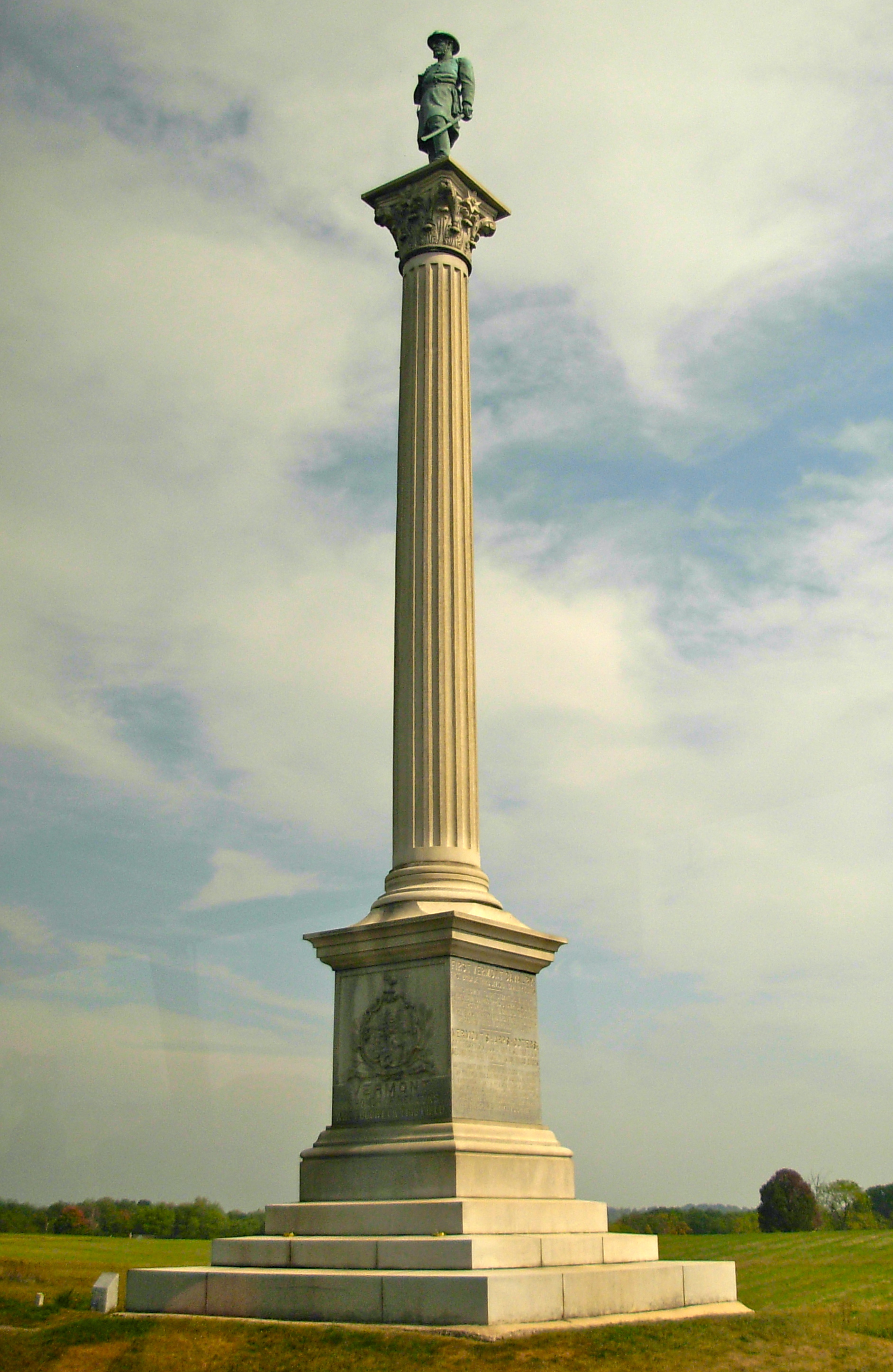
Stannard's Vermont Brigade Monument (1889), Gettysburg, Pennsylvania.

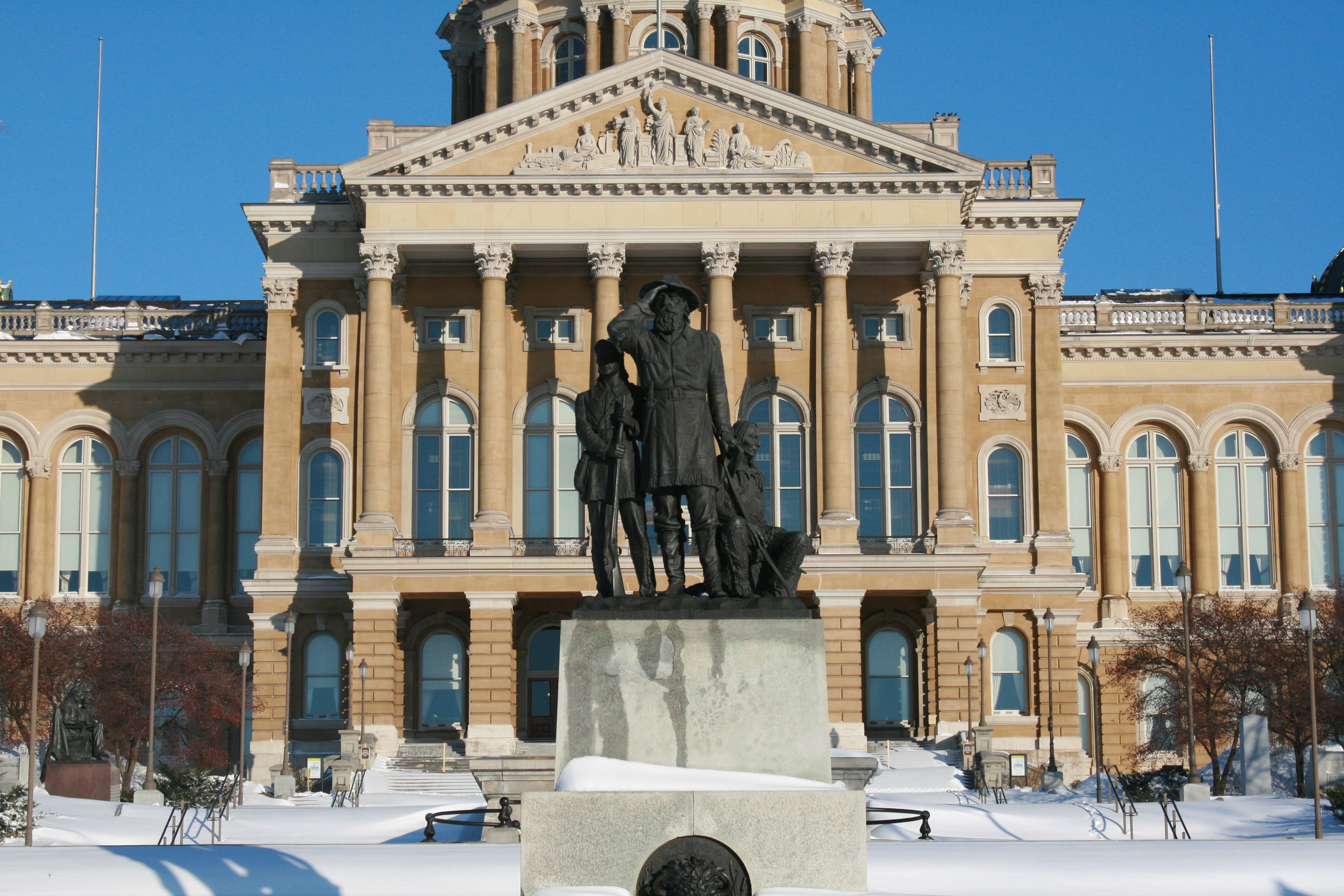
Pioneers of the Territory (1892), Iowa State Capitol, Des Moines, Iowa.

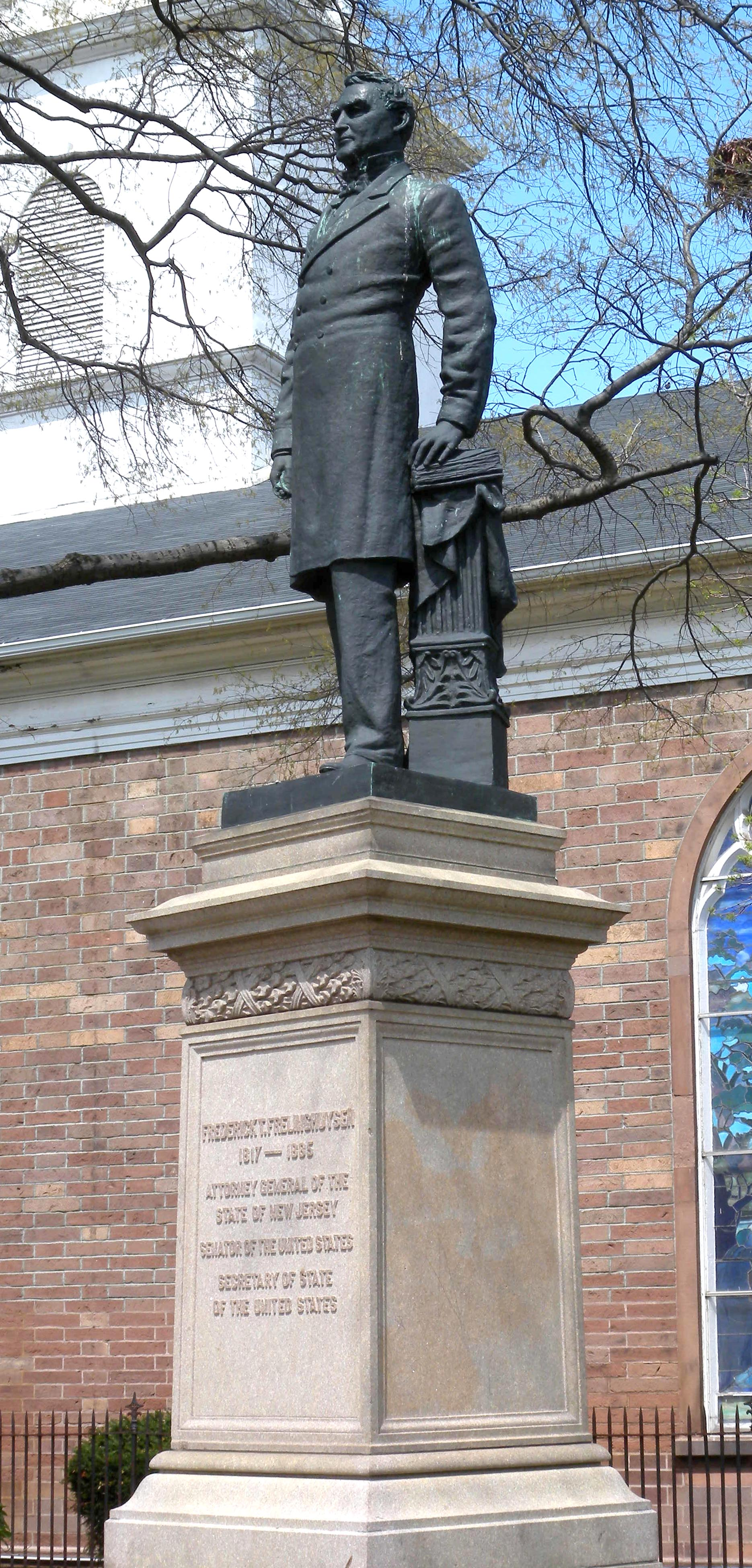
Frederick T. Frelinghuysen (1894–1904), Military Park, Newark, New Jersey.
