= Galgenberg (Lütte) =

Coordinates: 52°11′59″N 12°36′25″E

Geography
- Location: Bad Belzig, Germany

Galgenberg (Lütte) is a forested hill in Bad Belzig, Brandenburg, Germany. It is an important archaeological site which was excavated in 2014 and 2018.
