= Gallow Hill =

Hill in Perthshire, Scotland

Coordinates: 56.560°N 2.992°W

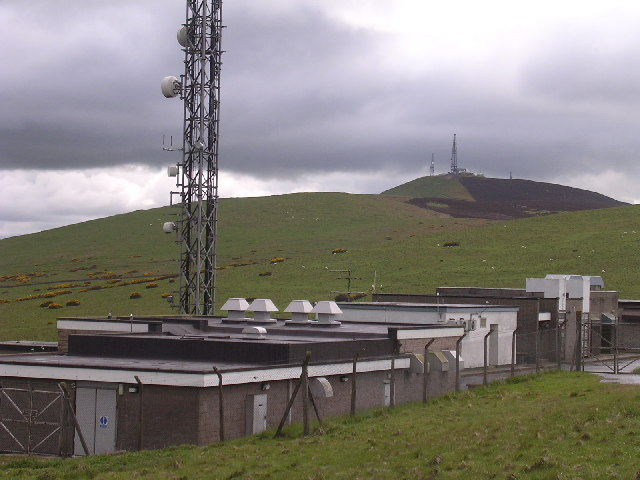
- TV and radio transmitter on Gallow Hill. The masts on the summit of nearby Craigowl Hill to the west are also visible.

Highest point
- Elevation: 378 m (1,240 ft)
- Prominence: 37 m (121 ft)

Geography
- Location: Angus, Scotland
- Parent range: Sidlaw Hills
- Topo map: OS Landranger 54

Climbing
- Easiest route: Dirt Path

Gallow Hill is one of the hills of the Sidlaw range in South East Perthshire, Scotland. At 378 metres (1,240 ft). Gallow Hill is located near Newbigging and is smaller than Craigowl Hill.
