= USS General Putnam =

USS General Putnam is a name used more than once by the U.S. Navy:

- USS General Putnam (1857), a Civil War tugboat and gunboat
- USS General Putnam (SP-2284), a ferry boat acquired under charter by the Navy 6 February 1918
