= Gibbet Hill (Massachusetts) =

Summit in Massachusetts, United States

Coordinates: 42°36′36″N 71°33′33″W

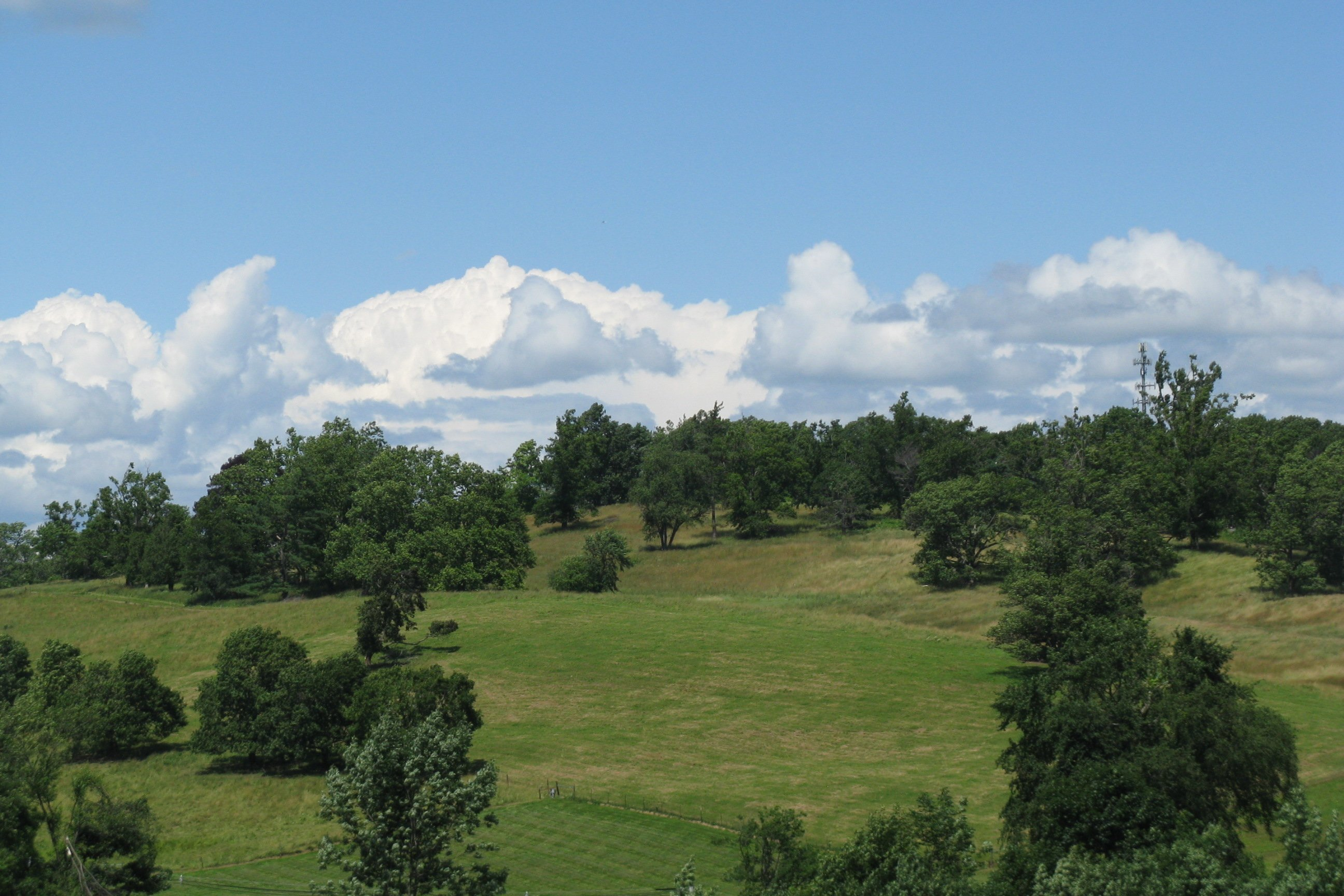
Gibbet Hill

Gibbet Hill is a summit in the U.S. state of Massachusetts. The elevation is 469 feet (143 m). According to tradition, the name recalls an incident when an Indian was gibbeted upon the summit.
