= Galgenberg (Schwarzenberg) =

Coordinates: 50°32′22″N 12°46′32″E

Highest point
- Elevation: 556.6 m (1,826 ft)

Geography
- Location: Saxony, Germany

Galgenberg is a mountain of Saxony, southeastern Germany.
