= Galgenberg (Heilbronn) =

Coordinates: 49°08′51″N 9°15′44″E

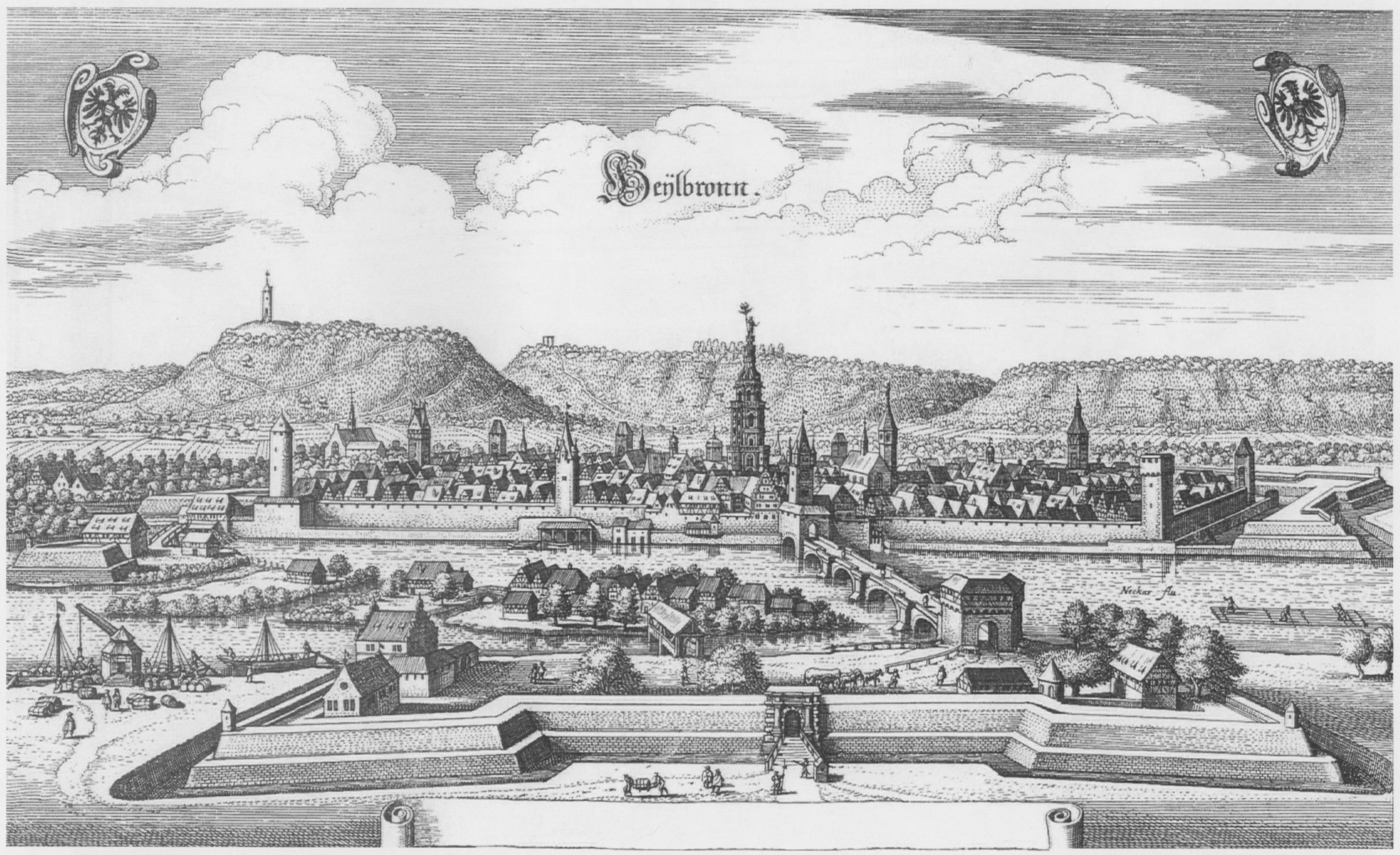
- Galgenberg

Highest point
- Elevation: 312 m (1,024 ft)

Geography
- Location: Baden-Württemberg, Germany

Galgenberg (Heilbronn) is a mountain of Baden-Württemberg, Germany.
