= Bush Hill =

Bush Hill may relate to

- Bush Hill, a cold seep in the northern Gulf of Mexico (Green Canyon block 185) famous for its bushes of tube worms
- Bush Hill, Gauteng, in South Africa
- Bush Hill Park, a neighborhood of the London Borough of Enfield

- Bush Hill Park railway station in the neighborhood
- Bush Hill Rangers F.C., defunct football club from Enfield

- Bush Hill, the estate of Andrew Hamilton in Philadelphia
- Bush Hill Historic District in Brooklyn, Connecticut

== See also ==
- Holly Bush Hill, grassy triangle at the end of Holly Hill, Hampstead, a street in London
- Bush Hall, concert venue in West London
