= Unitarian Meetinghouse =

Historic meetinghouse in Connecticut, United States

- U.S. National Register of Historic Places
- U.S. Historic district – Contributing property
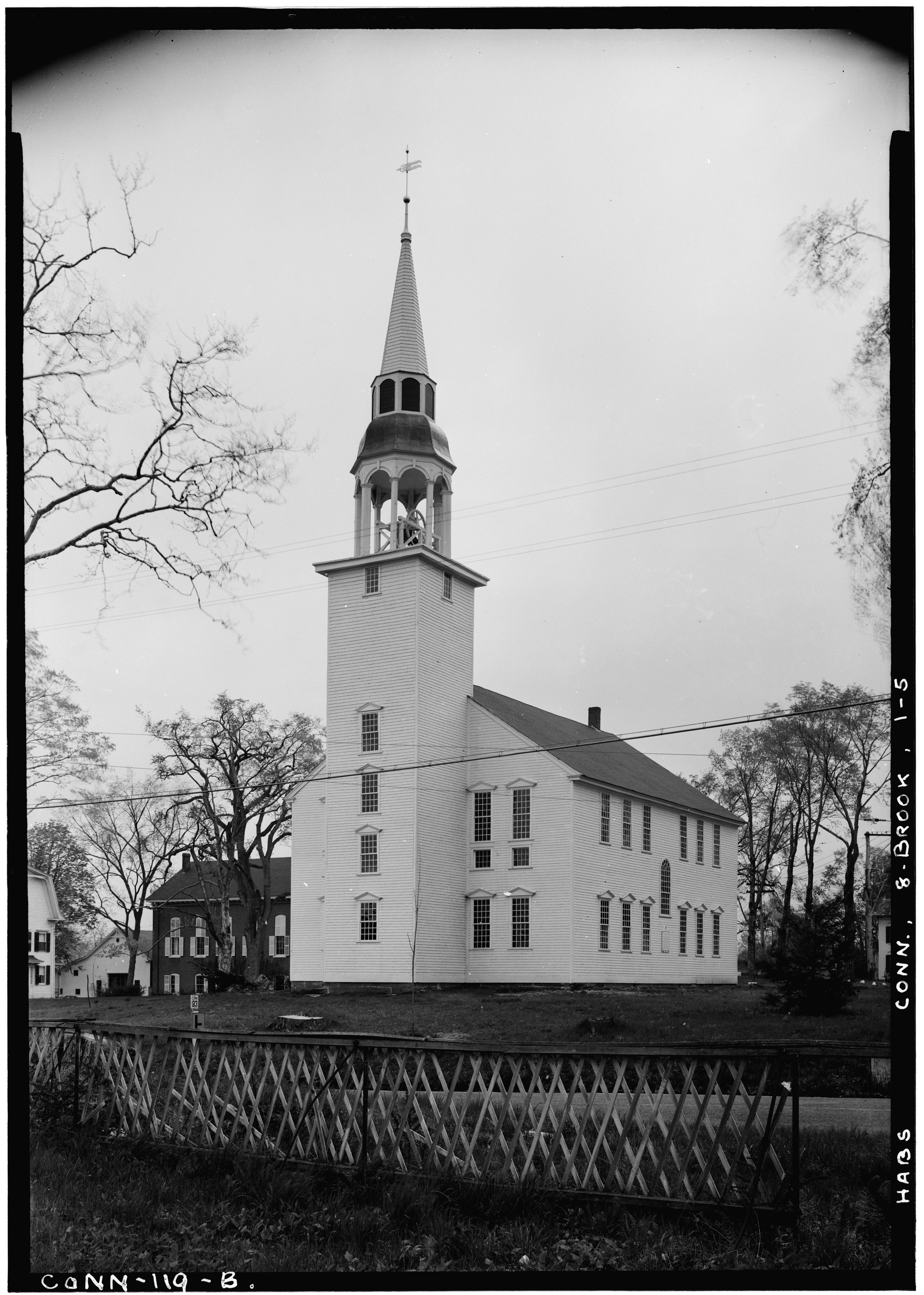
- Meetinghouse in 1940

- Location within Connecticut Location within the United States
- Location: 7 Hartford Road, Brooklyn, Connecticut
- Coordinates: 41°47′16″N 71°57′1″W
- Area: 2 acres (0.81 ha)
- Built: 1771
- Architect: Tyler, Daniel; Et al.
- Architectural style: Georgian; Greek Revival
- Part of: Brooklyn Green Historic District (ID82004401)
- NRHP reference No.: 72001335

Significant dates
- Added to NRHP: November 9, 1972
- Designated CP: September 23, 1982

The Unitarian Meetinghouse is a historic church at the junction of Connecticut Routes 169 and 6 in the village center of Brooklyn, Connecticut. Built in 1771, it is one of a small number of pre-Revolutionary church buildings in the state, and distinctive for having a sufficiently complete documentary record to support a complete restoration. It retains a configuration distinctive of that period, with its main entrance on the long side of the building, and the pulpit opposite. The bell tower with steeple is located at one of the short ends, suggestive of the 19th century change to place the entrance there as well. The building was listed on the National Register of Historic Places in 1972.

When Brooklyn was settled in the early 18th century, its territory was divided between Pomfret and Canterbury. Its religious congregation was organized in 1731, and was originally called the Mortlake Society. Its first meeting house, built in 1734, was known as the Second Church in Pomfret. The present church was built in 1771-74; the town of Brooklyn was incorporated in 1786. Its construction, first proposed in 1763, was opposed for many years by local Anglicans, resulting in the construction of Trinity Church. In the early 19th century, the congregation was split between Trinitarians and Unitarians, with the latter ultimately retaining control of this building. The building was restyled in 1845, relocating the entrance to a new tower on the side, building a full second floor at the gallery level, and replacing the box pews and pulpit. All of the interior changes were reversed in the late 20th century, restoring it to its original form. The tower, whose steeple was replaced after the New England Hurricane of 1938, was retained.

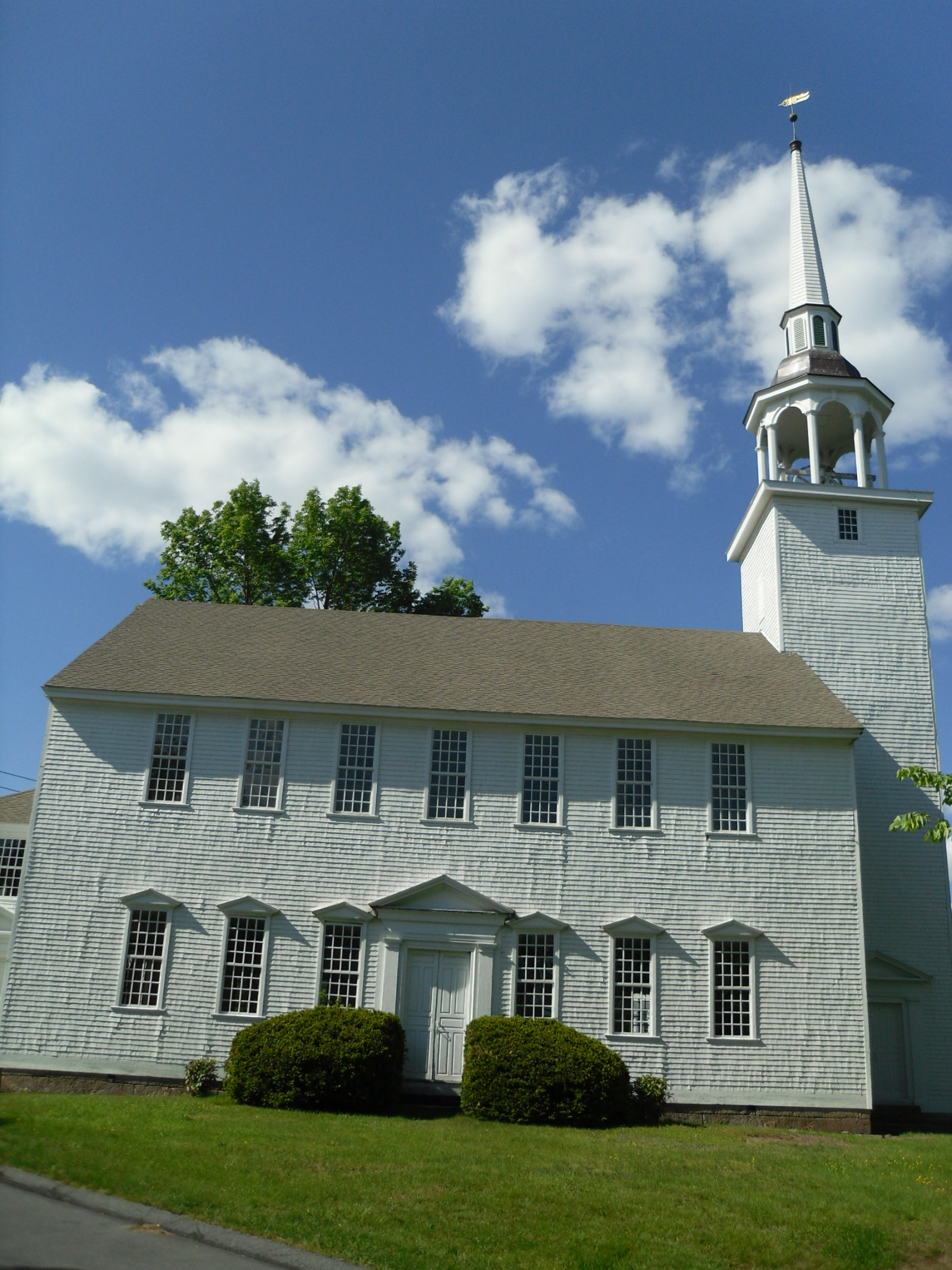
The meetinghouse in 2010.

The building is owned and maintained by the Unitarian Universalist Society in Brooklyn, CT. The UUSB are the direct successors of the first Unitarian congregation in Connecticut. Its first Unitarian minister, Rev. Samuel May, was a noted peace activist, education reformer, temperance crusader, supporter of women's rights, and one of the principal supporters of Prudence Crandall, the official female hero of the state of Connecticut. In 1871 the UUSB ordained the Rev. Celia Burleigh, the first female Unitarian minister and one of the first regularly ordained female ministers in any denomination.

== See also ==
- National Register of Historic Places listings in Windham County, Connecticut
