= William Woodbridge (Connecticut physician) =

American politician (1819–1888)

- Born: August 8, 1819; Hartford, Connecticut
- Died: August 6, 1888 (aged 68); Brooklyn, Connecticut
- Education: Yale Medical School
- Years active: 1844–1888
- Spouse(s): Mary Ann Bidwell (m. 1847; died 1872) Abby B. Ensworth (m. 1878–1888)
- Medical career
- Profession: Physician

William Woodbridge (August 8, 1819 – August 6, 1888) was an American medical doctor and state legislator.

Woodbridge, fourth child of James R and Mary (Bull) Woodbridge, of Hartford, Connecticut, was born in Hartford, August 8, 1819.

He graduated from Yale College in 1840 and received his medical degree from Yale Medical School in 1844, and settling for practice in Manchester, Connecticut, whence he removed two or three years later to Brooklyn, Connecticut, where he continued until his death, on August 6, 1888, at the age of 69 years. During his long career in Brooklyn as a physician he was a leader in religious and civil affairs. He represented the town in the Connecticut State Legislature in 1869. He married, April 26, 1847, Mary Ann Bidwell, who died July 6, 1872, leaving two children. He next married, Sept 13, 1878, Abby B. Ensworth, of Canterbury, Connecticut, who survived him.
