= Peter Harrison (architect) =

English-born architect (1716–1775)

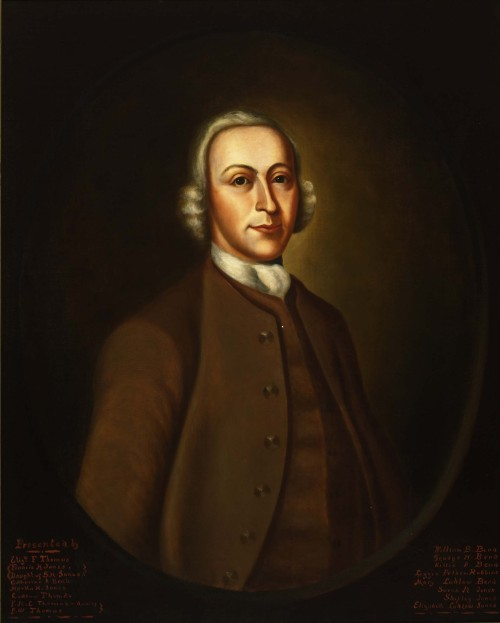
- Mid-nineteenth-century portrait of Harrison done from a Nathaniel Smibert original from 1756
- Born: 14 June 1716; Grimston, York, Yorkshire, England
- Died: 30 April 1775 (aged 58); New Haven, Connecticut Colony, Colonial America
- Occupation: Architect
- Buildings: The Redwood Library, Touro Synagogue, King's Chapel (1749) in Boston, Massachusetts, Christ Church, Cambridge

Peter Harrison (14 June 1716 – 30 April 1775) was an English-born architect who emigrated to New England and is credited with introducing the Palladian architectural movement to the Thirteen Colonies.

== Early life and education ==
Born in 1716 in Grimston, York, England, to Thomas H. Harrison and Elizabeth Denison, Harrison immigrated to the colony of Rhode Island in 1740 with his surveyor brother, Joseph. They initially established themselves as merchants and captains of their own trading vessels.

Having gained a stake, between 1743 and 1745, Harrison returned to England to receive formal training as an architect. He studied under the direction of an unknown English lord, among those who trained architects through private studio-schools. They used architectural pattern books, taught drafting and colouring skills, and conducted grand tours of Italy and Greece, where students could see classical structures firsthand. They were taught to become expert draftsmen. These private studio-schools drew from the works of such masters such as the 16th-century Italian Palladio and the classical Roman Vitruvius.

== Career ==
Through his travels and education in Europe, Harrison acquired a substantial library of books related to classically inspired designs, and also had an opportunity to see the latest designs that were produced by architects of the Palladian movement. When he returned to New England, where he first settled in Newport, Rhode Island, he brought Palladianism with him. He designed notable buildings in Rhode Island and Massachusetts, and influenced many more.

Harrison is now credited as the first professionally trained architect in America in the Palladian style. His known works in the British-American colonies are considered to be of the highest quality and the finest examples of Palladianism in his time.

=== Works ===
More than 400 buildings in Europe, North and South America, Africa, and Asia have been attributed to Harrison, though only a few are supported with documentary evidence. Those listed here are his documented projects as identified by historian John Fitzhugh Millar in 2014.

- Steeple, Christ Church, Philadelphia, PA (1745)
- Fort George I, Goat Island, Newport, RI (1745, demolished)
- Leamington Farm, Newport, RI (1747, altered)
- Matthew Cozzens House, Middletown, RI (1748, demolished 1949)
- Redwood Library, Newport, RI (1748–49)
- Beavertail Lighthouse I, Jamestown, RI, (1749, burned)
- King's Chapel, Boston, MA (1749)
- John Still Winthrop House, New London, CT (1754, demolished)
- Beavertail Lighthouse II, Jamestown, RI, (1755, destroyed)
- Touro Synagogue, Newport, RI (1759)
- Christ Church, Cambridge MA (1759–60)
- Saint John’s Freemasons Hall, Newport, RI (1759)
- Steeple and enlargement, Trinity Church, Newport, RI (1762)
- Old Brick Market, Newport, RI (1762–72)
- Johnson Hall, Johnstown, NY (1763)
- Saint Paul’s Chapel, New York, NY (1766, recent identification)
- Old Dartmouth Hall, Dartmouth College, Hanover, NH (1769, burned 1904, reconstructed)
- Governor John Wentworth County House, Wolfeborough, NH (1769, demolished)
- Trinity Church, Brooklyn, CT (1771)

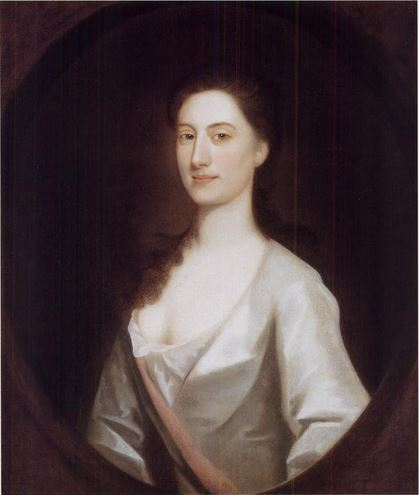
Elizabeth Pelham Harrison, Peter Harrison's wife, by Joseph Blackburn

== Later life ==
Harrison married Elizabeth Pelham on 6 June 1746, and they had a child that the winter, prior to settling in New Haven, Connecticut Colony. They had a second child, daughter Hermione, in September 1746. In 1759, the family was living in Newport, Rhode Island.

He was dedicated to Toryism and English culture. He died of a stroke at his home in New Haven in 1775. He is buried in an unmarked grave at Trinity Church on the Green, on New Haven Green. His widow survived him by nine years; her place of burial is not known.

Soon after his death, aged 58, in 1775, his home was attacked by a mob of revolutionaries. They burned his library and all of his original drawings. This act of political violence destroyed the collection of one of the most erudite architects of the colonial period. It prevented the preparation of a catalogue of his designs for posterity.

== Gallery ==
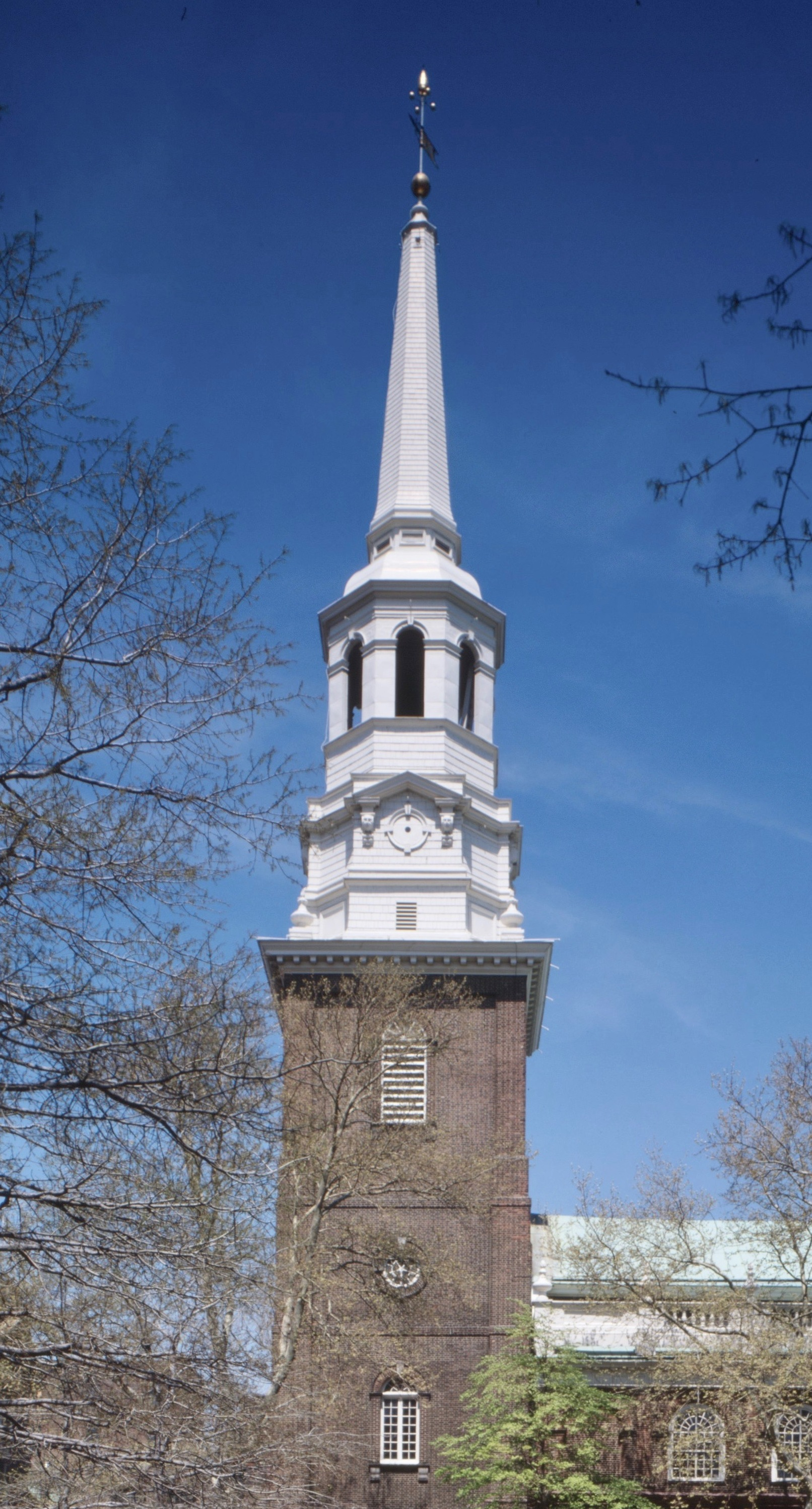
Steeple, Christ Church (1745), Philadelphia

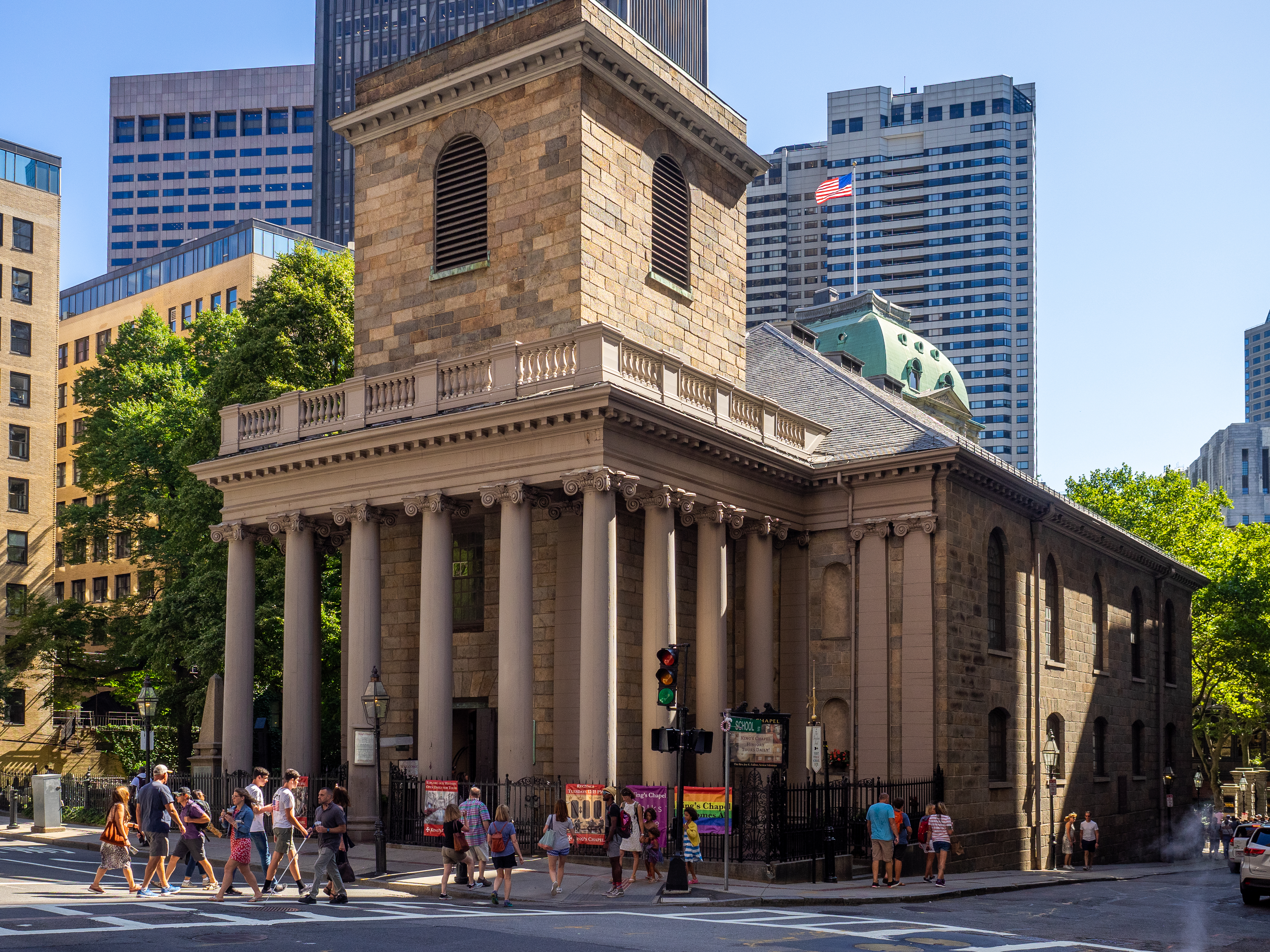
King's Chapel (1749), Boston

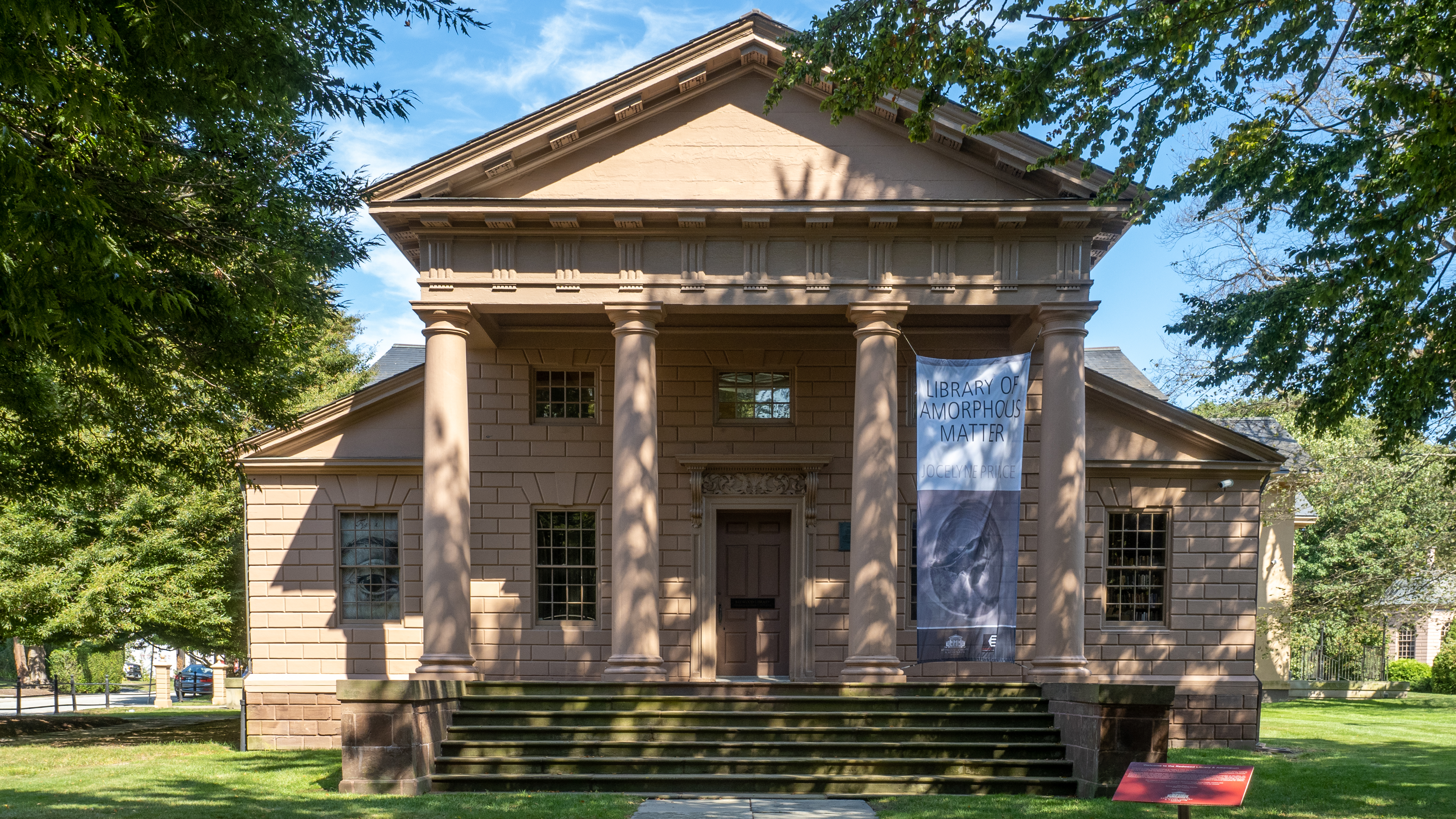
Redwood Library and Athenaeum (1750), Newport

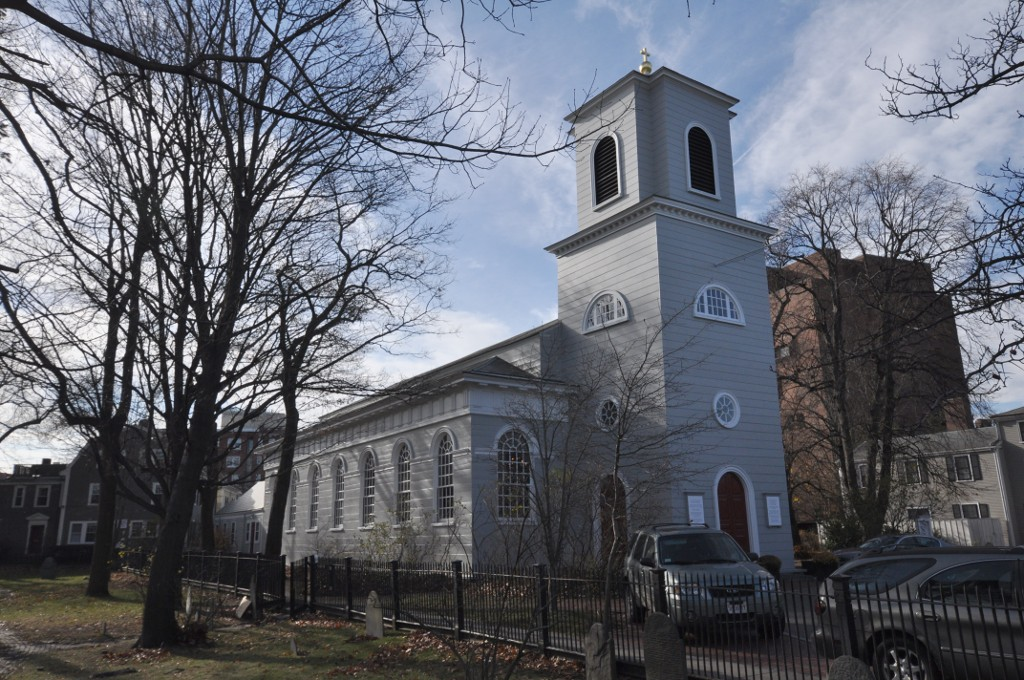
Christ Church (1759), Cambridge

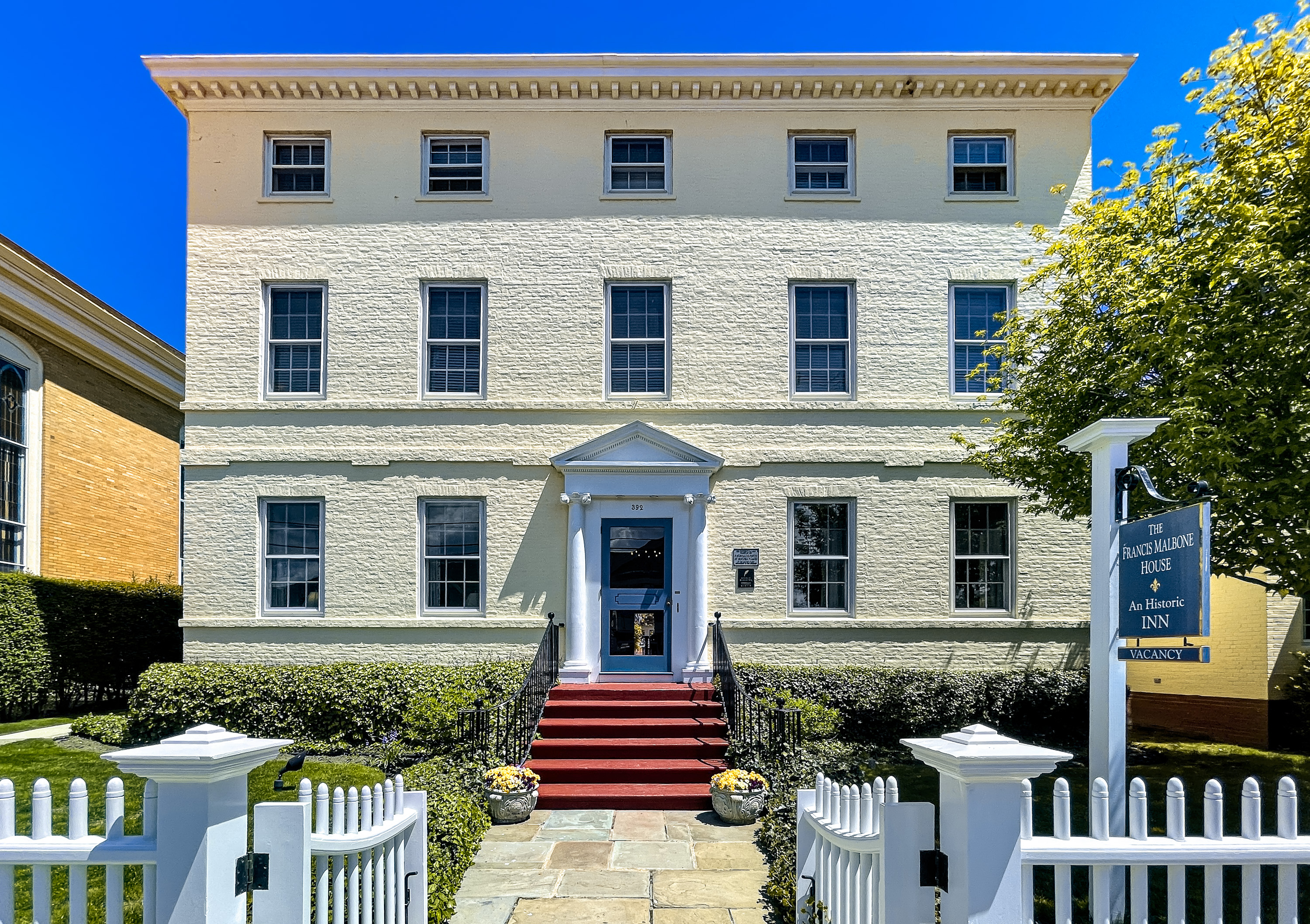
Francis Malbone House (1760), Newport

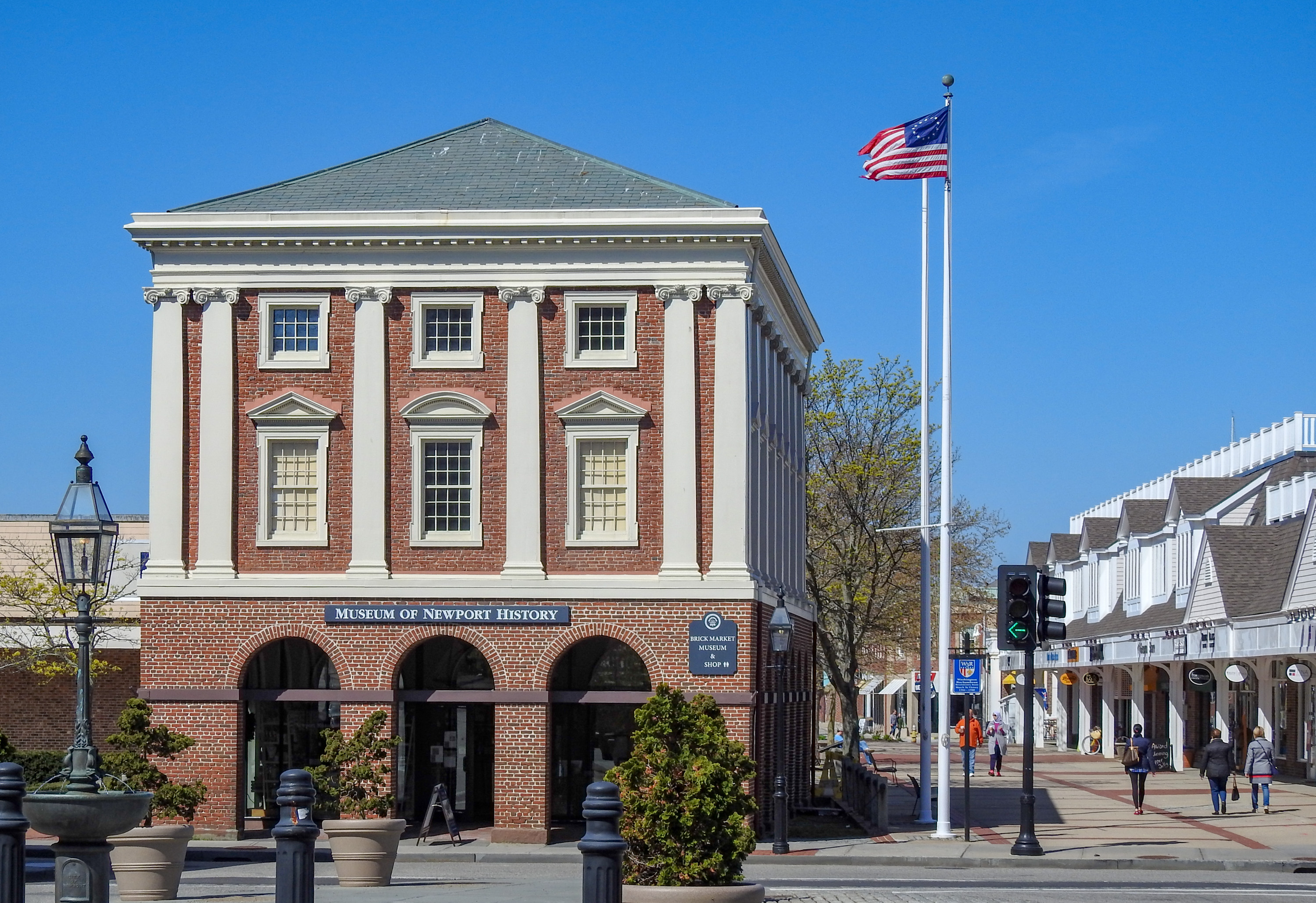
Brick Market Building (1762), Newport

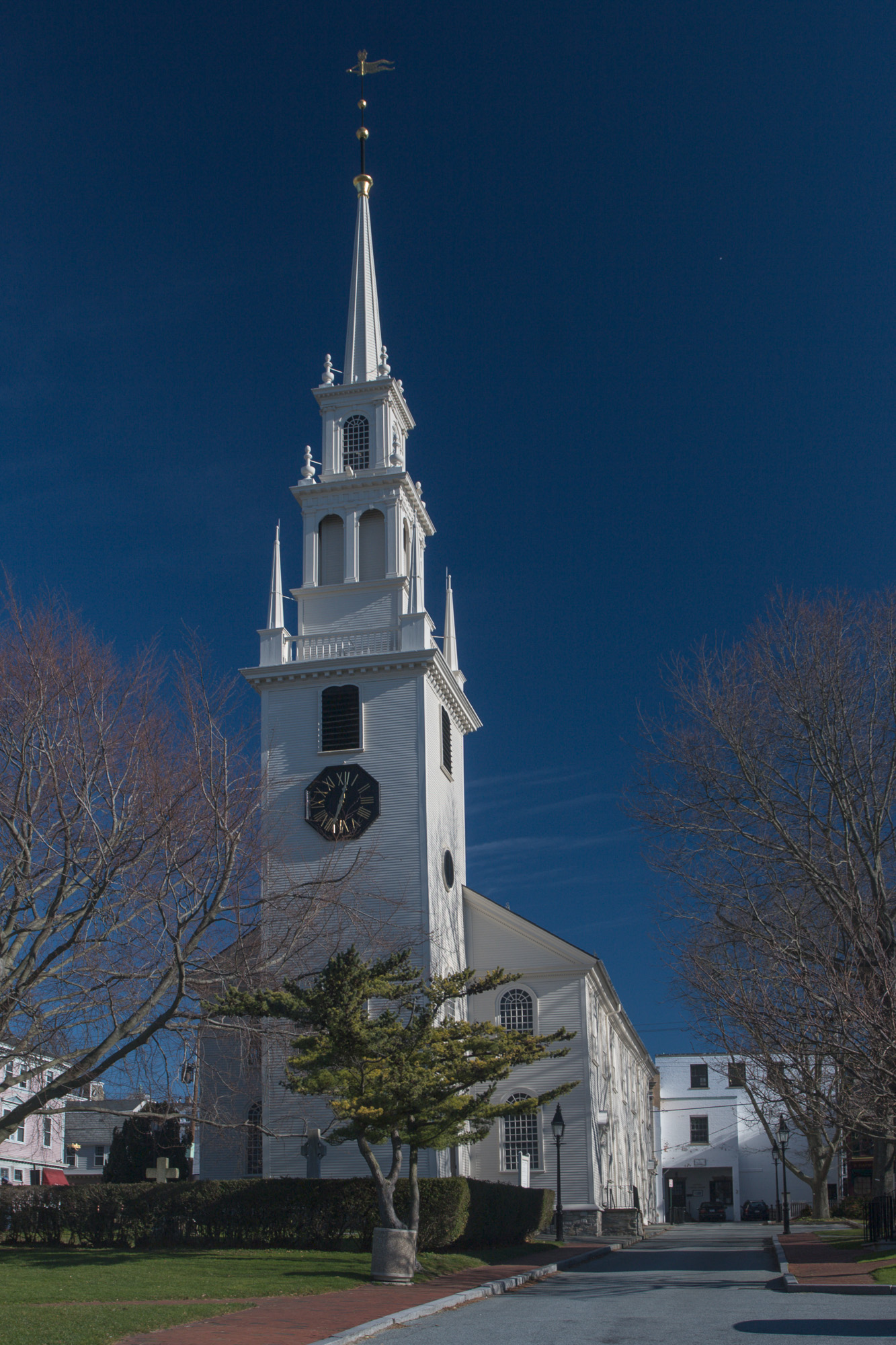
Steeple, Trinity Church, Newport (1762)

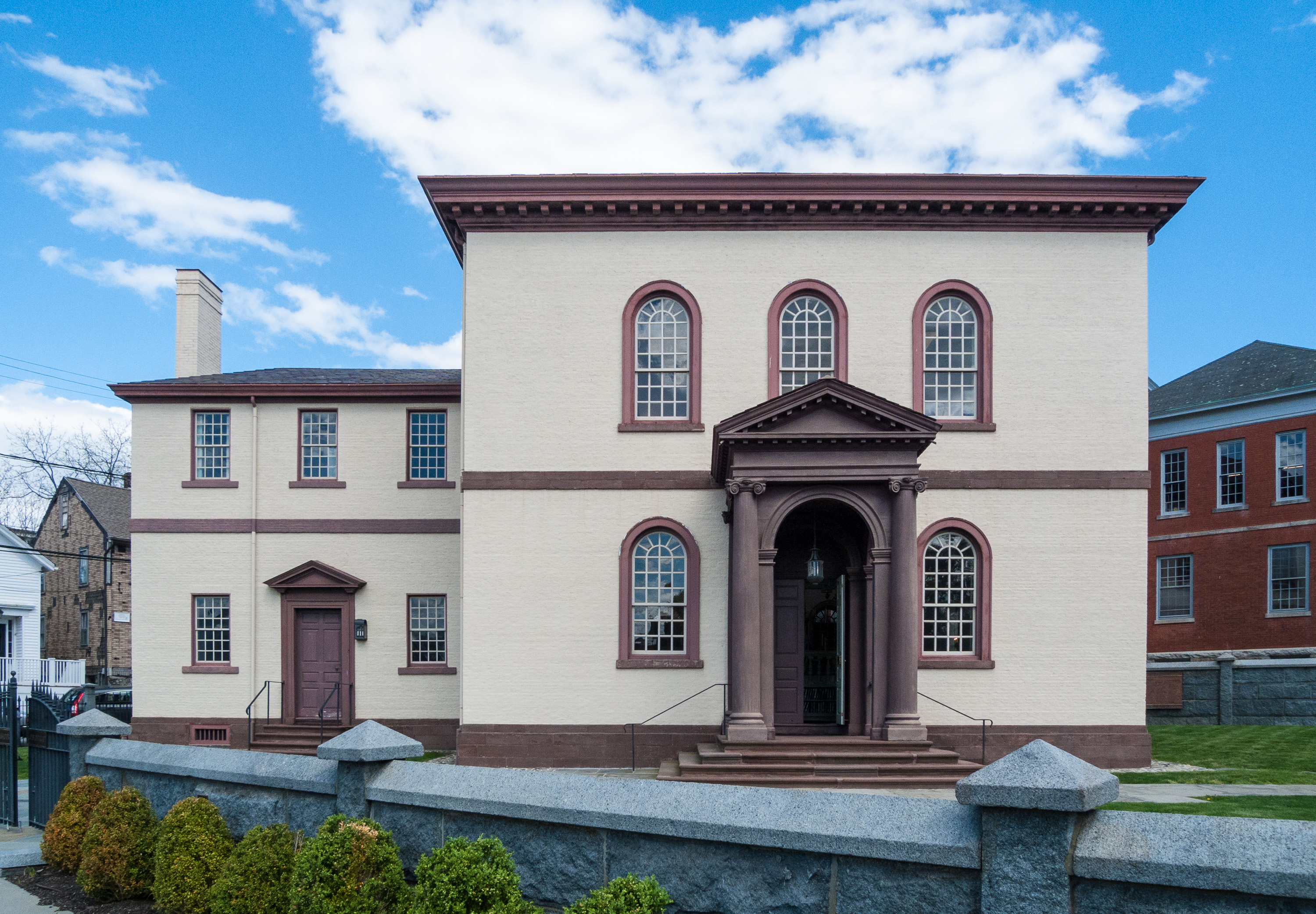
Touro Synagogue (1763), Newport

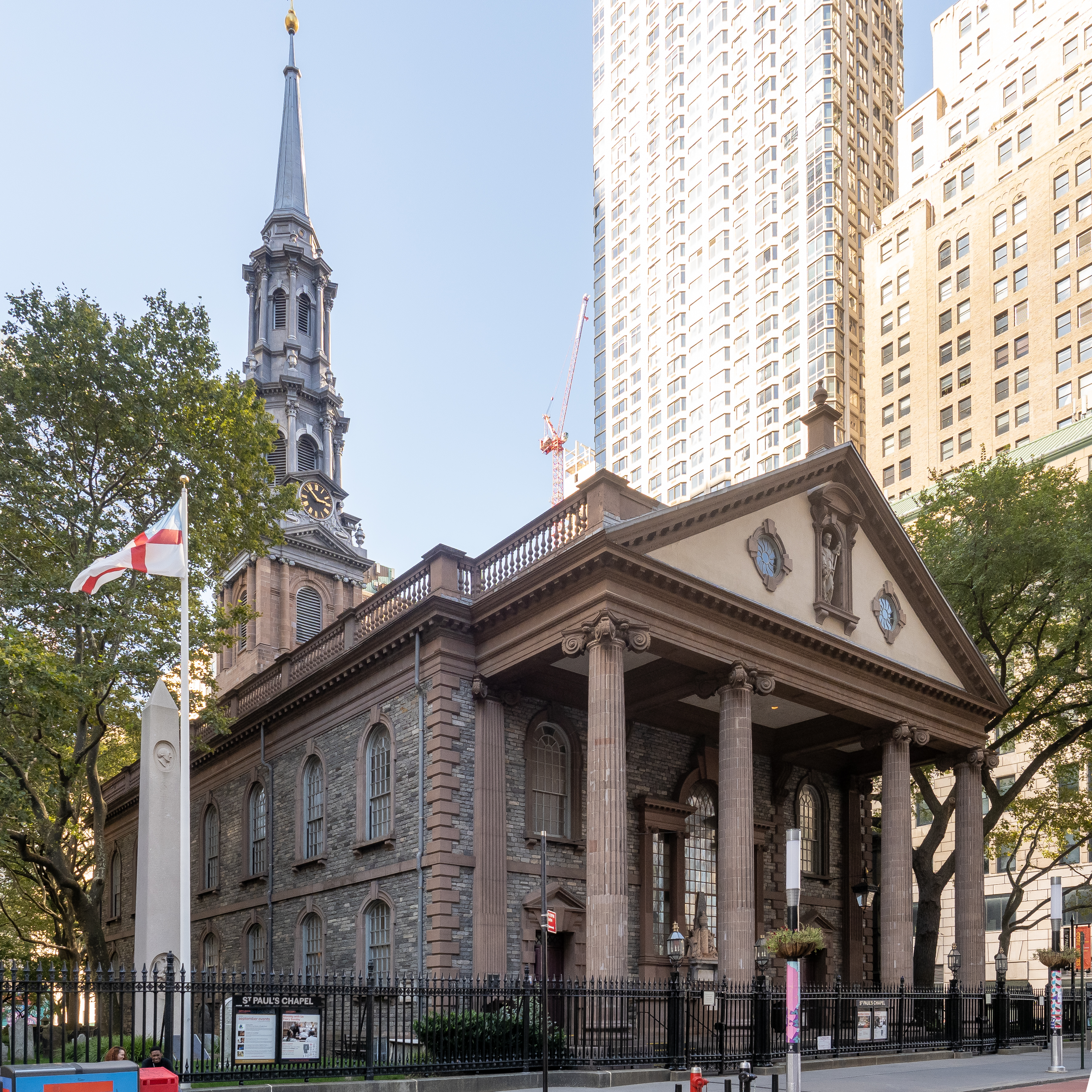
Saint Paul’s Chapel, New York (1766)

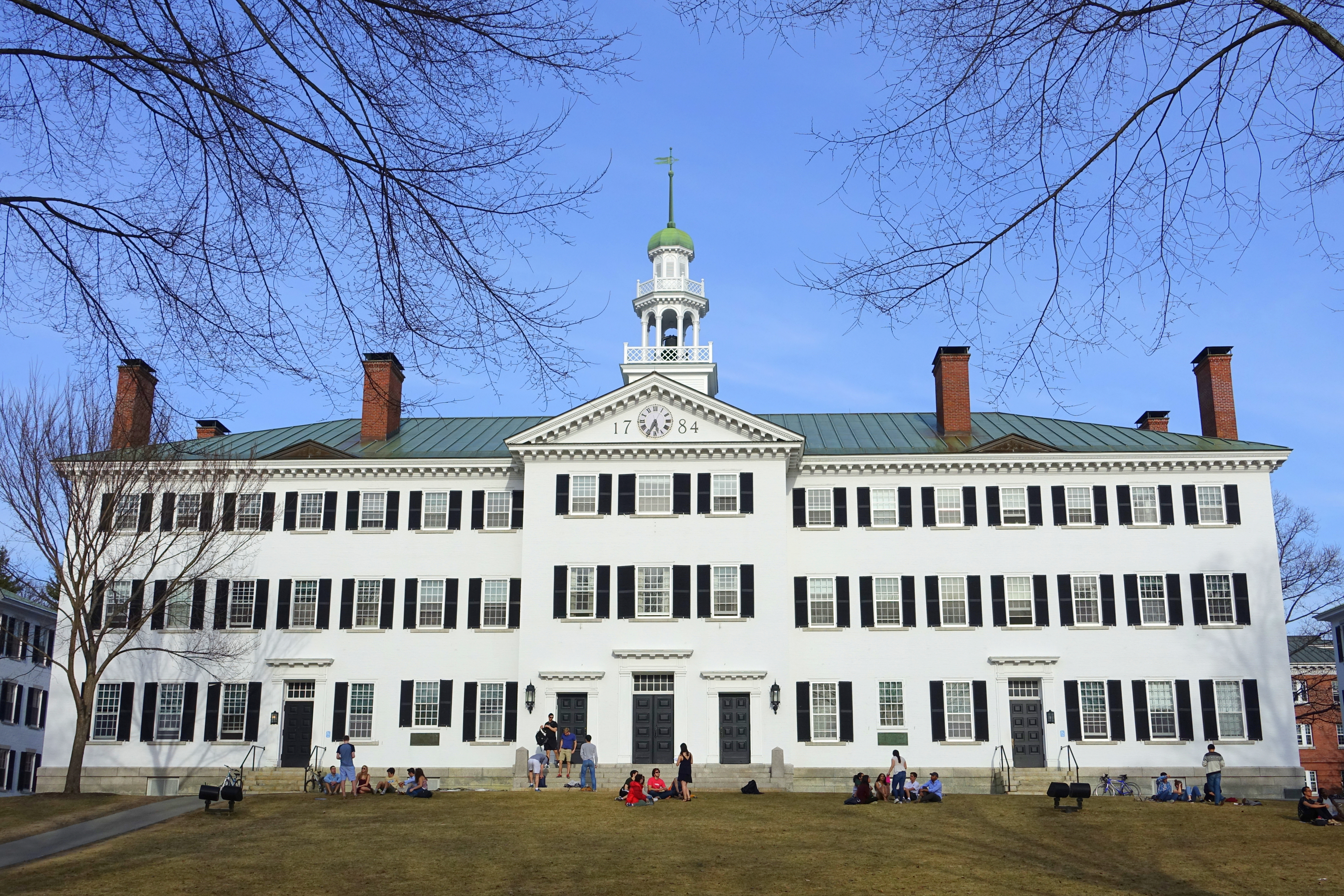
Old Dartmouth Hall, Hanover (1769)

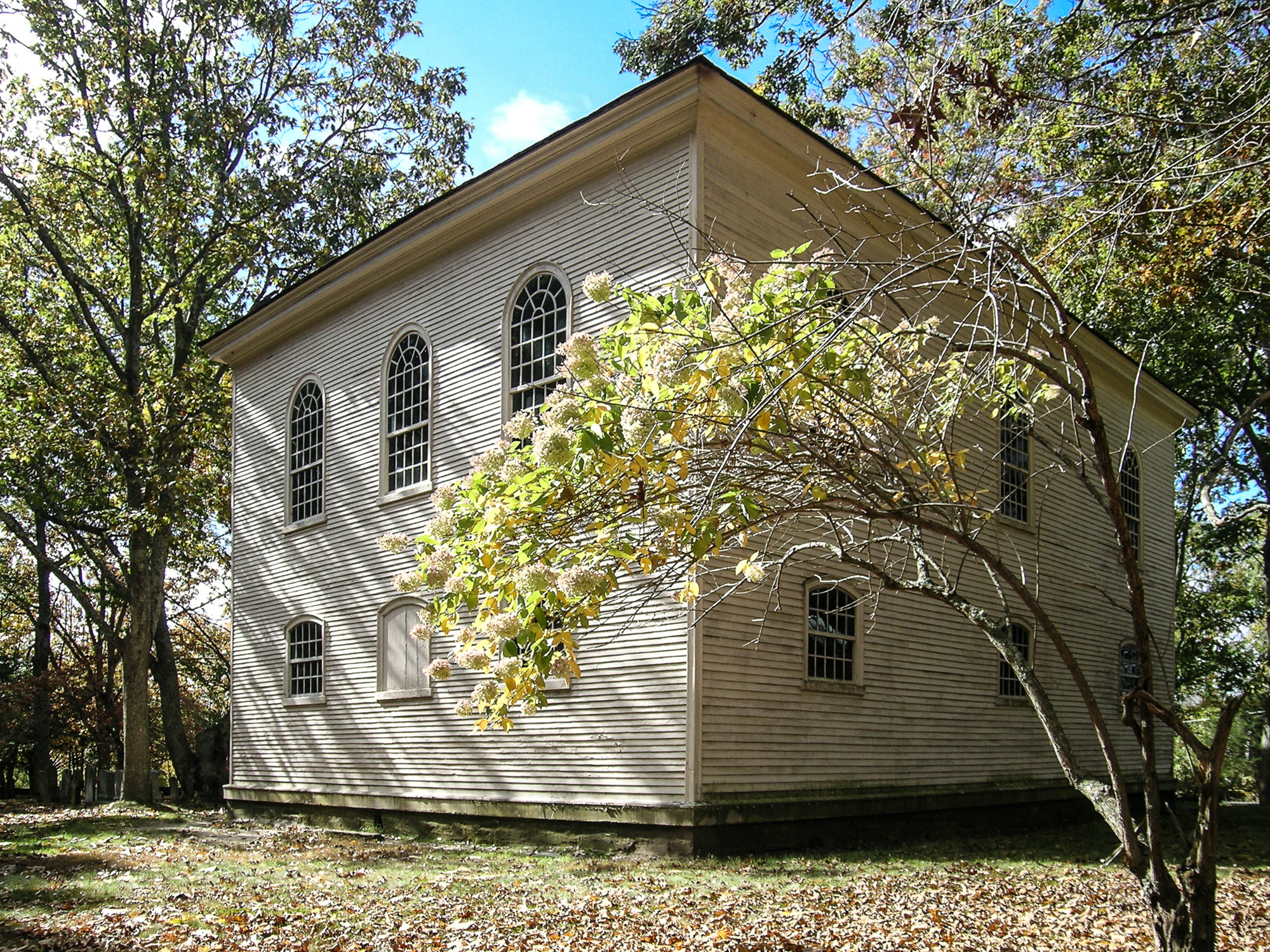
Trinity Church (1771), Brooklyn, CT
