= Israel Putnam House =

Israel Putnam House may refer to these places related to Israel Putnam:

- General Israel Putnam House, his birthplace in Danvers, Massachusetts
- Putnam Cottage in Greenwich, Connecticut, where he had a close escape; owned by the Israel Putnam House Association
- Putnam Farm, his farmstead in Brooklyn, Connecticut
