= East Brooklyn =

East Brooklyn is the name of the following places in the United States.

- East Brooklyn, Connecticut
- East Brooklyn, Illinois
