= Mortlake (disambiguation) =

Mortlake is a district of London

Mortlake may also refer to:

- Mortlake, New South Wales, a suburb of Sydney, Australia
- Mortlake, Victoria, a small town in the Western District of Victoria, Australia
- Mortlake, Connecticut, a historical place name in the United States

== See also ==
- Mortlach (disambiguation)
