= Trinity Church (Brooklyn, Connecticut) =

Historic church in Connecticut, United States

- Old Trinity Church
- U.S. National Register of Historic Places
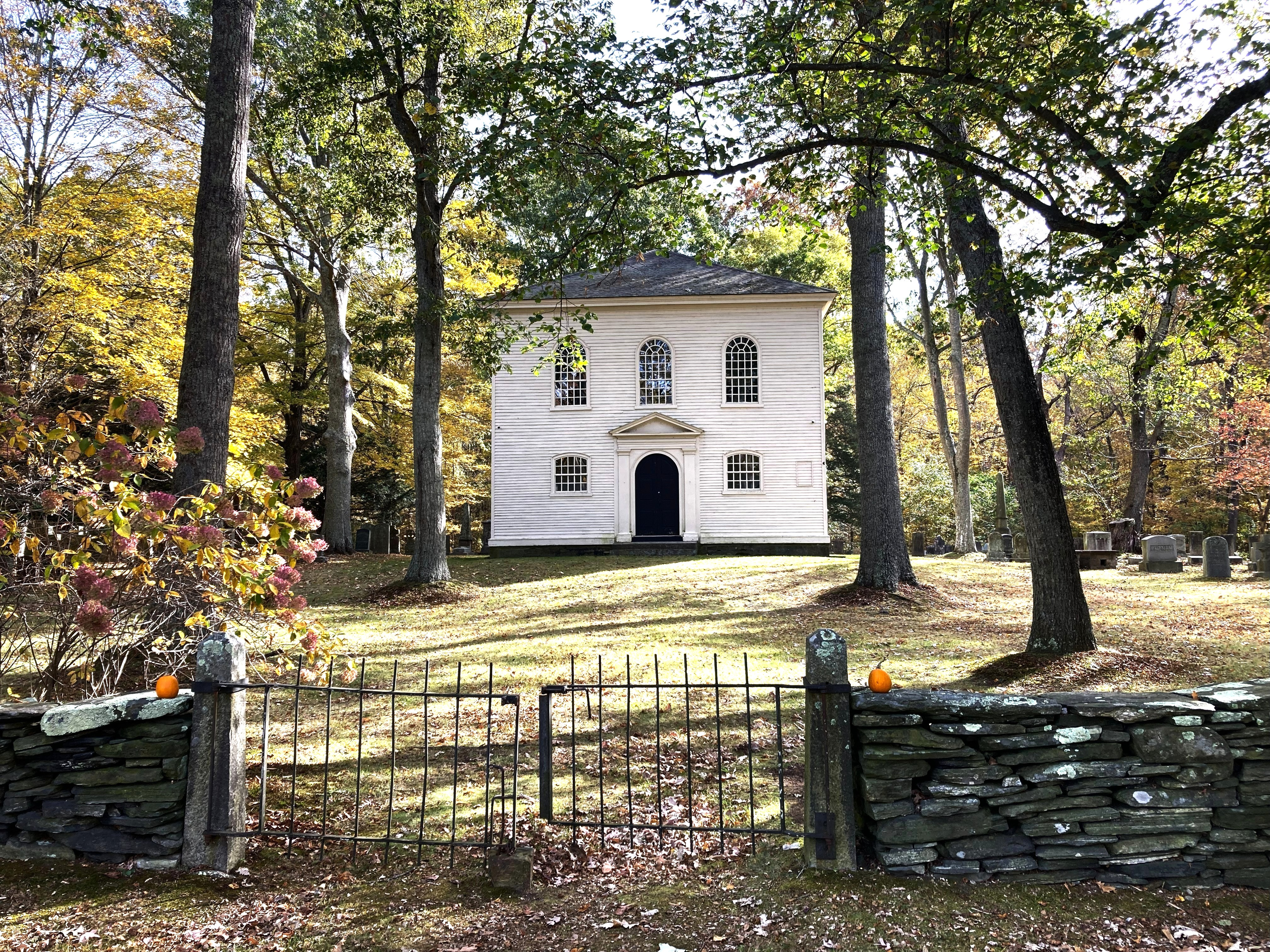

- Location within Connecticut Location within the United States
- Location: Church Street, Brooklyn, Connecticut
- Coordinates: 41°48′0.5466″N 71°55′26.976″W
- Area: 2 acres (0.81 ha)
- Built: 1771
- Architectural style: Georgian
- NRHP reference No.: 70000703
- Added to NRHP: October 5, 1970

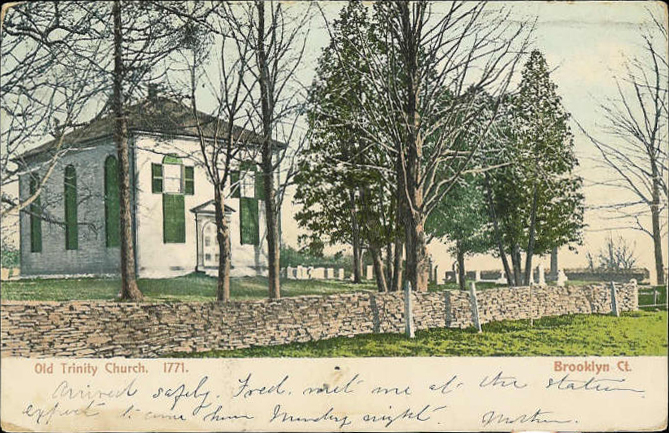
Old Trinity Church in 1907 postcard

Trinity Church is a historic church in Brooklyn, Connecticut. Completed in 1771 and little altered since, it is the oldest Episcopal church in the state. Its congregation now meets mainly in a newer church at 7 Providence Street in Brooklyn Center, but still uses this building for special events. The building was added to National Register of Historic Places in October 1970.

== Description and history ==
Trinity Church is located about 3 miles (4.8 km) east of the center of Brooklyn, on the east side of Church Street near its junction with Brown Road. It is a 2 1/2-story wood-frame structure, with hip roof and clapboarded exterior. The siding is largely original, held in place by hand-cut nails. Ground-floor windows are set in segmented-arch openings, while the second-story windows are taller, and set in round-arch openings. The main facade is three bays wide, with a round-arch opening framed by pilasters and a fully pedimented gable. The interior has its original box pews, whose doors are mounted on wrought iron hinges. It also has the original pulpit and reading desk.

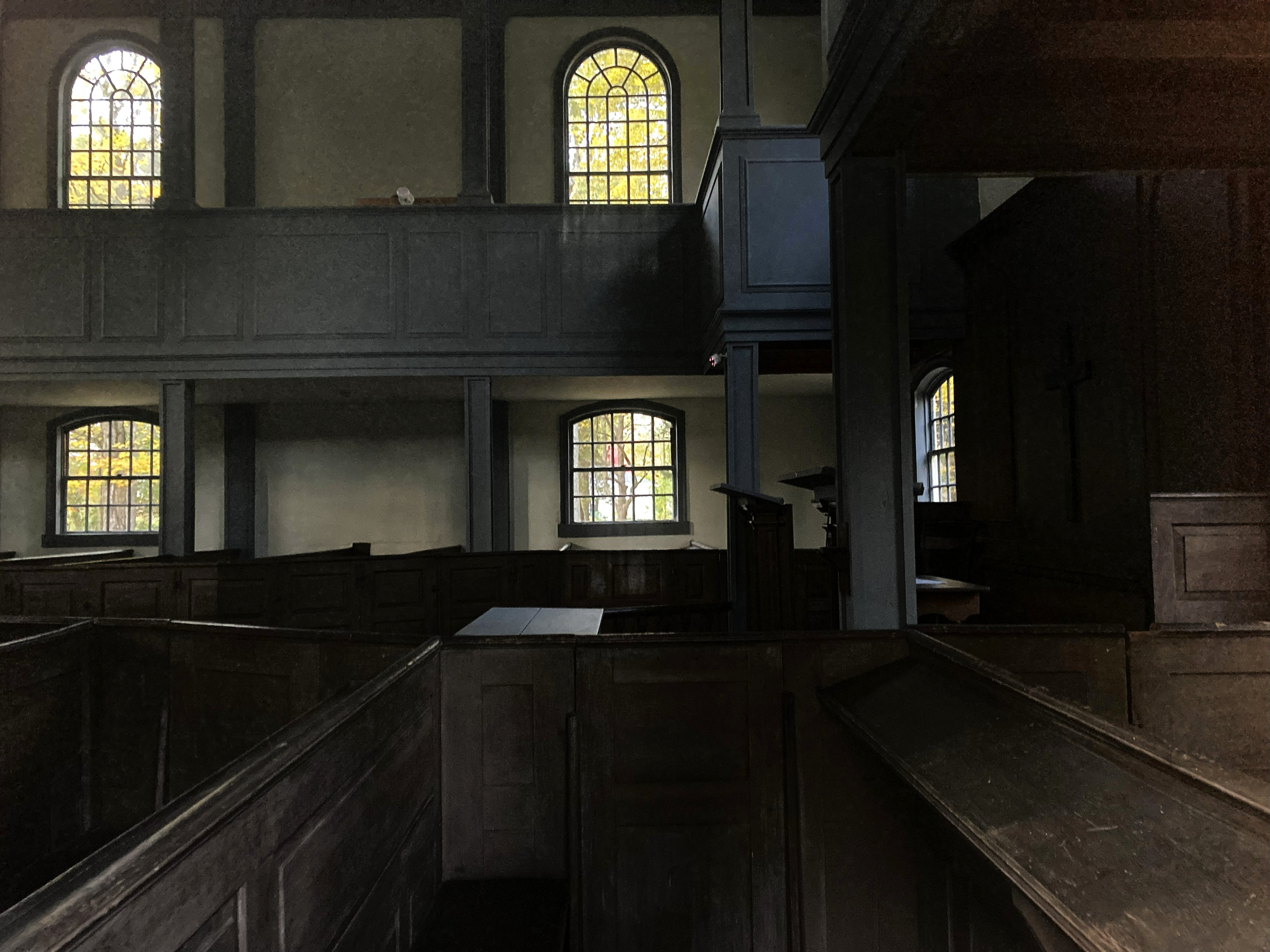
Church interior

Much of the money and effort to build the church came from Anglican churchman Godfrey Malbone, as a response to efforts to build a Congregational meetinghouse. Under Malbone's supervision, Trinity Church was finished in April 1771, ahead of the Congregational church. It is the oldest surviving Anglican church building in Connecticut. It is modeled on churches designed by Peter Harrison, and was built in part with the labor of slaves supplied by Malbone.

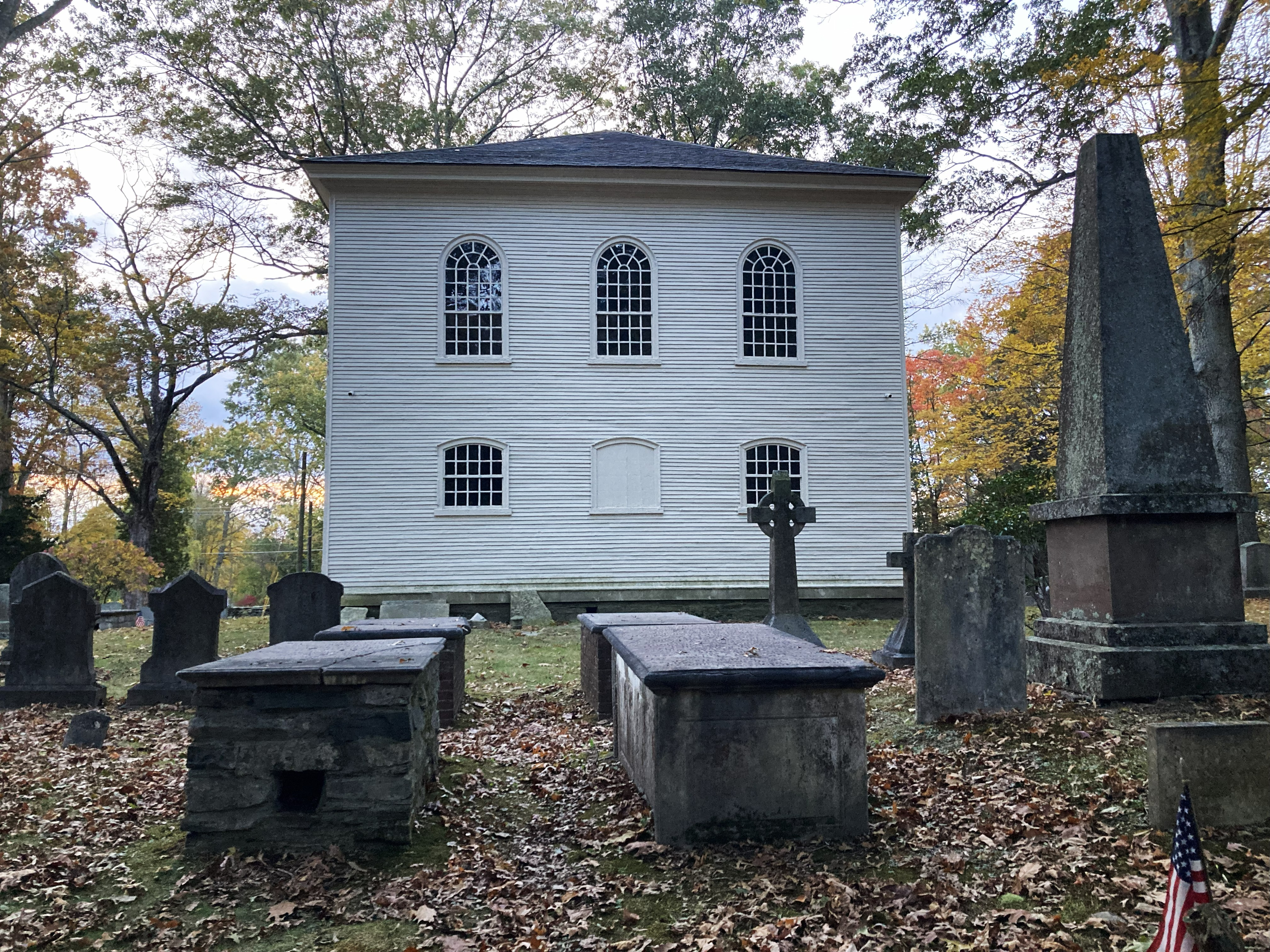
Portion of cemetery behind church

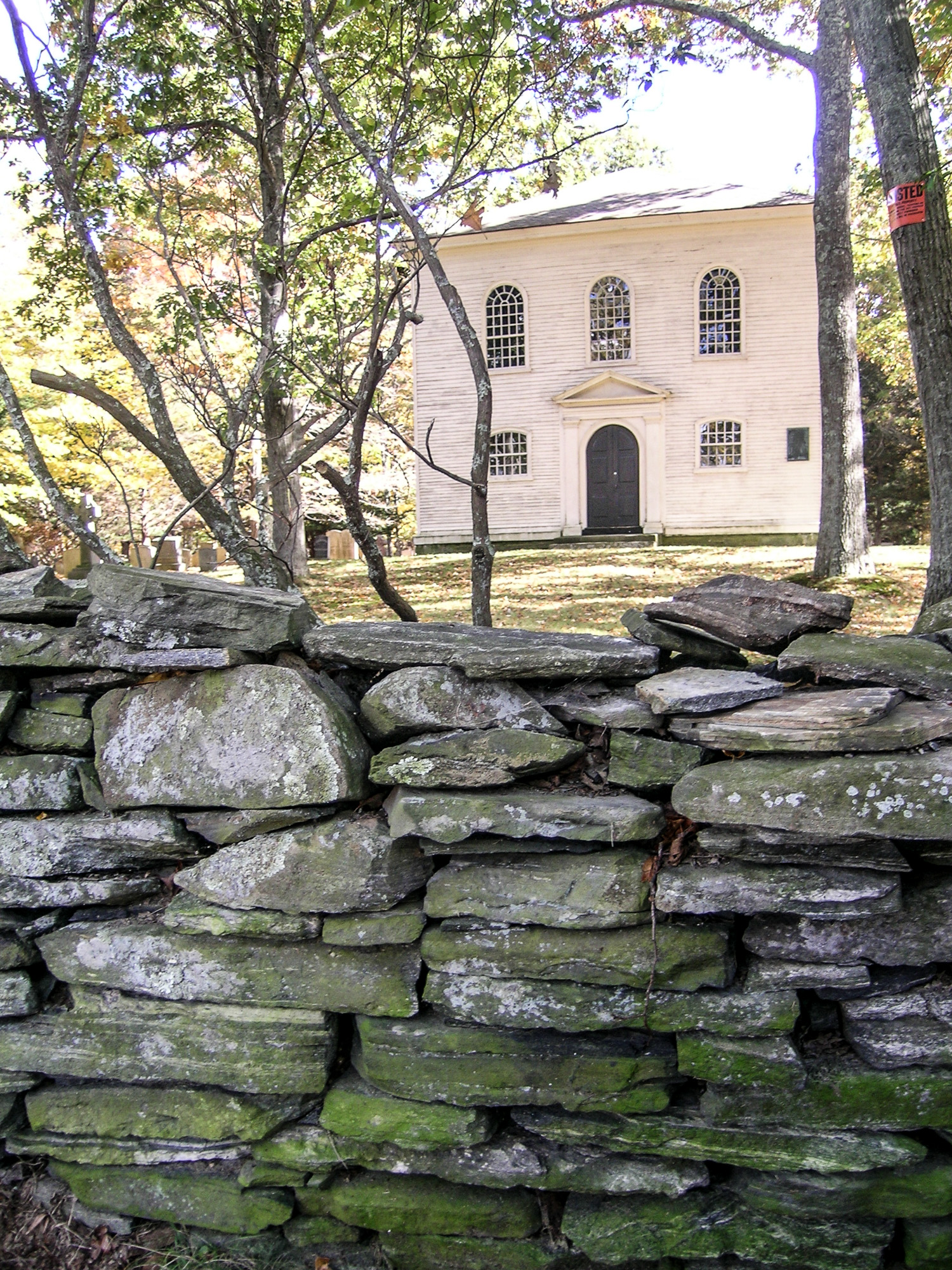
Historic wall in front of church

== See also ==
- National Register of Historic Places listings in Windham County, Connecticut
