= Brooklyn (CDP), Connecticut =

Census-designated place in Connecticut, United States

Brooklyn, Connecticut
- Census-designated place
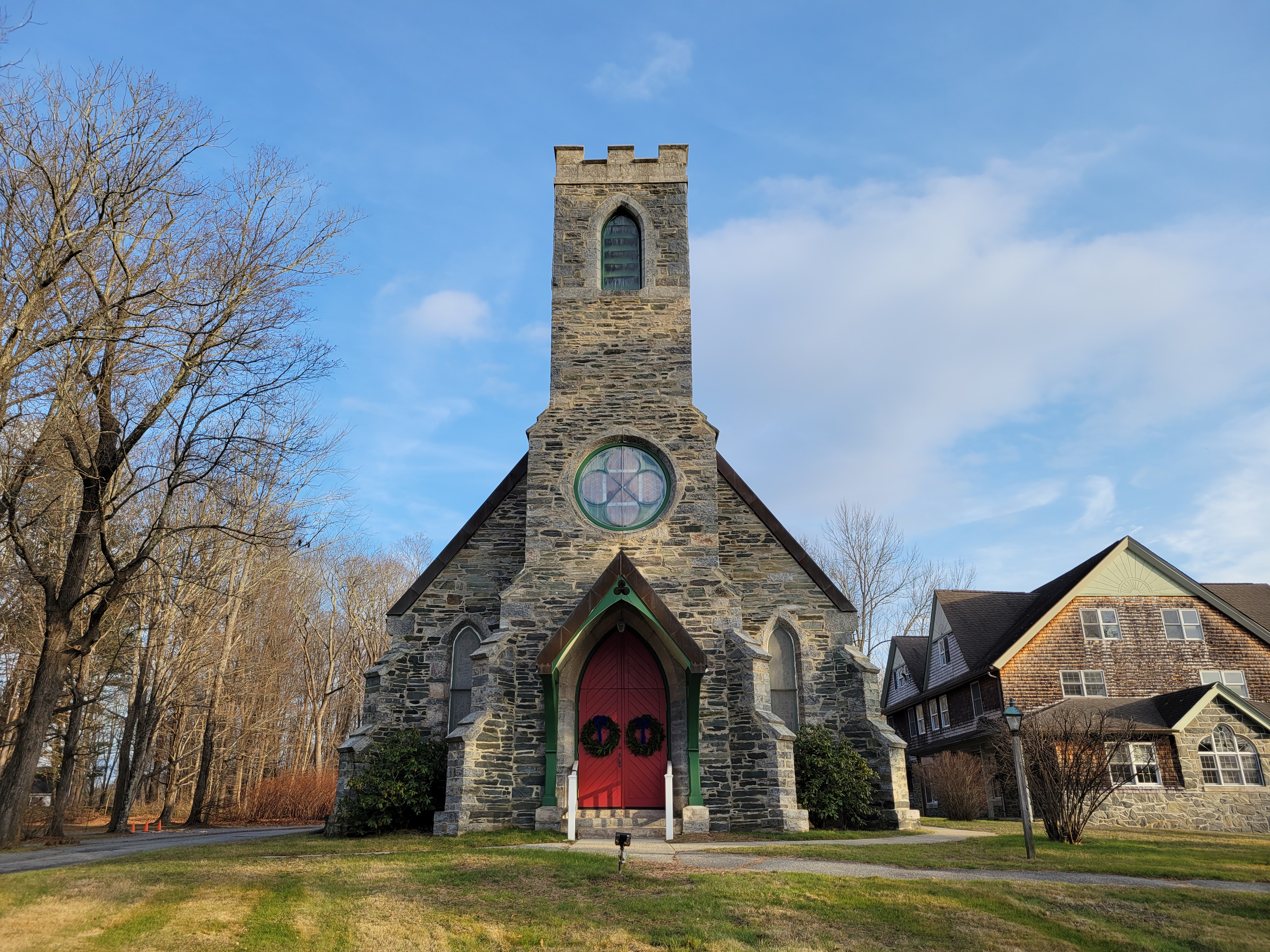
- Trinity Episcopal Church

- Location within Connecticut Location within the United States
- Coordinates: 41°47′17″N 71°56′58″W
- Country: United States
- State: Connecticut
- County: Windham
- Town: Brooklyn

Area
  - Total: 1.15 sq mi (2.99 km^{2})
  - Land: 1.15 sq mi (2.99 km^{2})
  - Water: 0 sq mi (0.0 km^{2})
- Elevation: 280 ft (85 m)

Population (2010)
  - Total: 981
  - Density: 850/sq mi (328.2/km^{2})
- Time zone: UTC-5 (Eastern (EST))
  - Summer (DST): UTC-4 (EDT)
- ZIP Code: 06234
- Area codes: 860/959
- FIPS code: 09-09120
- GNIS feature ID: 2631560

Brooklyn is a census-designated place (CDP) comprising the central unincorporated village in the town of Brooklyn in Windham County, Connecticut, United States. U.S. Route 6 passes through the center of the village, leading east to Danielson and west to Willimantic. As of the 2010 census, the population of the CDP was 981, out of 8,210 in the entire town of Brooklyn.

The Brooklyn Green Historic District is at the center of the village.
