= Adelaide Ward Peckham =

American bacteriologist (1848–1944)

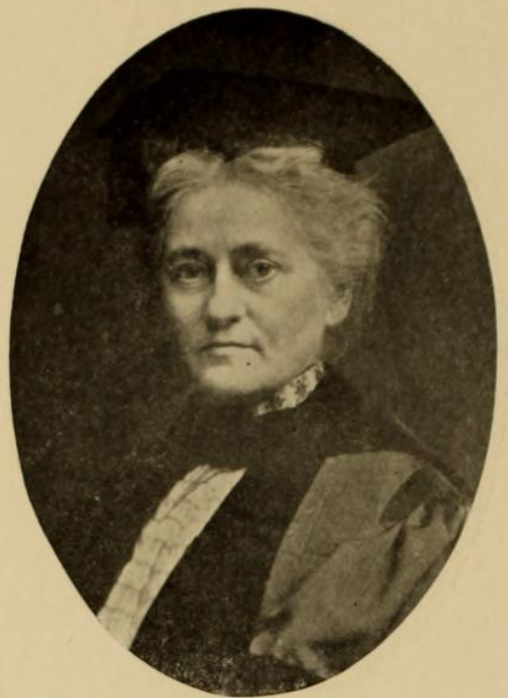
- Peckham in the 1911 yearbook of Woman's Medical College of Pennsylvania
- Born: March 31, 1848; Brooklyn, Connecticut, U.S.
- Died: May 13, 1944 (aged 96); Bloomfield, New Jersey, U.S.
- Occupations: Physician, bacteriologist, college professor

Adelaide Ward Peckham (March 31, 1848 – May 13, 1944) was an American physician, bacteriologist, and college professor.

== Early life and education ==
Peckham was born in Brooklyn, Connecticut, the daughter of Robert Congdon Peckham and Sarah Ann Segar Peckham. In 1882, she began studying medicine at the New York Infirmary for Women and Children, completing her medical degree in 1886. In time she took a stronger interest in laboratory work, and trained further for her new specialty at the University of Pennsylvania and Johns Hopkins Hospital, working with John Shaw Billings.

== Career ==
Peckham taught school as a young woman. After medical school, she moved to Philadelphia, where she had a private practice and also worked at the Woman's Hospital of Pennsylvania. Beginning in 1899 she was superintendent of the bacteriology laboratory at the Woman's Hospital, conducted bacteriological research, and taught courses at the Woman's Medical College of Pennsylvania for more than twenty years.

Publications by Peckham included "Study of a Case of Erysipelas Genitalium Due to the Use of Infected Ointment" (1893), "The Influence of Certain Agents in Destroying the Vitality of the Typhoid and of the Colon Bacillus" (Science 1895, with J. S. Billings), "A Study of the Colon Bacillus Group, and Especially of its Variability in Fermenting Power Under Different Conditions" (Science 1896), and "The Influence of Environment upon the Biological Processes of the Various Members of the Colon Group of Bacilli: An Experimental Study" (Science 1897).

== Personal life ==
Peckham spent several summers in California with her sister-in-law. She died at a nursing home in Bloomfield, New Jersey in 1944, aged 96 years.
