= Bush Hill Historic District =

Historic district in Connecticut, United States

- U.S. National Register of Historic Places
- U.S. Historic district
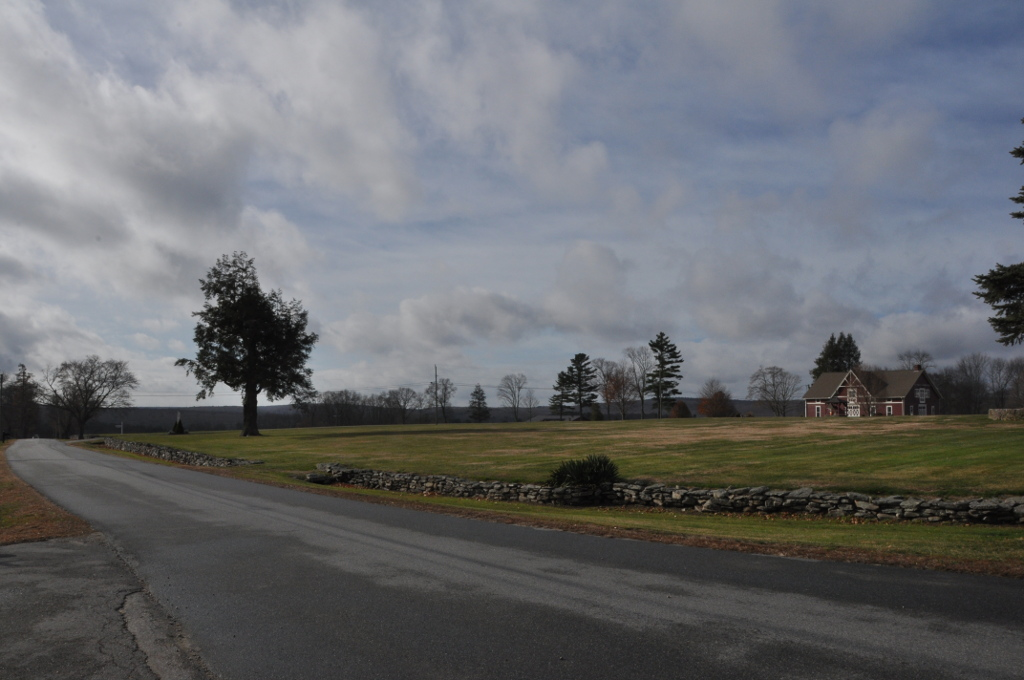

- Location within Connecticut Location within the United States
- Location: Parts of Bush Hill Road, CT 169, and Wolf Den Road, Brooklyn, Connecticut
- Coordinates: 41°48′43″N 71°57′52″W
- Area: 350 acres (140 ha)
- Built: 1740
- Architectural style: Greek Revival
- NRHP reference No.: 87000012
- Added to NRHP: February 10, 1987

The Bush Hill Historic District encompasses a historic rural landscape in central northern Brooklyn, Connecticut. It extends along parts of Bush Hill Road, Connecticut Route 169, and Wolf Den Road. The area has a remarkable concentration of farmhouses and agricultural outbuildings dating to the early 19th century or earlier. The district was listed on the National Register of Historic Places in 1987.

== Description and history ==
The Bush Hill Historic District is located on two ridges, one traversed by CT 169, and the other by Wolf Den Road, with Bush Hill Road providing a connection between them. The twenty houses that appear in the district are typically post-and-beam construction, with a large central chimney and a side-gable roof. Most were built either in the late 18th or early 19th century, and many are also accompanied by 19th-century agricultural outbuildings.

The area that is now Brooklyn was settled in the 1710s, with its first church established in 1728. The town was incorporated out of parts of Pomfret and Canterbury in 1786. Settlement in the town followed a pattern typical for eastern Connecticut, with farmsteads established on ridges, and farm sizes typically ranging from 100 to 150 acres. In the early years they were subsistence farms, which were typically developed in the 19th century to specialize in orchards or dairy farming. The Bush Hill area was settled mainly by members of the Williams and Putnam families; Israel Putnam, the most famous member of the latter family, had a large house in the town center, but his farm was not in this district.

== See also ==
- National Register of Historic Places listings in Windham County, Connecticut
