= Brooklyn Fair =

Agricultural fair in Brooklyn, Connecticut

Coordinates: 41.7802°N 71.9536°W

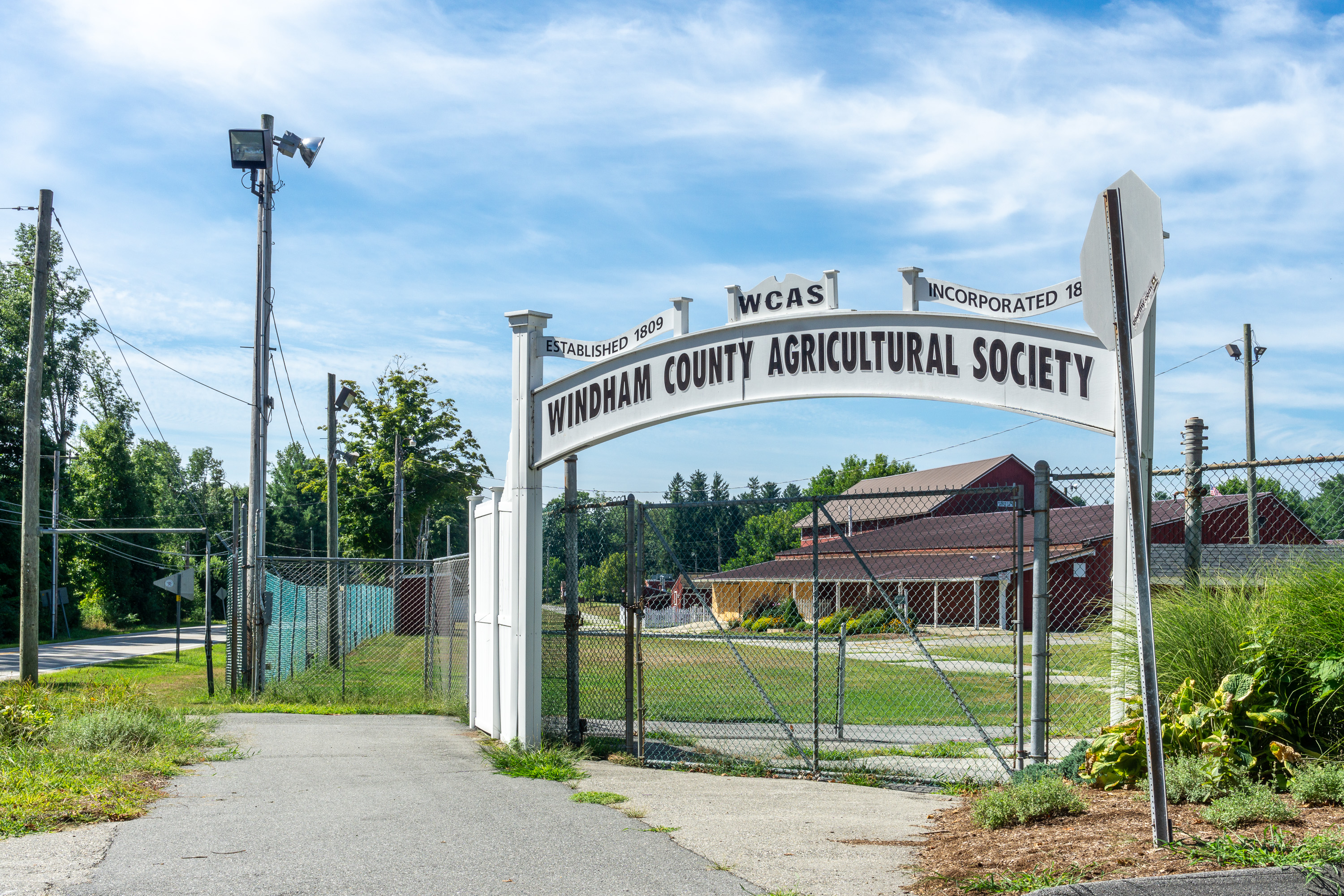
Brooklyn Fairgrounds, site of the annual Brooklyn Fair

The Brooklyn Fair is an annual agricultural fair held in Brooklyn, Connecticut, for the first time in 1809. It is considered the oldest agricultural fair in the United States.

The fair is organized by the Windham County Agricultural Society

== History ==
- In 1809, the first year of the fair, it was held on the site of what is currently known as the Vanilla Bean Cafe
- In the following years, the event was hosted in rotation in Woodstock, Brooklyn, and Pomfret, Connecticut
- About 10 years after the first fair, in 1820, the ~100 founders incorporated in the Windham County Agricultural Society.
- In the year 2000 the Society was recognized for its efforts by the Library of Congress in its "Bicentennial Local Legacies Project" as part of its 200th Anniversary celebration.
- No fair was held in 1917–18 because of World War I, 1942–45 because of World War II, or 2020 due to the COVID-19 pandemic.

== Entertainment ==
Year	Main Stage Events
2014	Eric Paslay, Danielle Bradbery, Collin Raye, Roomful of Blues
2013	Jana Kramer, Jerrod Niemann, Greg Bates, Soul Sound Revue
2012	Tyler Farr, Ayla Brown, Jack Ingram, Steve Holy, Changes in Latitudes
2011	Jimmy Lehoux, Craig Campbell, The JaneDear girls, Steve Holy, Changes in Latitudes
2010	Trent Tomlinson, Love and Theft, Lee Brice
2009	Jake Owen, Julianne Hough, Luke Bryan
2008	Darryl Worley, Lady Antebellum, Joe Diffie
