= Mortlach =

Mortlach may refer to:

- Mortlach, parish in Banffshire, the main settlement of which is Dufftown
  - Mortlach distillery, Scotch whisky distiller in Dufftown
  - Bishop of Mortlach, historic bishopric
  - Mortlach Parish Church
- Mortlach, Saskatchewan, a village in Canada

== See also ==
- Mortlake (disambiguation)
