= Mortlake, Connecticut =

Coordinates: 41°47′14″N 71°56′59″W

Mortlake was a historical place name in what is now Brooklyn, Connecticut.

== History ==
On October 19, 1687, the Connecticut Colonial General Court granted Captain William Blackwell a patent for a separate township laid out south of Mashamoquet Brook, six miles east to west and seven miles north to south, to be called Mortlake. Captain Blackwell chose that name to honor Mortlake in Surrey, England (now part of greater London).

Geographically, the northbound followed Mashamoquet Brook, the eastbound followed the Quinebaug. The western boundary was approximately half mile west of and parallel to today's Connecticut State Route 169, while the southern boundary laid approximately half mile north of today's U.S. Route 6 – looking at a map, it roughly aligned with Herrick Road and the part of Brown Road that runs more or less straight east–west.

This patent was in the form of a Manor, a form of tenure restricted to certain Proprietary colonies, a large estate with hereditary rights granted by royal charter, – a legal anomaly in Connecticut, where it was outside of the power and authority of any Town. Jurisdiction in Mortlake did not rest in an elected town government, but as property right that could be bought and sold. Falling outside the legal framework that Connecticut organized Towns, Mortlake's residents found themselves without responsibilities, but also without normal rights (such as to levy taxes to pay for roads and general welfare of its inhabitants). Indeed, once Windham County was established the very first case heard in its courts was a lawsuit by the Town of Norwich to force Mortlake to pay for the care of “the poor, witless Peter Davison” who resided originally in Mortlake. Massachusetts Governor Johnathan Belcher, who had purchased Mortlake from Captain Blackwell, was successfully defended by his attorney with the argument that Mortlake as a Manor did not have the same responsibilities to the poor as a Town would.

The Town of Pomfret bordered Mortlake to the North, West, and after Pomfret was expanded southward taking a portion of Canterbury, on the South as well. This southernmost part of Pomfret being the area today known as Brooklyn Center.

In 1731, an ecclesiastical society was formed to establish a Congregational Church for the benefit of the residents of the area – consisting of the southern half of Mortlake (the present Brooklyn / Pomfret town line), the southernmost parts of Pomfret, and the northern section of Canterbury.

It would take four years, but in 1735 the society was formally named the odd construct, “The Society taken out of Pomfret, Canterbury, and Mortlake.” The area was referred to as Mortlake Parish, with the church referred to as the Second Church of Pomfret.

In 1739, Governor Belcher sold portions of Mortlake to Israel Putnam and John Pope of Salem, Massachusetts. Putnam would settle in Mortlake, and later buy out Pope. The remaining portions of Mortlake were sold to Godfrey Malbone of Newport, Rhode Island by Governor Belcher the following year.

The lack of town status continued to be a problem – residents of the southern village of Pomfret had to cross for some seven miles through Mortlake before re-entering Pomfret again. Further, at the time Town taxes were levied to support the Church – but the portions of Mortlake Parish within Mortlake Manor laid outside of either Pomfret or Canterbury, and thus could not be taxed to support the Church its residents where expected to attend.

Finally in May 1752, the General Court decided “that this tract of Mortlake shall be accounted, taken, and doomed to belong to Pomfret.” At the same time, they also replaced the lengthy name of the ecclesiastical society with the much simpler, “Society of Brooklyn” known as Brooklyn Parish.

In 1775 Israel Putnam, who held a commission from the Colony of Connecticut as a Major General, was plowing a field in Brooklyn Center (near where the library is today) when word reached him of the Battle of Lexington and Concord. Leaving his plow in the field, he rode a relay of horses to reach Boston in only 18 hours, taking command of the rebel forces, and at Breed's Hill uttering the famous, “Don't shoot until you see the whites of their eyes!”

Brooklyn Parish in 1786 would be set off from Pomfret and Canterbury to become a town in its own right.

In the 1920s and 30s, Edith Kermit Carow, wife of Theodore Roosevelt, operated an old family property as Mortlake House – a country inn for vacationing city visitors. Mrs. Roosevelt was a descendant of the Tyler family, and the Tylers where related by marriage to the Putnams.

Mortlake House was demolished in the late 1960s. Today, the Post Office stands on that spot, with a large equestrian statue of General Putnam adjacent to it, and the Daniel Tyler Law Office, which serves as the small museum of the Brooklyn Historical Society, at the rear of the property. The Tyler family continues to maintain the family homestead, Putnam Elms, on Church Street in Brooklyn as a historical site that is occasionally open to the general public.

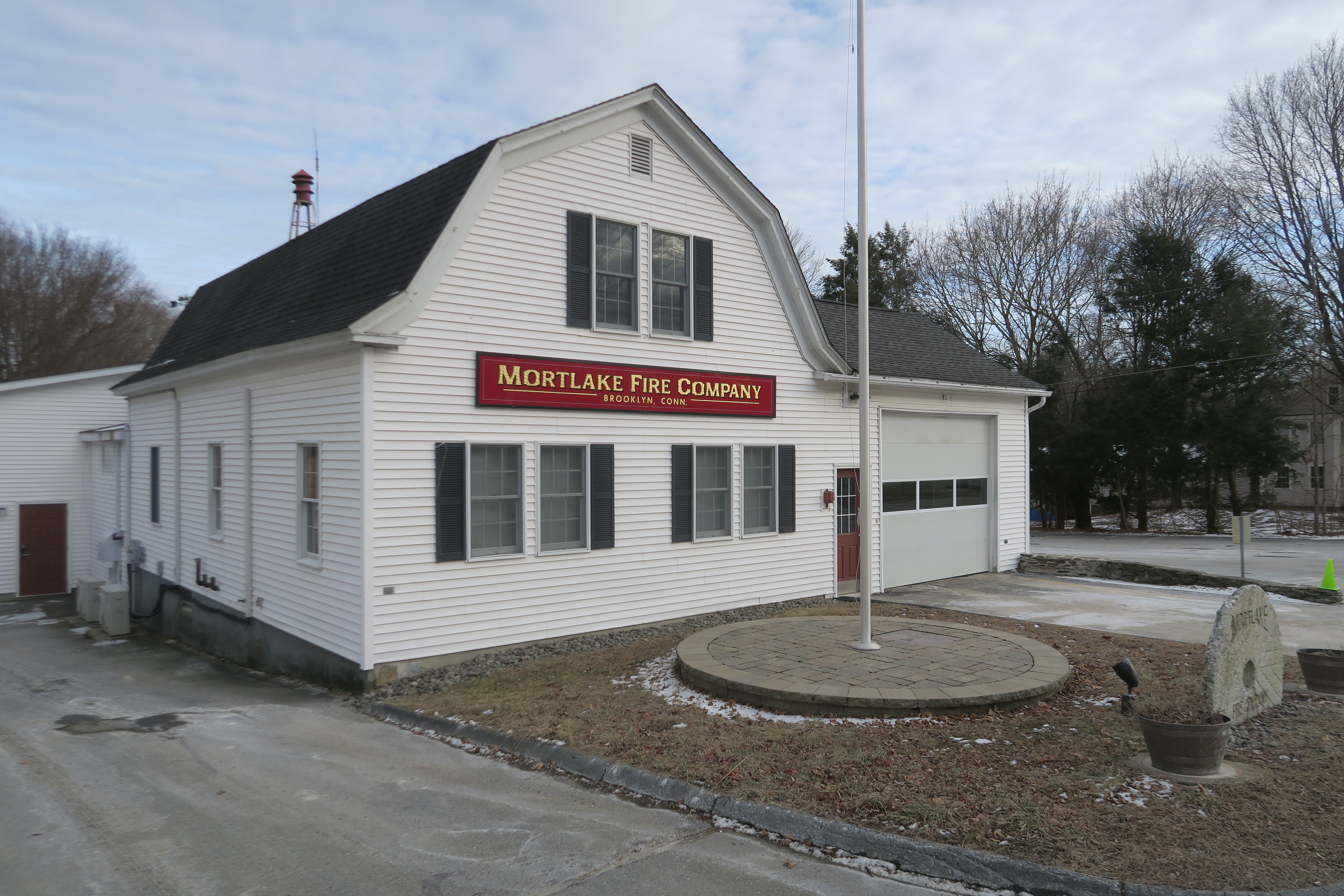
Mortlake Fire Company

In 1927 the citizens of Brooklyn Center established a volunteer fire department, and as a nod to both the history of the area being known as Mortlake and to Mrs. Roosevelt and her establishment named the organization, “The Mortlake Fire Company of Brooklyn, Connecticut, Inc.” – which carries that name until this day.
