= Brooklyn Green Historic District =

Historic district in Connecticut, United States

- U.S. National Register of Historic Places
- U.S. Historic district
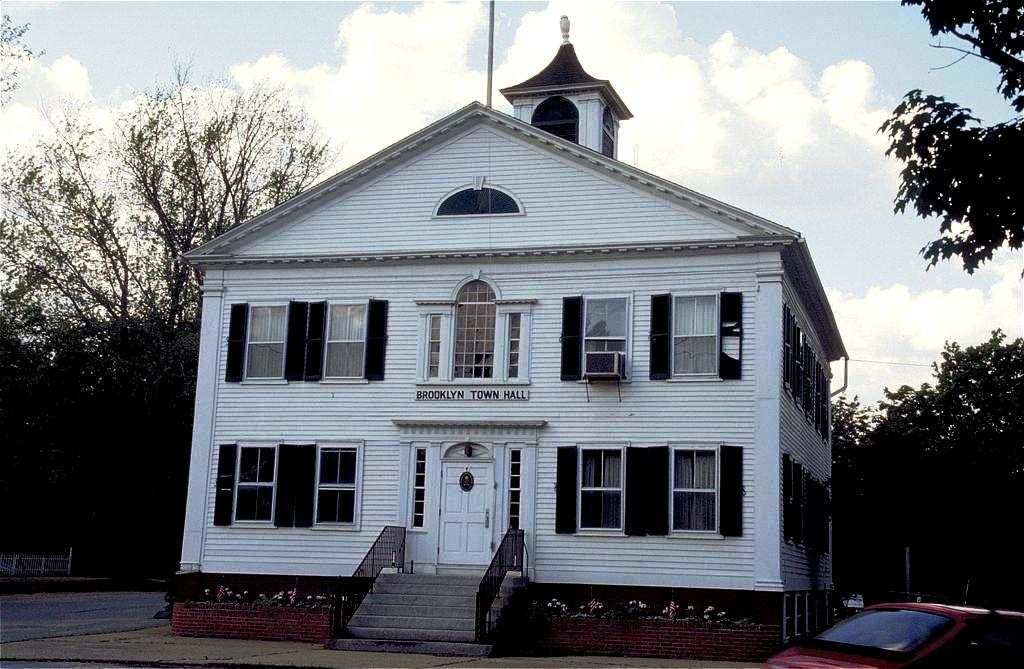
- Brooklyn Town Hall

- Location within Connecticut Location within the United States
- Location: CT 169, 205, and US 6, Wolf Den, Brown, Prince Hill, and Hyde Roads, Brooklyn, Connecticut
- Coordinates: 41°47′18″N 71°56′57″W
- Architect: Multiple
- Architectural style: Greek Revival, Colonial, Federal
- NRHP reference No.: 82004401
- Added to NRHP: September 23, 1982

Brooklyn Green Historic District is a historic district on Route 169, Route 205, U.S. Route 6, Wolf Den, Brown, Prince Hill, and Hyde Roads in the town of Brooklyn, Connecticut. The district is notable for its Greek Revival, Colonial, and Federal architecture. It was added to the National Register of Historic Places in 1982.

== Description ==
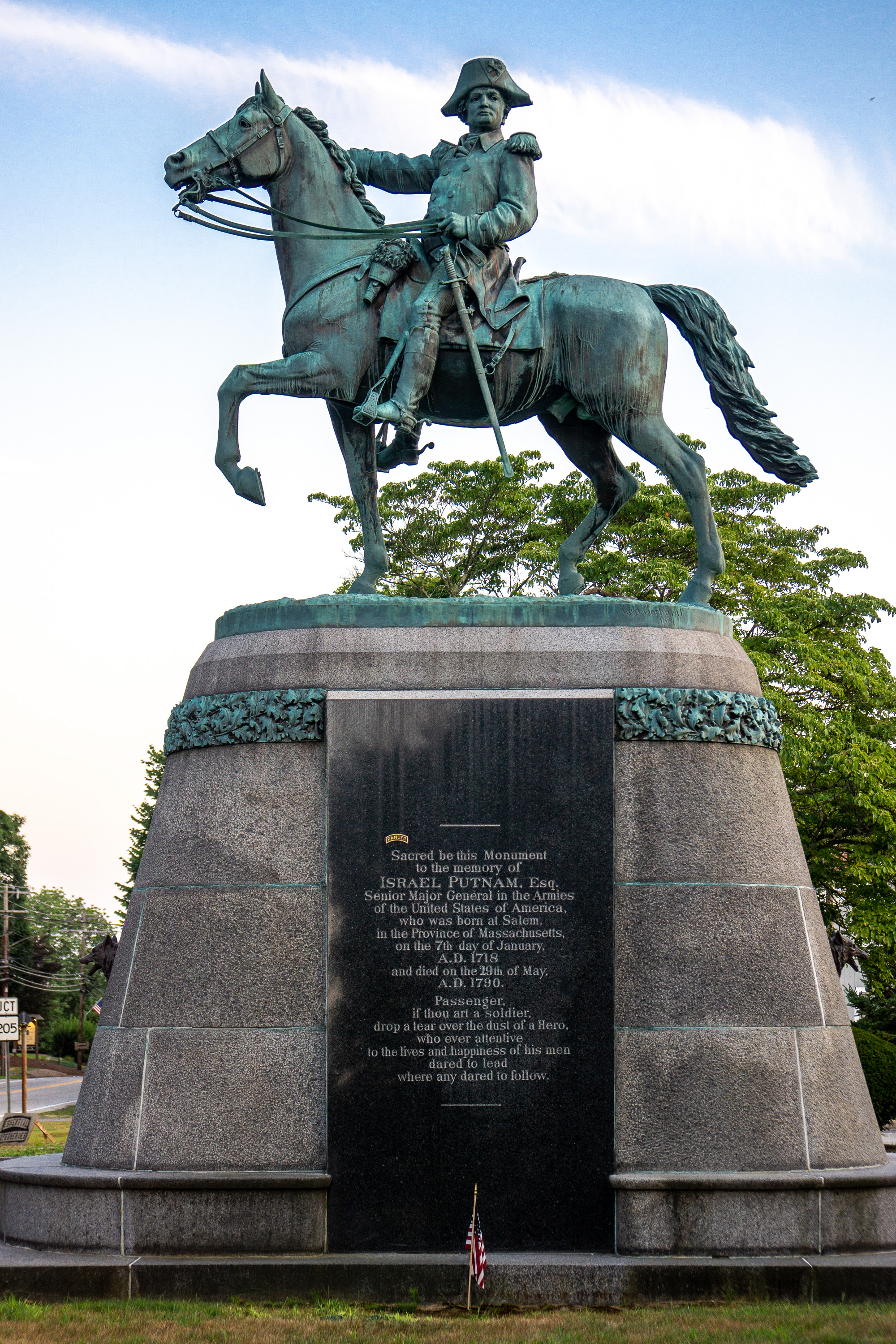
The Israel Putnam Monument contains the remains of the hometown Revolutionary hero

The district has significance as an illustration of certain broad patterns of development in Connecticut, for its collection of architecture, and for its association with historically important individuals.

The centerpiece of the district is the Brooklyn Green, a 1.75-acre (7,100 m^{2}) village green in the center of the town. The Green is roughly a square bounded on four sides by streets. There are also two streets cutting across diagonally, resulting in four separate triangular sections. The eastern triangle contains the Brooklyn Meeting House. The area around the Green contains various important town buildings, including the town hall, town library, two churches (Trinity Episcopal and Federated Church of Christ), and several historic residences dating from the mid-18th century. The roads around the Green are Route 169 on the east, Putnam Place on the north and west, Brooklyn Common on the south. The diagonal streets are Wolf Den Road (northwest to southeast) and U.S. Route 6 (northeast to southwest).

The Green's adjacent buildings were photographed by the Historic American Buildings Survey program. The summary from the HABS catalog record is:

Little altered since the mid-nineteenth century, Brooklyn Green is significant as a small, rural area that still retains much of its eighteenth- and nineteenth-century material heritage. The physical organization of the area reflects the historical development of the town and the region, including its growth in the first half of the nineteenth century and decline in the decades that followed. Many of the buildings and structures located near the Brooklyn Green are architecturally significant, exemplifying the styles that were popular between 1750 and 1850, the area's period of greatest significance. Finally, some of the buildings and structures are associated with the lives of prominent individuals in Brooklyn history, including Israel Putnam (1718-1790) and Daniel Tyler, Jr. (ca. 1700-1800).

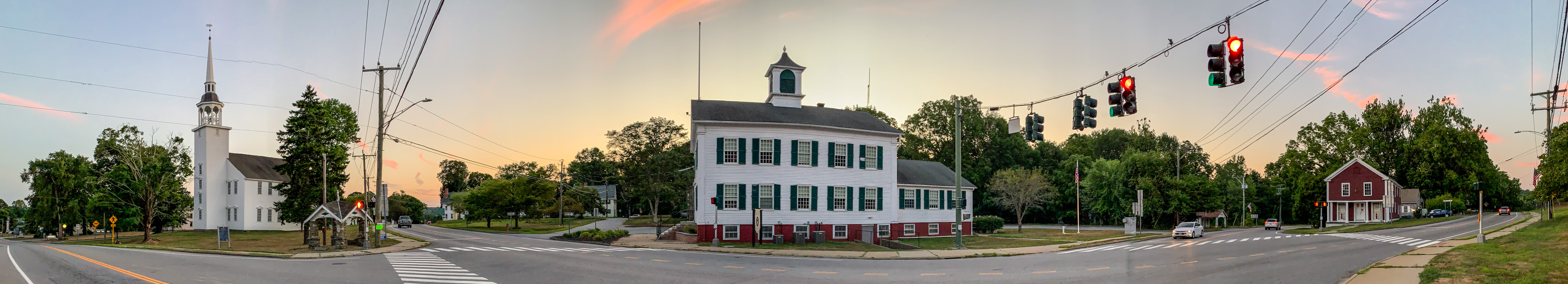
Panorama of the Brooklyn Green Historic District, Connecticut. Left: Unitarian Church. Center: Brooklyn Town Hall.

== See also ==
- Mortlake, Connecticut - original settlement in the area
- National Register of Historic Places listings in Windham County, Connecticut
