= East Brooklyn, Connecticut =

Census-designated place in Connecticut, United States

- Census-designated place
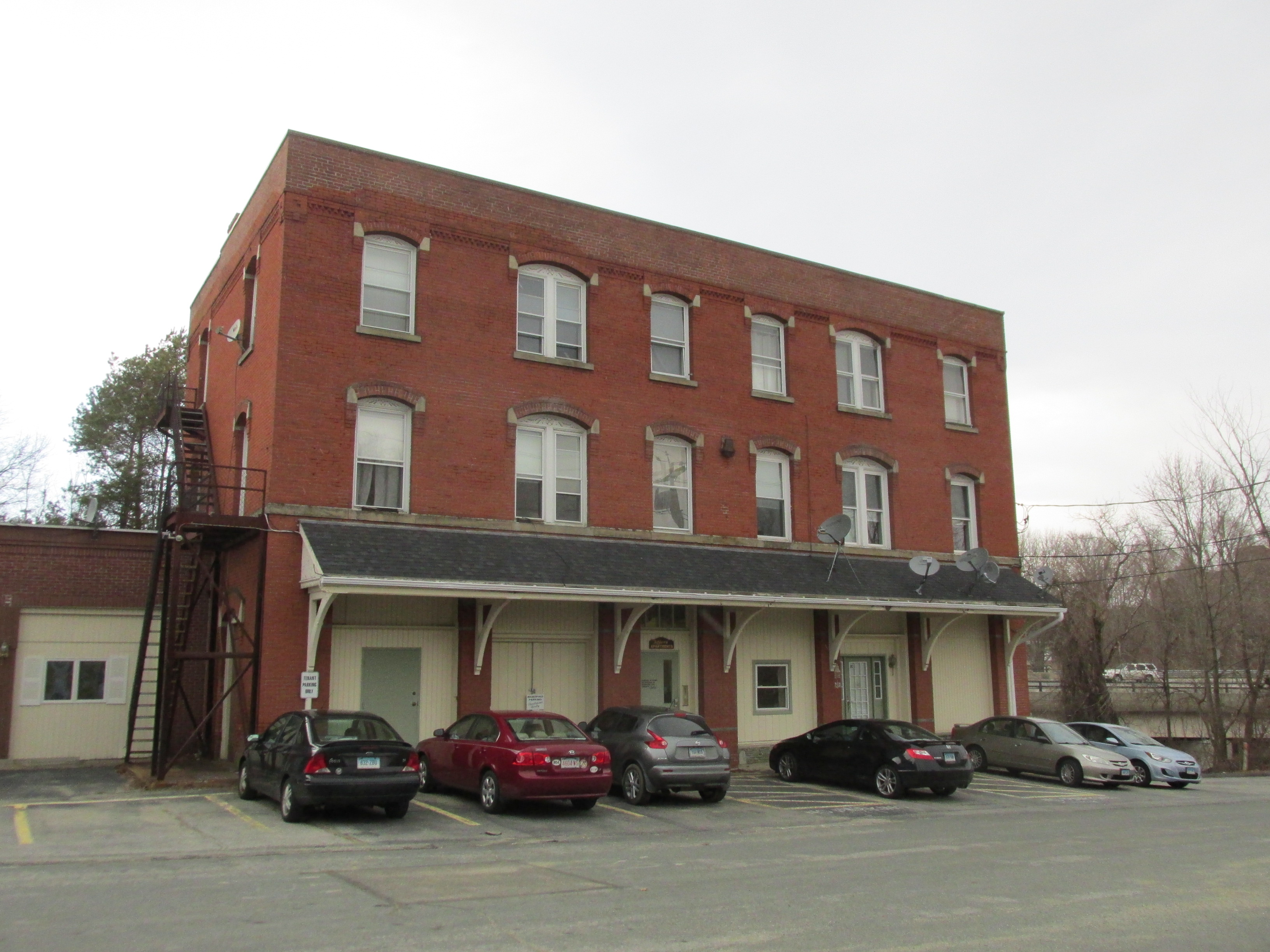
- Tiffany Apartments

- Location in Windham County and the state of Connecticut.
- Coordinates: 41°47′44″N 71°53′54″W
- Country: United States
- State: Connecticut
- County: Windham County
- Region: Northeastern CT
- Town: Brooklyn

Area
  - Total: 2.570 sq mi (6.66 km^{2})
  - Land: 2.541 sq mi (6.58 km^{2})
  - Water: 0.029 sq mi (0.075 km^{2})
- Elevation: 276 ft (84 m)

Population (2020)
  - Total: 2,205
  - Density: 868/sq mi (335/km^{2})
- Time zone: UTC-5 (Eastern (EST))
  - Summer (DST): UTC-4 (EDT)
- ZIP code: 06239
- Area code: 860
- FIPS code: 09-21160
- GNIS feature ID: 0206799

East Brooklyn is a census-designated place (CDP) located within the town of Brooklyn in Windham County, Connecticut, United States. It is the portion of the Danielson urban cluster within the town of Brooklyn. The population was 2,205 at the 2020 census. US 6 runs through the town and severs the town.

The portion of the CDP near the Quinebaug River is known as the Quinebaug Mill-Quebec Square Historic District.

== Geography ==
According to the United States Census Bureau, the CDP has a total area of 2.57 square miles (6.7 km^{2}), of which 2.54 square miles (6.6 km^{2}) is land and 0.03 square miles (0.078 km^{2}) (1.1%) is water.

== Demographics ==
=== 2020 census ===
As of the 2020 census, East Brooklyn had a population of 2,205. The median age was 40.0 years. 23.3% of residents were under the age of 18 and 16.1% of residents were 65 years of age or older. For every 100 females there were 87.7 males, and for every 100 females age 18 and over there were 87.5 males age 18 and over.

97.2% of residents lived in urban areas, while 2.8% lived in rural areas.

There were 977 households in East Brooklyn, of which 29.8% had children under the age of 18 living in them. Of all households, 40.5% were married-couple households, 19.9% were households with a male householder and no spouse or partner present, and 31.3% were households with a female householder and no spouse or partner present. About 32.1% of all households were made up of individuals and 15.4% had someone living alone who was 65 years of age or older.

There were 1,009 housing units, of which 3.2% were vacant. The homeowner vacancy rate was 0.2% and the rental vacancy rate was 1.3%.

Racial composition as of the 2020 census
Race	Number	Percent
White	1,885	85.5%
Black or African American	30	1.4%
American Indian and Alaska Native	4	0.2%
Asian	51	2.3%
Native Hawaiian and Other Pacific Islander	0	0.0%
Some other race	53	2.4%
Two or more races	182	8.3%
Hispanic or Latino (of any race)	170	7.7%

=== 2000 census ===
As of the census of 2000, there were 1,473 people, 668 households, and 378 families residing in the CDP. The population density was 348.9 people/km^{2} (904 people/mi^{2}). There were 690 housing units at an average density of 163.4 units/km^{2} (423 units/mi^{2}). The racial makeup of the CDP was 94.30% White, 2.04% African American, 0.81% Native American, 0.75% Asian, 0.41% from other races, and 1.70% from two or more races. Hispanic or Latino of any race were 1.83% of the population.

There were 668 households, out of which 28.1% had children under the age of 18 living with them, 35.8% were married couples living together, 15.9% had a female householder with no husband present, and 43.4% were non-families. 37.7% of all households were made up of individuals, and 20.4% had someone living alone who was 65 years of age or older. The average household size was 2.21 and the average family size was 2.87.

In the CDP, the population was spread out, with 25.2% under the age of 18, 7.9% from 18 to 24, 28.4% from 25 to 44, 19.3% from 45 to 64, and 19.2% who were 65 years of age or older. The median age was 38 years. For every 100 females, there were 85.8 males. For every 100 females age 18 and over, there were 77.5 males.

The median income for a household in the CDP was $25,813, and the median income for a family was $34,265. Males had a median income of $27,500 versus $23,182 for females. The per capita income for the CDP was $15,093. About 11.3% of families and 15.5% of the population were below the poverty line, including 18.0% of those under age 18 and 6.5% of those age 65 or over.
