= Bush Hill, Gauteng =

Bush Hill
- Location within Gauteng Location within South Africa
- Coordinates: 26.094°S 27.948°E
- Country: South Africa
- Province: Gauteng
- Municipality: City of Johannesburg
- Main Place: Randburg

Area
  - Total: 0.40 km^{2} (0.15 sq mi)

Population (2001)
  - Total: 429
  - Density: 1,100/km^{2} (2,800/sq mi)

Racial makeup (2001)
  - Black African: 11.2%
  - White: 86.0%
  - Other: 2.8%

First languages (2001)
  - English: 68.5%
  - Afrikaans: 15.4%
  - Tswana: 3.5%
  - Zulu: 3.5%
  - Other: 9.1%
- Time zone: UTC+2 (SAST)
- Area code: 011

Bush Hill is a suburb of Randburg, South Africa. It is located in Region C of the City of Johannesburg Metropolitan Municipality.
