= Putnam Farm =

- U.S. National Register of Historic Places
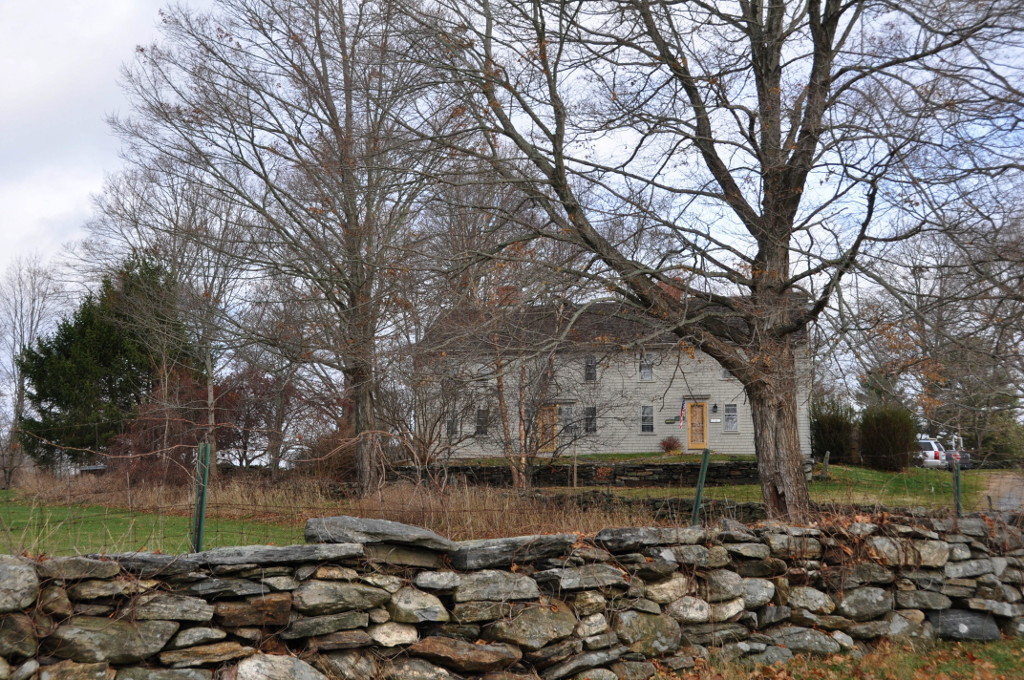

- Location within Connecticut Location within the United States
- Location: Spaulding Road, Brooklyn, Connecticut
- Coordinates: 41°49′24″N 71°57′3″W
- Area: 9.4 acres (3.8 ha)
- Built: 1750
- Architectural style: Federal
- NRHP reference No.: 82004399
- Added to NRHP: March 11, 1982

The Putnam Farm is a historic farm on Spaulding Road in Brooklyn, Connecticut. The property, now just 9 acres (3.6 ha) of agricultural land with a house (built about 1750) on it, was the centerpiece of a vast landholding in the mid-18th century by Major General Israel Putnam, a major colonial-era military figure who saw action in both the French and Indian War and in the American Revolutionary War. The property was listed on the National Register of Historic Places in 1982.

== Description and history ==
The Putnam Farm is located in a rural area of northern Brooklyn, on the north side of Spaulding Road east of Connecticut Route 169. The house is set among rolling fields, facing roughly south toward the road, which is lined with stone walls. The house is large in size but modest in styling, 2 1/2 stories in height, with a gabled roof and clapboarded exterior. Its main facade is eight bays across, with two entrances and asymmetrically placed window bays. Architecturally, it is composed of two separate structures set about 3.5 feet (1.1 m) apart, the area in between filled in by walls and flooring. The exterior and interior both have modest examples of Federal period woodwork, including fireplace mantels.

Israel Putnam, a native of Danvers, Massachusetts, purchased 500 acres (200 ha) of land in what was then part of Pomfret from Massachusetts Governor Jonathan Belcher in 1739. He was judged one of the area's successful farmers, raising cattle and sheep. The oldest portion of the present house was built by Putnam about 1750, in order to accommodate his growing family. Putnam served with distinction in the colonial militia during the French and Indian War, and achieved broad recognition throughout the British colonies for his exploits. In 1767 he moved into Brooklyn village, where he operated a tavern and engaged in politics, leaving operation of the farm to his son. Putnam would achieve further renown at the Battle of Bunker Hill in the American Revolutionary War.

Putnam's son sold the farm in 1795 to a neighbor. The house Putnam built was doubled in size in the early 19th century, at which time it was also given modest Federal styling. In 1839 it was purchased by Joshua Collins, whose family owned it for over 100 years. The Collinses sold off most of the farmland after World War II, leaving the house standing on about 9 acres (3.6 ha).

== See also ==
- National Register of Historic Places listings in Windham County, Connecticut
- General Israel Putnam House - Israel Putnam birthplace
