= Brooklyn, Connecticut =

- Town
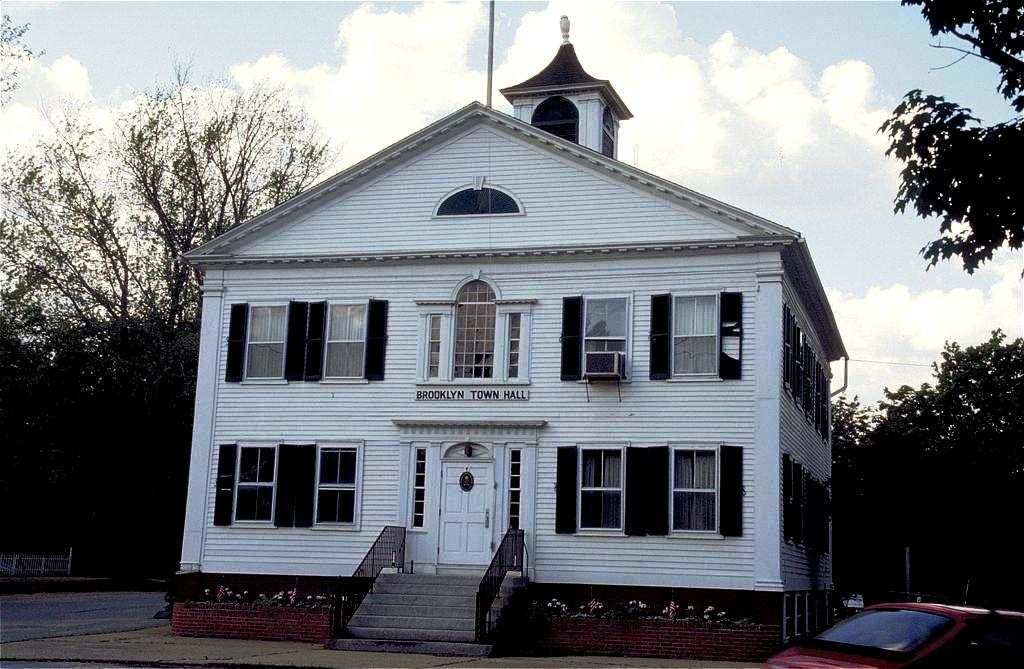
- Brooklyn town hall

- Seal

- Interactive map of Brooklyn, Connecticut
- Coordinates: 41°47′17″N 71°56′59″W
- Country: United States
- U.S. state: Connecticut
- County: Windham
- Region: Northeastern CT
- Incorporated: 1786

Government
  - Type: Selectman-town meeting
  - First selectman: Austin Tanner (R)
  - Selectmen: Ray Preece (R); Joseph Voccio (D)

Area
  - Total: 29.1 sq mi (75.4 km^{2})
  - Land: 29.0 sq mi (75.0 km^{2})
  - Water: 0.15 sq mi (0.4 km^{2})
- Elevation: 210 ft (64 m)

Population (2020)
  - Total: 8,450
  - Density: 292/sq mi (112.7/km^{2})
- Time zone: UTC-5 (EST)
  - Summer (DST): UTC-4 (EDT)
- ZIP code: 06234, 06239
- Area codes: 860/959
- FIPS code: 09-09190
- GNIS feature ID: 0213400
- Website: www.brooklynct.org

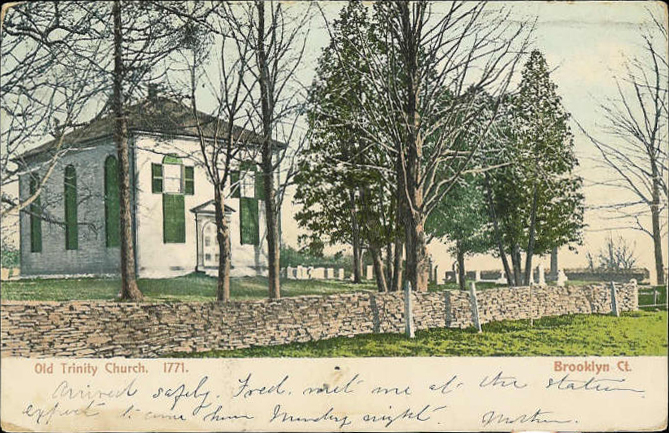
Old Trinity Church (postcard from 1907)

Brooklyn is a town in Windham County, Connecticut, United States. The town is part of the Northeastern Connecticut Planning Region. The population was 8,450 at the 2020 census. The town center village is listed by the U.S. Census Bureau as a census-designated place. The district of East Brooklyn is listed as a separate census-designated place.

== Geography ==
According to the United States Census Bureau, the town has a total area of 29.1 square miles (75 km^{2}), of which, 29.0 square miles (75 km^{2}) of it is land and 0.2 square miles (0.52 km^{2}) of it (0.58%) is water.

== History ==
Brooklyn was settled in the late 17th century and incorporated as its own town in 1786. It is named for the Quinebaug River, or Brook Line, which forms its eastern boundary. Brooklyn was originally land of the Wabaquasset. It was incorporated as a town separate from Canterbury and Pomfret in May 1786. It is home to the Brooklyn Fair, America's oldest continuously operating agricultural fair, as well as the Brooklyn Correctional Institution, a state-run medium security prison.

Brooklyn held the 1833 trial of Prudence Crandall, a schoolteacher charged with the crime of educating black female students in nearby Canterbury.

Brooklyn is the final resting place of Revolutionary War General Israel Putnam. Though he was originally buried in an above ground tomb in Brooklyn's South Cemetery, his remains had to be moved due to excessive visitors. In 1888, a statue of Putnam mounted on a horse was erected, and his sarcophagus placed in the foundation. The statue stands slightly south of the town green, in front of the post office. Brooklyn is also home of the Middle School Bobcats and Elementary School Bears.

The town historical society operates the Brooklyn Historical Society Museum, which includes the Daniel Putnam Tyler Law Office.

=== Villages ===
- Allen Hill
- Barrett Hill
- Brooklyn Center
- Bush Hill
- East Brooklyn
- Quebec
- Stetson's Corners
- Tatnic Hill
- West Village
- West Wauregan

== National Register of Historic Places ==
- Brooklyn Green Historic District – (added October 23, 1982)
- Bush Hill Historic District – (added March 10, 1987).
- Putnam Farm – Spaulding Road (added April 11, 1982)
- Trinity Church – Church Street (added November 15, 1970)
- Unitarian Meetinghouse – (added December 9, 1972)
- Quinebaug Mill-Quebec Square Historic District – Roughly bounded by Quinebaug River, Quebec Square, Elm and South Main Streets (added August 29, 1985).

== Education ==
Residents are served by the Brooklyn School District's Brooklyn Elementary School (K–4) and Brooklyn Middle School (5–8).

Many Brooklyn high school students attend Woodstock Academy; Woodstock was designated as one of Brooklyn's high schools since 1987. Many Brooklyn high school students attend Killingly High School in Danielson. Some students attend H.H. Ellis Technical High School, or the Norwich Free Academy.

== Demographics ==
Historical population
Census	Pop.	Note	%±
1820	1,254		—
1850	1,514		—
1860	2,136		41.1%
1870	2,354		10.2%
1880	2,308		−2.0%
1890	2,628		13.9%
1900	2,358		−10.3%
1910	1,858		−21.2%
1920	1,655		−10.9%
1930	2,250		36.0%
1940	2,403		6.8%
1950	2,652		10.4%
1960	3,312		24.9%
1970	4,965		49.9%
1980	5,691		14.6%
1990	6,681		17.4%
2000	7,173		7.4%
2010	8,210		14.5%
2020	8,450		2.9%
U.S. Decennial Census

As of the census of 2010, there were 8,244 people, 3,001 households, and 2,105 families residing in the town. There were 3,247 housing units at an average density of 92.4 per square mile. The racial makeup of the town was 92.7% White, 2.9% African American, 0.3% Native American, 1.1% Asian, 0% Pacific Islander, 1.8% from other races, and 1.2% from two or more races. Hispanic or Latino of any race were 4% of the population.

There were 3,001 households, out of which 30.7% had children under the age of 18 living with them, 53.9% were married couples living together, 11.2% had a female householder with no husband present, and 29.9% were non-families. 24.2% of all households were made up of individuals 65 years of age or older. The average household size was 2.55 and the average family size was 3.01.

In the town, the population was spread out, with 24% under the age of 20, 5.5% from 20 to 24, 27.3% from 25 to 44, 36.7% from 45 to 64, and 14.4% who were 65 years of age or older. The median age was 40.9 years.

The median income as of the 2000 Census for a household in the town was $49,756, and the median income for a family was $60,208. Males had a median income of $39,246 versus $28,889 for females. The per capita income for the town was $20,359. About 4.2% of families and 5.8% of the population were below the poverty line, including 6.2% of those under age 18 and 3.2% of those age 65 or over.

Voter Registration and Party Enrollment as of November 1, 2022
Party	Active Voters	Inactive Voters	Total Voters	Percentage
Democratic	1,299	236	1,535	23.99%
Republican	1,427	171	1,598	24.97%
Unaffiliated	2,549	597	3,146	49.16%
Minor Parties	104	16	120	1.88%
Total	5,379	1,020	6,399	100%

Presidential Election Results
Year	Democratic	Republican	Third Parties
2020	44.4% 1,876	53.6% 2,262	2.0% 84
2016	39.2% 1,462	55.2% 2,052	5.6% 201
2012	51.6% 1,743	46.4% 1,570	2.0% 68
2008	52.4% 1,932	45.5% 1,674	2.1% 76
2004	49.5% 1,668	48.3% 1,628	2.2% 73
2000	53.6% 1,589	38.9% 1,153	7.5% 222
1996	48.8% 1,363	34.5% 965	16.7% 467
1992	37.5% 1,220	32.9% 1,072	29.6% 960
1988	43.8% 1,133	54.9% 1,422	1.3% 31
1984	36.0% 908	63.7% 1,606	0.3% 7
1980	36.7% 870	50.8% 1,206	12.5% 296
1976	49.0% 1,098	50.2% 1,124	0.8% 18
1972	37.6% 804	61.2% 1,310	1.2% 25
1968	52.4% 963	44.0% 809	3.6% 65
1964	73.6% 1,286	26.4% 462	0.00% 0
1960	54.1% 890	45.9% 754	0.00% 0
1956	41.7% 604	58.3% 844	0.00% 0

== Notable people ==
- David Low Dodge, manager of the first cotton factory in Connecticut and one of the founders of the New York Bible Society and the New York Tract Society, was born in town
- Waldo Hutchins, a U.S. Representative and member of Democratic Party from New York
- Susan A. Hutchinson (1873–1945), librarian of the Brooklyn Museum in New York
- Samuel J. May, minister and supporter of Prudence Crandall's boarding school for African American females
- Elijah Paine (1757–1842), a Federalist U.S. senator from Vermont (1795–1801) was born in town
- Adelaide Ward Peckham (1848–1944), bacteriologist, born in town
- Israel Putnam, a general in the Revolutionary War and a legendary figure in his day, had a farm in Brooklyn, where he died in 1790, and was buried in an above-ground tomb in Brooklyn's South Cemetery
- John Day Putnam, Democratic member of the Wisconsin State Assembly
- Michael Bruce Ross (1959–2005) was a serial killer raised on a farm near Brooklyn

== Climate ==
The climate in this area has mild differences between highs and lows, and there is adequate rainfall year-round. According to the Köppen Climate Classification system, Brooklyn has a marine west coast climate, abbreviated "Cfb" on climate maps.
