= Charles Backus Goddard =

American politician

Charles Backus Goddard (October 6, 1796 – February 1, 1864) was an American lawyer and politician.

He was the son of Calvin Goodard and Alice (Hart) Goddard, and was born in Plainfield, Connecticut, October 6, 1796.

He graduated from Yale College in 1814. After studying Law with his father in Norwich, Connecticut, and with Judge Griswold in Lyme, Connecticut, he was admitted to the Connecticut bar, and went soon afterwards to Zanesville, Ohio, where he continued to reside in the uninterrupted practice of his profession until his death.

He was admitted to the bar in Ohio in 1817, (the year of his arrival) at Gallipolis, Ohio. He was twice elected to the Ohio House of Representatives and twice to the Ohio Senate. He was Speaker of the Senate during one term.

In 1820, he married Harriet Munro, daughter of Daniel Convers, of Zanesville, who, with seven children and nephew Calvin G. Child, survived him. He died in Zanesville, Ohio, February 1, 1864, aged 67. He outlived his brother in law Asa Child
