= Calvin Goddard =

Calvin Goddard may refer to:

- Calvin Hooker Goddard (1891–1955), forensic expert and ballistics pioneer
- Calvin Goddard (politician) (1768–1842), United States Representative from Connecticut

== See also ==
- Calvin G. Child (Calvin Goddard Child, 1834–1880), judge and US attorney, grandson of the politician
