= Lloyd S. Nelson Award =

Journal of Quality Technology annual award

The Lloyd S. Nelson Award is an annual award presented by the editorial review board of the Journal of Quality Technology (JQT), a quarterly peer-reviewed journal published by the American Society for Quality (ASQ). The award recognizes the paper published in the JQT judged to have the "greatest immediate impact to practitioners" in the field of quality control and applied statistics.

== History and Namesake ==
The award is named in honor of Dr. Lloyd S. Nelson (1922–2013), an American statistician and educator who was influential in developing and promoting statistical methods for quality improvement. Nelson was the founding editor of the Journal of Quality Technology, a publication dedicated to making technical statistical tools accessible for industrial application. He established the journal in 1969 by leading the initiative to split ASQ's flagship publication, Industrial Quality Control, into two separate journals: the general interest magazine Quality Progress and the more technical Journal of Quality Technology. Nelson is also known for formalizing the Nelson rules, a set of tests used to detect "special causes" of variation in statistical process control charts.

== Criteria and Selection ==
The winning paper is selected by the JQT editorial review board based on criteria prioritizing real-world utility and accessibility for professional practitioners. The evaluation criteria include:

- Ease of adoption: the contribution can be used immediately by practitioners.
- Applicability: the contribution can be used across a wide variety of disciplines and industries.
- Resources: availability of accompanying source code or tables to ease implementation.
- Relevance: the paper is readable and accessible to a broad audience.
- Recognition: the paper continues Nelson's legacy of focusing on practical application.

The award is typically presented at the annual Fall Technical Conference (FTC), which is co-sponsored by the ASQ Statistics Division and the American Statistical Association's Section on Physical and Engineering Sciences.

== Recipients ==
Notable recipients of the award include:

- 2004: Robert Mee, for his paper Efficient two-level designs for estimating all main effects and two-factor interactions.
- 2017: Peter Goos and Steven G. Gilmour, for their paper Testing for lack of fit in blocked, split-plot, and other multi-stratum designs.
- 2018: Anh Tuan Bui and Daniel W. Apley, for their paper Monitoring for changes in the nature of stochastic textured surfaces.
- 2023: Daniel A. Cole, Robert B. Gramacy, James E. Warner, Geoffrey F. Bomarito, Patrick E. Leser, and William P. Leser for their paper Entropy-based adaptive design for contour finding and estimating reliability.
- 2025: Yulin An, Xueqi Zhao, and Enrique del Castillo for their paper Practical Implementation of an End-to-end methodology for SPC of 3-D part Geometry: a case study.

Note: the years given above correspond to the paper's year of publication, not the year in which the award was bestowed.
