= Norwich, Connecticut =

City in Connecticut, United States

Norwich
- City
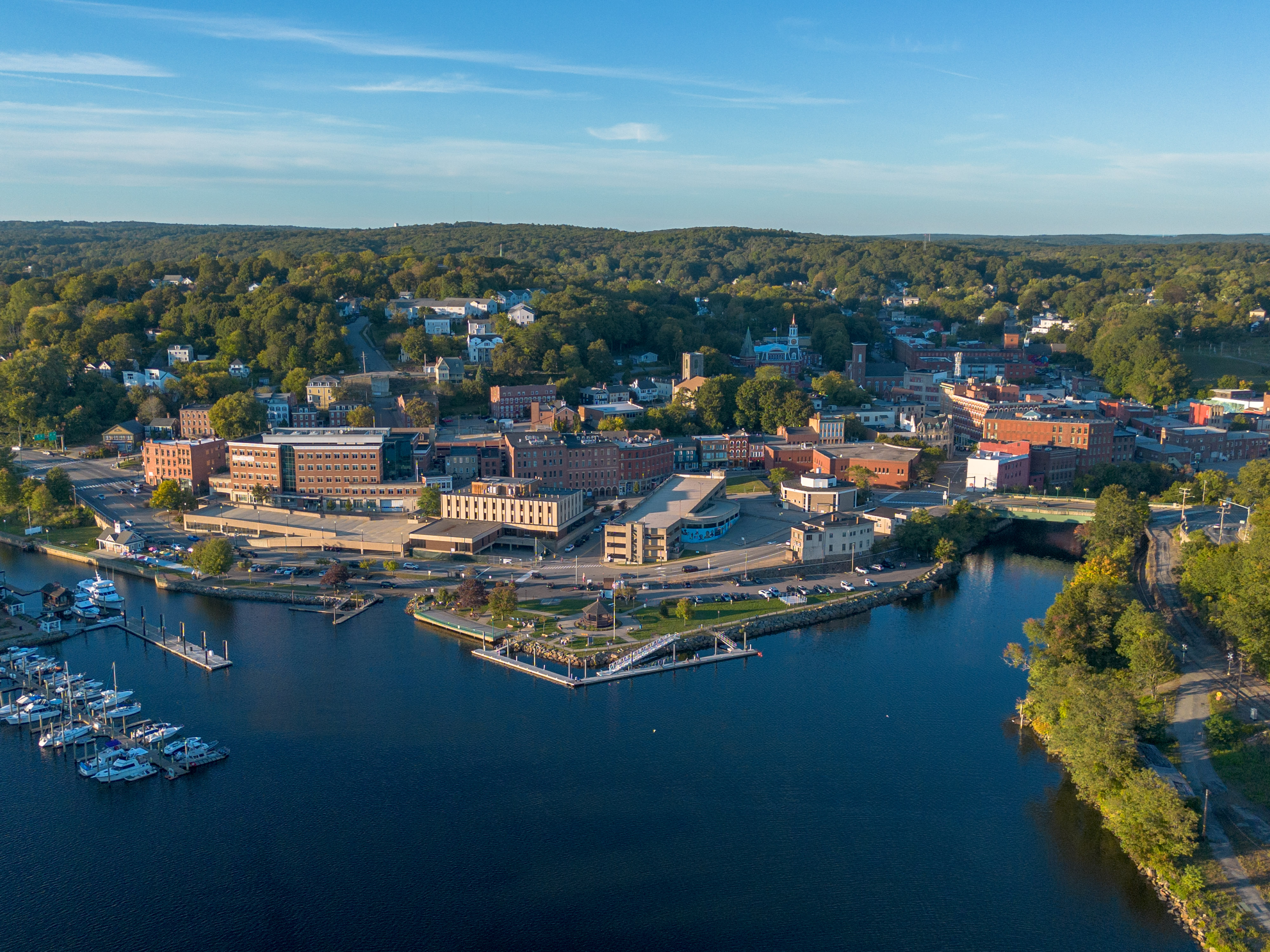
- Norwich in 2025

- Seal
- Nickname: The Rose Of New England
- Coordinates: 41°33′01″N 72°05′15″W
- Country: United States
- U.S. state: Connecticut
- County: New London
- Region: Southeastern CT
- Settled: 1659
- Incorporated (city): 1784
- Consolidated: 1952
- Named for: Norwichtown

Government
  - Type: Council-manager
  - City council: Swarnjit Singh, Mayor; Joseph A. DeLucia, Council President Pro Tem; Bill Nash; Shiela Hayes; Peter A. Nystrom; Zato Kadambaya; Jill Zuccardy
  - City manager: John Salomone

Area
  - City: 29.41 sq mi (76.16 km^{2})
  - Land: 28.06 sq mi (72.68 km^{2})
  - Water: 1.34 sq mi (3.48 km^{2})
  - Urban: 123.1 sq mi (318.7 km^{2})
- Elevation: 56 ft (17 m)

Population (2020)
  - City: 40,125
  - Density: 1,430/sq mi (552.1/km^{2})
  - Metro: 274,055

GDP
  - Metro: $22.049 billion (2022)
- Time zone: UTC−5 (Eastern)
  - Summer (DST): UTC−4 (Eastern)
- ZIP Codes: 06360, 06380, 06389
- Area codes: 860/959
- FIPS code: 09-56200
- GNIS feature ID: 0209410
- Website: www.norwichct.gov

Norwich (/ˈnɔːrwɪtʃ/ NOR-wich) is a city in New London County, Connecticut, United States. The Yantic, Shetucket, and Quinebaug Rivers flow into the city and form its harbor, from which the Thames River flows south to Long Island Sound. The city is part of the Southeastern Connecticut Planning Region. The population was 40,125 at the 2020 United States Census. The Norwich–New London metropolitan area includes 21 towns and 274,055 people.

== History ==
The town of Norwich was founded in 1659, on the site of what is now the neighborhood of Norwichtown, by settlers from Saybrook Colony led by Major John Mason, James Fitch, and Lieutenant Francis Griswold. They purchased the land "nine miles square" that became Norwich from Mohegan Sachem Uncas. One of the co-founders of Norwich was Thomas Leffingwell, who rescued Uncas when surrounded by his Narragansett tribesmen, and whose son established the Leffingwell Inn. In 1668, a wharf was established at Yantic Cove. Settlement was primarily in the three-mile (4.8 km) area around the Norwichtown Green. The 69 founding families soon divided up the land in the Norwichtown vicinity for farms and businesses.

Until 1786, the town of Norwich encompassed what became known as the "Nine Mile Square". Eight Religious Societies were created over the course of the 18th century and in 1786 these were mostly split into new towns, while the Long Society was merged into Preston, Connecticut.

Society Number	Society Name	Founding Year	Contemporary Town(s)
First Society	Norwich	1660	Norwich
Second Society	West Farms	1716	Franklin
Third Society	Newent	1718	Lisbon
Fourth Society	New Concord	1737	Bozrah
Fifth Society	Long or East	1726	Griswold, Norwich, Preston
Sixth Society	Chelsea	1751	Norwich
Seventh Society	Hanover	1761	Canterbury, Lisbon, Sprague, Scotland
Eighth Society	Pautipaug	1758/1761	Franklin, Sprague

By 1694, the public landing built at the head of the Thames River allowed ships to unload goods at the harbor; the harbor area is known as the Chelsea neighborhood. The distance from the port to Norwichtown was served by the East and West Roads, which became Broadway and Washington Street. The original center of the town was a neighborhood now called Norwichtown, an inland location chosen to be the center of a primarily agricultural community. By the late 18th century, shipping at the harbor became far more important than farming, especially when industrial mills began manufacturing on the three tributary rivers. By the early 19th century, the center of Norwich had effectively moved to the Chelsea neighborhood. The official buildings of the city, such as the city hall, courts, and post office, and all the large 19th-century urban blocks, were located in the harbor area. The former center is now called Norwichtown to distinguish it from the current city.

Norwich merchants were shipping goods directly from England, but the Stamp Act 1765 forced Norwich to become more self-sufficient. Large mills and factories sprang up at the falls on the rivers which traverse the town, the largest of which was the Ponemah Mill in the Taftville neighborhood. The ship captains of Norwich and New London were skillful at avoiding Imperial taxation during peacetime and were later just as successful eluding warships during the American Revolution. Norwich supported the cause for independence by supplying soldiers, ships, and munitions, and it was also a center of activity for the Sons of Liberty.

The Oxford English Dictionary attests the first recorded use of the word "Hello" to The Norwich Courier on October 18, 1826. Regular steamship service between New York and Boston helped Norwich to prosper as a shipping center through the early part of the 19th century. During the Civil War, Norwich once again rallied and saw the growth of its textile, armaments, and specialty item manufacturing. This was also spurred by the building of the Norwich and Worcester Railroad in 1832–1837, bringing goods and people in and out of Norwich. By the 1870s, the Springfield and New London Railroad was also running trains through Norwich.

In 1892, the city's first electric trolleys started service to the area and to some cities, including New London, Willimantic, Putnam, and Westerly, Rhode Island. The town and city of Norwich were consolidated in 1952.

== Geography ==
According to the United States Census Bureau, the city has a total area of 29.5 square miles (76.4 km^{2}), of which 28.3 sq mi (73.4 km^{2}) is land and 1.2 sq mi (3.0 km^{2}) (3.87%) is water.

=== Climate ===
Climate data for Norwich, Connecticut (1991–2020 normals, extremes 1952–present)
Month	Jan	Feb	Mar	Apr	May	Jun	Jul	Aug	Sep	Oct	Nov	Dec	Year
Record high °F (°C)	70 (21)	72 (22)	85 (29)	94 (34)	98 (37)	101 (38)	101 (38)	102 (39)	101 (38)	88 (31)	80 (27)	77 (25)	102 (39)
Mean maximum °F (°C)	57.9 (14.4)	59.1 (15.1)	67.6 (19.8)	79.5 (26.4)	88.8 (31.6)	92.4 (33.6)	95.0 (35.0)	92.8 (33.8)	88.3 (31.3)	79.3 (26.3)	70.4 (21.3)	61.5 (16.4)	97.0 (36.1)
Mean daily maximum °F (°C)	37.7 (3.2)	40.5 (4.7)	47.8 (8.8)	59.3 (15.2)	69.9 (21.1)	78.4 (25.8)	84.1 (28.9)	82.6 (28.1)	75.5 (24.2)	63.9 (17.7)	53.0 (11.7)	43.2 (6.2)	61.3 (16.3)
Daily mean °F (°C)	29.5 (−1.4)	31.7 (−0.2)	38.6 (3.7)	49.2 (9.6)	59.4 (15.2)	68.4 (20.2)	74.4 (23.6)	72.6 (22.6)	65.2 (18.4)	53.8 (12.1)	43.6 (6.4)	35.1 (1.7)	51.8 (11.0)
Mean daily minimum °F (°C)	21.2 (−6.0)	22.9 (−5.1)	29.4 (−1.4)	39.1 (3.9)	48.9 (9.4)	58.5 (14.7)	64.8 (18.2)	62.7 (17.1)	54.9 (12.7)	43.6 (6.4)	34.3 (1.3)	27.0 (−2.8)	42.3 (5.7)
Mean minimum °F (°C)	2.6 (−16.3)	6.4 (−14.2)	13.6 (−10.2)	27.2 (−2.7)	35.7 (2.1)	45.5 (7.5)	53.9 (12.2)	51.3 (10.7)	40.0 (4.4)	29.3 (−1.5)	20.0 (−6.7)	11.5 (−11.4)	0.1 (−17.7)
Record low °F (°C)	−21 (−29)	−17 (−27)	−1 (−18)	8 (−13)	26 (−3)	33 (1)	43 (6)	40 (4)	29 (−2)	18 (−8)	6 (−14)	−13 (−25)	−21 (−29)
Average precipitation inches (mm)	3.89 (99)	3.75 (95)	5.09 (129)	4.71 (120)	3.64 (92)	4.27 (108)	3.63 (92)	4.41 (112)	4.79 (122)	4.86 (123)	4.17 (106)	4.97 (126)	52.18 (1,325)
Average snowfall inches (cm)	9.0 (23)	7.1 (18)	5.0 (13)	0.8 (2.0)	0.0 (0.0)	0.0 (0.0)	0.0 (0.0)	0.0 (0.0)	0.0 (0.0)	0.0 (0.0)	0.3 (0.76)	5.6 (14)	27.8 (71)
Average precipitation days (≥ 0.01 in)	10.8	9.6	10.4	10.8	11.3	10.1	9.4	8.7	8.6	10.3	9.3	10.9	120.2
Average snowy days (≥ 0.1 in)	3.5	3.0	2.0	0.2	0.0	0.0	0.0	0.0	0.0	0.0	0.2	2.4	11.3
Source: NOAA

=== Neighborhoods ===
Several Norwich neighborhoods maintain independent identities and are recognized by official signs marking their boundaries. Neighborhoods of Norwich are Norwichtown, Bean Hill, Yantic, Taftville, Greeneville, Occum, East Great Plains, Thamesville, Laurel Hill and Chelsea (the original "downtown" area.)

== Demographics ==
Historical population
Year	Pop.	±%
1756	5,540	—
1774	7,327	+32.3%
1782	7,325	−0.0%
1800	3,476	−52.5%
1810	2,976	−14.4%
1820	2,983	+0.2%
1830	3,135	+5.1%
1840	4,200	+34.0%
1850	6,139	+46.2%
1860	14,048	+128.8%
1870	16,653	+18.5%
1880	15,112	−9.3%
1890	16,156	+6.9%
1900	17,251	+6.8%
1910	20,367	+18.1%
1920	22,304	+9.5%
1930	23,021	+3.2%
1940	23,652	+2.7%
1950	23,429	−0.9%
1960	38,506	+64.4%
1970	41,739	+8.4%
1980	38,074	−8.8%
1990	37,391	−1.8%
2000	36,117	−3.4%
2010	40,493	+12.1%
2020	40,125	−0.9%
Population 1756–2010

=== 2020 census ===
As of the 2020 census, Norwich had a population of 40,125. The median age was 39.1 years. 21.0% of residents were under the age of 18 and 16.1% of residents were 65 years of age or older. For every 100 females there were 93.9 males, and for every 100 females age 18 and over there were 91.9 males age 18 and over.

97.1% of residents lived in urban areas, while 2.9% lived in rural areas.

There were 16,816 households in Norwich, of which 28.2% had children under the age of 18 living in them. Of all households, 33.0% were married-couple households, 23.0% were households with a male householder and no spouse or partner present, and 34.1% were households with a female householder and no spouse or partner present. About 33.4% of all households were made up of individuals and 12.8% had someone living alone who was 65 years of age or older.

There were 18,769 housing units, of which 10.4% were vacant. The homeowner vacancy rate was 2.5% and the rental vacancy rate was 7.6%.

Racial composition as of the 2020 census
Race	Number	Percent
White	23,177	57.8%
Black or African American	5,036	12.6%
American Indian and Alaska Native	381	0.9%
Asian	2,887	7.2%
Native Hawaiian and Other Pacific Islander	63	0.2%
Some other race	3,464	8.6%
Two or more races	5,117	12.8%
Hispanic or Latino (of any race)	7,727	19.3%

=== 2000 census ===
As of the 2000 census, there were 36,117 people, 15,091 households, and 9,069 families residing in the city. The population density was 1,274.7 inhabitants per square mile (492.2/km^{2}). There were 16,600 housing units at an average density of 585.9 per square mile (226.2/km^{2}).

Twenty-nine percent of households had children under the age of 18 living with them, 40.7% were married couples living together, 15.0% had a female householder with no husband present, and 39.9% were non-families. Thirty-two percent of all households were made up of individuals, and 12.5% had someone living alone who was 65 years of age or older. The average household size was 2.34 and the average family size was 2.96.

In the city, the age distribution of the population shows 24.1% under the age of 18, 8.9% from 18 to 24, 30.2% from 25 to 44, 21.5% from 45 to 64, and 15.4% who were 65 years of age or older. The median age was 37 years. For every 100 females, there were 90.5 males. For every 100 females age 18 and over, there were 87.3 males.

=== 2012 estimates ===
The 2012 median income for a household in the city was $51,300. Fifteen percent of the population were below the poverty line.

== Arts and culture ==
The Slater Memorial Museum, located on the campus of the Norwich Free Academy, is named for John Fox Slater (1815−1884), corporator of The Norwich Free Academy for twenty years. The museum has grown to include the "Art of Five Continents"—North and South America, Europe, Asia, and Africa. Of particular interest are the Vanderpoel Collection of Asian Art, the Paul Zimmerman Collection of African and Oceanic Art, and a collection of 19th-century American paintings. Another wing of the museum displays souvenirs from the Slater family's circumnavigation of the globe.

== Sports ==
The AA Eastern League Connecticut Defenders, previously the Norwich Navigators, were a farm team of the San Francisco Giants and they played at Senator Thomas J. Dodd Memorial Stadium from both's inception in 1995 until the team announced its move to Richmond, Virginia for the 2010 season, where they are now known as the Richmond Flying Squirrels. However, starting in 2010, Dodd Stadium became the home to the Connecticut Tigers (formerly the Oneonta Tigers, now named Norwich Sea Unicorns) in the Class-A short-season New York–Penn League. The ESPN mini-series The Bronx Is Burning was filmed at Dodd Stadium.

== Parks and recreation ==
=== Mohegan Park ===
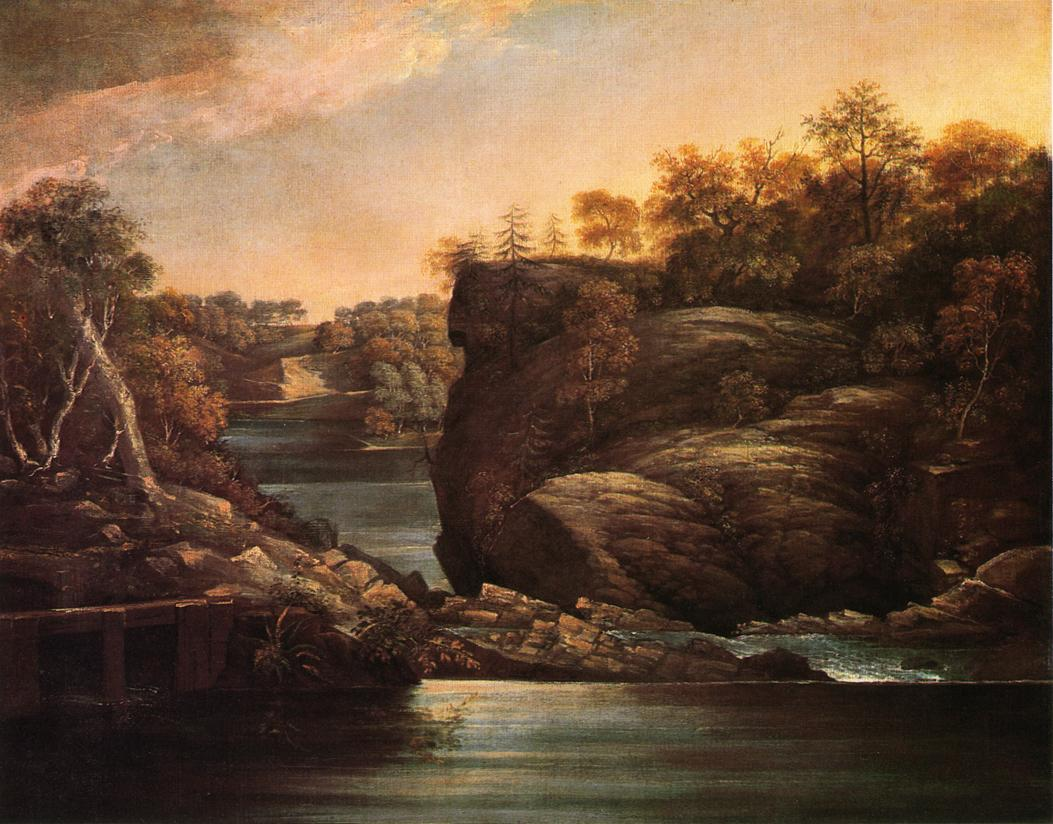
Norwich Falls by John Trumbull, 1806

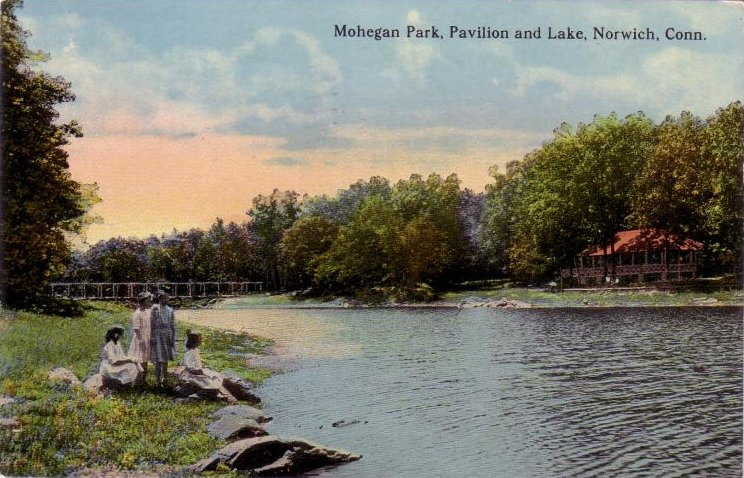
Pavilion and lake, 1912

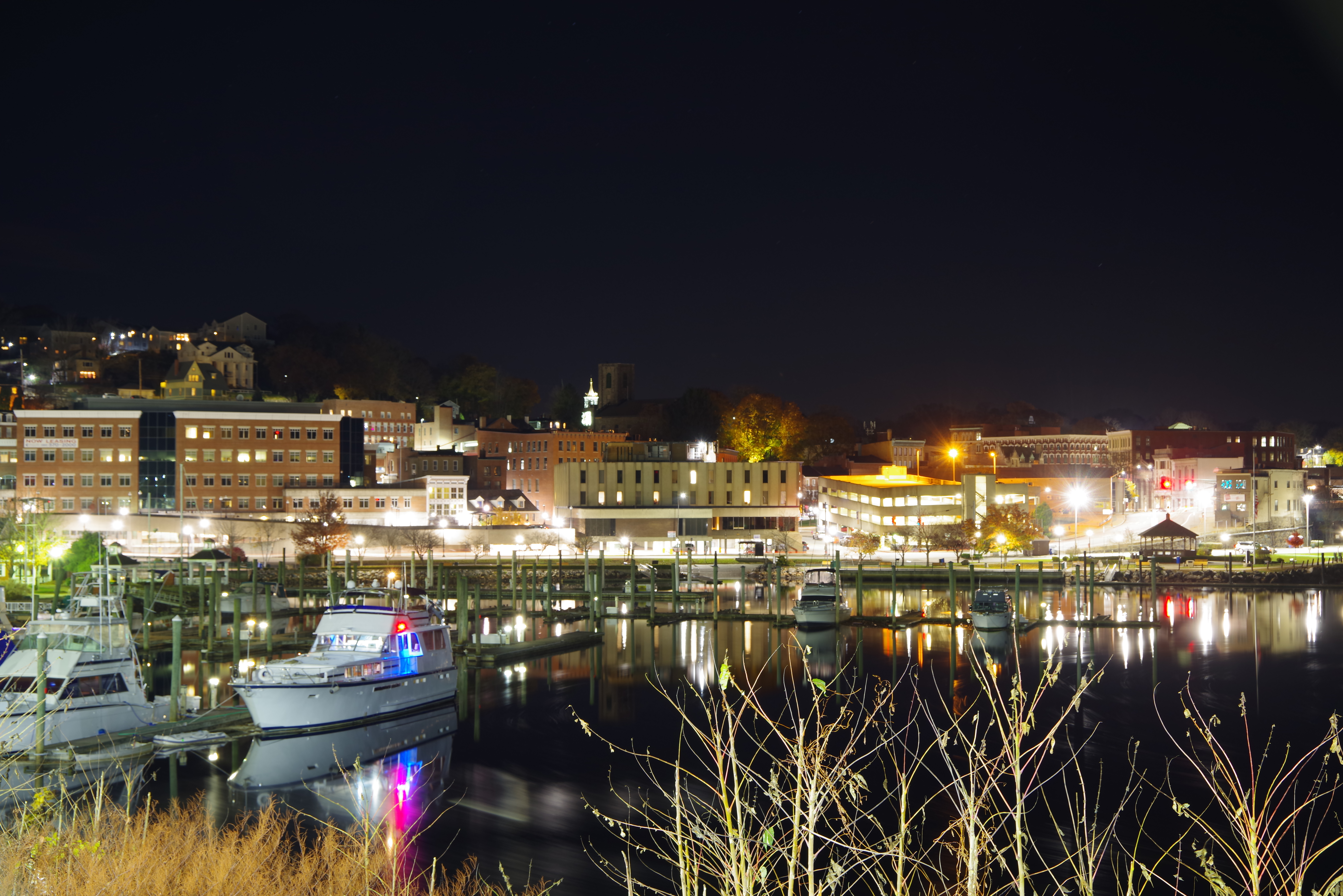
Norwich, 2018

This forested area is Norwich's largest park. The park's property contains numerous hiking and biking trails, picnic tables, grills, pavilions for rent, a beach, basketball courts, a Mohegan monument, fountain and playgrounds. The Rose Garden at the entrance on Judd Road contains over a hundred varieties of roses and is a popular site for weddings. Many of the hiking trails are used by the Norwich Free Academy cross country team for practices, and in 2006 the team volunteered to improve the condition of trails. 5K "fun runs" are held in the park on Thursdays during the summer. As of 2009, the running course has been redesigned to incorporate much of the trails.

The Park Center contains Spaulding Pond, the square, fountain, and Mohegan monument, both playgrounds and a dog pound run by the Norwich Police Department. The Park Center has declined somewhat. The zoo, reptile house, and concession stand have been closed for over a decade. However, much has been done to improve the appearance of the remaining park.

Spaulding Pond, the main body of water in Mohegan Park, is held back by an earthworks dam, across which is a path bordered by pergolas and flowering plants. On March 6, 1963, long-term saturation of the over-100-year-old earthen content, along with unchecked shrub and tree growth, severely weakened the structural content of the dam and caused the waters of Spaulding Pond to burst forth into the city, causing the Great Flood of Norwich, elegantly chronicled in the 2013 book A Swift and Deadly Maelstrom; The Great Norwich Flood of 1963. The break and subsequent flood flow pulverized houses with its large ice content, over-ran streets and cars while destroying the eastern half of the Turner-Stanton Mill, situated in the flood's direct path on Centennial Square. It was there that the building collapsed, claiming the lives of six of the seven total who would die that night while causing over six million dollars in damage. Mohegan Park also contains another, smaller pond, called The Skating Pond which is southeast of the main pond. This pond, which had always been designed as an overflow spillway for Spaulding Pond and, when frozen in the winter provided a wonderful ice skating area for the local youth, thus its sobriquet, was re-designed as part of Norwich's long-term flood plan in 1968 and currently still serves as a surge overflow volume for the upgraded Spaulding Pond Dam, although it is no longer open for public use.

=== Ice rink ===
The Norwich Municipal Ice Rink has a 200' × 85' National Hockey League regulation ice surface, four large locker rooms and other amenities. Established in 1995, the Rose City Warriors are Norwich's Senior Women's Ice Hockey Team and a number of local high school ice hockey teams call the Rink home as well.

== Government ==
The city elects a Mayor, who presides over the City Council, which includes six other members, all elected at large. The Mayor serves a maximum of two four-year terms; the council members serve two-year terms. The council appoints the Town and City Clerk, a City Manager who acts as chief executive officer of the city government, the city Planning Commission, and Zoning Board of Appeals.

== Education ==
Elementary and middle school residents are zoned to Norwich Public Schools. The middle schools of Norwich are Teachers' Memorial Global Studies Middle School and Kelly STEAM Magnet Middle School. Norwich is also home to the Integrated Day Charter School, an alternative to the area of public schools. Despite Norwich Public Schools serving the district, since 2007 NPS has not operated a high school after Norwich High School was closed and repurposed.

The Norwich Free Academy is the primary high school for students living in Norwich and several surrounding towns, including Bozrah, Canterbury, Franklin, Lisbon, Preston, Sprague, and Voluntown. The Norwich Free Academy was incorporated in 1855 by an act of the Connecticut Legislature, and operates as a privately endowed independent school governed by its board of trustees and funded by private, municipal, and state sources. In 2006, Sidney Frank donated $12 million to the Norwich Free Academy which resulted in the campus's newest building being named after him: the Sidney E. Frank Center for Visual and Performing Arts.

Norwich Technical High School, a Connecticut Technical High School System School, also serves the area. This school is a public option to those within the Norwich area, and many other towns surrounding Norwich. To those within the Norwich area, transportation is provided by Norwich Public Schools via the same buses that serve Norwich Free Academy in the morning, and in the afternoon students are transported to Norwich Free Academy to use their buses to return home.

Three Rivers Community College also serves the region.

Norwich skyline

== Economy ==
=== Top employers ===
Top employers in Norwich according to the town's 2022 Comprehensive Annual Financial Report:

#	Employer	# of Employees
1	William W. Backus Hospital	1,895
2	City of Norwich	1,212
3	State of Connecticut	944
4	Bob's Discount Furniture	553
5	Norwich Free Academy	345
6	U.S. Food Services	300
7	United Community & Family Services	276
8	Nordson EFD	270
9	The American Group	219
10	ShopRite	180

== Infrastructure ==
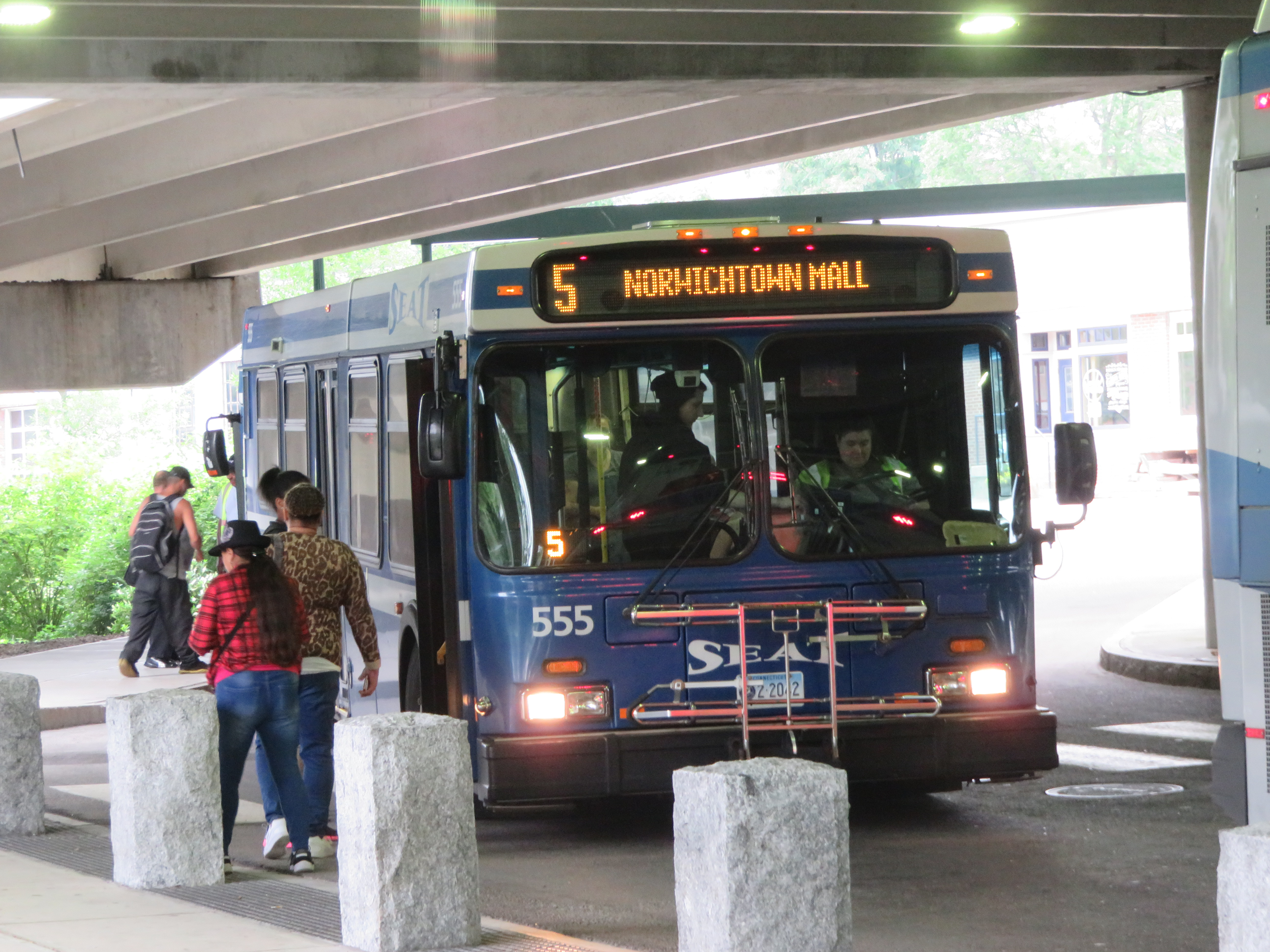
Commuters boarding buses at the Norwich Transportation Center.

=== Transportation ===
Local public transportation in Norwich is provided by Southeast Area Transit (SEAT). The main bus hub, the Norwich Transportation Center, is located on Holly Hock Island next to the downtown area. This station is also served by the Windham Region Transit District with service to and from Willimantic, CT. Norwich is also served by the Northeastern Connecticut Transit District with service to and from Putnam, CT.

Historically, the city held a railroad stop at its downtown station, which at one time was an office for The Norwich Bulletin. In the past, the city was served by the Norwich and Worcester Railroad, which today is still operated as a freight railroad, the Providence and Worcester Railroad.

The nearest passenger rail station to Norwich is New London Union Station in New London, CT. The nearest options for air travel are Bradley International Airport in Windsor Locks, CT, and Rhode Island T. F. Green International Airport in Providence, RI. Both of which are located 55–65 minutes away by vehicle. Up until the mid-2000s, there was a closer airport with commercial air service, Groton-New London Airport.

In recent years, there have been discussions and proposals involving restoring passenger rail service to Norwich along the New England Central Railroad, providing service from New London, CT, through Norwich up to Brattleboro, VT. The most recent and ongoing proposal is the Central Corridor Rail Line.

=== Utilities ===
Norwich's electric, natural gas, water, and sewage systems are owned by the City of Norwich and operated through Norwich Public Utilities (NPU). It is the only municipality in the state of Connecticut to have its own gas distribution system, and one of five municipalities in the state to have its own electric distribution grid. Each year, NPU returns 10% of its revenue to the City of Norwich.

== Notable people ==
- Andrew Adgate (1762–1793), musician, born in Norwich
- Richard Albertine (1944–2016), photographer, born in Norwich
- Christopher Anvil (1925–2009), science fiction author
- Benedict Arnold (1741–1801), born in Norwich, American Revolutionary War general and later British defector; a commemorative plaque is on the lot where his house used to stand; city library has a prominent portrait of Arnold on its north wall
- Hannah Arnold (1708–1758), born in Norwich, mother of Benedict Arnold
- Isaac Backus (1724–1806), a delegate to the First Continental Congress, born in the city
- Isaac H. Bromley (1833–1899), born in Norwich; lawyer, editor, politician, railroad director, and humorist
- Allyn L. Brown (1883–1973), Chief Justice of the Connecticut Supreme Court (1950–1953), was born in the city and graduated Norwich Free Academy
- William Alfred Buckingham (1804–1875), Mayor of Norwich, 41st governor of Connecticut, and United States Senator
- Oliver A. Caswell, Wisconsin politician, born in the city
- Asa Child (1798–1858), United States Attorney for the District of Connecticut under President Jackson
- Calvin G. Child (1834–1880), United States Attorney for the District of Connecticut, and a Norwich City Judge
- Benjamin Church (1734–1776), surgeon general of the Continental Army, suspected of spying for the British, was confined in the city
- Elisha Clark (1752–1838), American Revolutionary War veteran
- Richard Falley Cleveland (1804–1853), born and raised in Norwich, Christian minister known as the father of President Grover Cleveland
- Margaret Coit (1919–2003), historian, born in the city
- Erastus Corning (1794–1872), businessman and politician, born in the city
- Rajai Davis (born 1980), Major League Baseball outfielder
- Roger Wilson Dennis (1902–1996), American plein air impressionist painter and art conservator
- Costa Dillon (born 1953) filmmaker, creator of Attack of the Killer Tomatoes.
- Thomas J. Dodd (1907–1971), U.S. Senator and Representative; father of U.S. Senator Christopher J. Dodd, was born in the city
- Arielle Dombasle (born Arielle Sonnery de Fromental in 1958 in Norwich), singer and actress working mostly in French films
- Terence P. Finnegan (1904–1990), Chief of Chaplains of the U.S. Air Force
- Lafayette S. Foster (1806–1880), U.S. Senator and 57th President Pro Tempore of the United States Senate; died in the city
- Clarke Fraser (1920–2014), Canadian medical geneticist, student of congenital malformations, was born in Norwich
- Jonas Galusha (1753–1834), Governor of Vermont for two terms in the early 19th century; born in the city
- Charlotte Perkins Gilman (1860–1935), author and social reformer, lived for a short time in the city
- Daniel Coit Gilman (1831–1908), educator, college president, foundation president
- Calvin Goddard (1768–1842), former mayor of Norwich, Judge, and Senator
- Roger Griswold (1762–1812), Governor of Connecticut, practiced law for a time in Norwich
- Galusha A. Grow (1822–1907), speaker of the U.S. House of Representatives from 1861 to 1863, studied law in the city
- Benjamin Hanks (1755–1824), goldsmith, instrument maker, first maker of bronze cannons and church bells in America
- Benjamin Huntington (1736–1800), delegate to the Continental Congress and later a Congressman, resident of the city
- Ebenezer Huntington (1754–1834), member of the United States House of Representatives, 1817–1819
- Samuel Huntington (1731–1796), delegate to the Second Continental Congress and signer of the Declaration of Independence; first President of the United States, under the Articles of Confederation
- Helen Kinne (1861–1917), Home economist, college professor
- Samuel Kirkland (1741–1808), Presbyterian missionary among the Oneida and Tuscarora people; founder (in 1793) of the Hamilton-Oneida Academy (later Hamilton College), was born in the city
- Paul Konerko (born 1976), former MLB player
- Wally Lamb (born 1950), author of She's Come Undone and I Know This Much Is True; director of the Writing Center at the Norwich Free Academy in the city from 1989 to 1998
- Berel Lang (1933–2025), professor of philosophy emeritus and an author.
- Edwin H. Land (1909–1991), inventor of the Polaroid camera
- James Lanman (1767–1841), United States Senator (1819–1825)
- Cato Mead (c. 1761–1846), African-American Revolutionary War veteran
- Steve Merrill, (1946–2020), 77th governor of New Hampshire
- Miantonomoh (c. 1565–1643), chief of the Narraganset tribe, captured and executed by the Mohegan chief Uncas with a tomahawk in Norwich
- Lloyd S. Nelson (1922–2013), statistician and creator of the Nelson rules
- Elisha Perkins (1741–1799), popular quack doctor whose magnetic therapy "Perkins Tractors" (made up of two steel and brass rods with points at the ends) convinced even George Washington to buy a set
- Simeon Perkins (1735–1812), Nova Scotia merchant, diarist, and politician; outfitted Loyalist privateers during the American War for Independence; born and raised in this city until moving to Liverpool, Nova Scotia with the New England Planters
- Bela Pratt, sculptor, born in Norwich in 1867
- E. Annie Proulx, journalist and author; born in 1935 in the city
- Edith Roosevelt (1861–1948), second wife of Theodore Roosevelt, born in the city
- Ellis Ruley (1882–1959), African-American folk artist
- Albert Schatz (1929–2005), microbiologist who discovered streptomycin
- Lottie B. Scott (born 1936), civic leader and civil rights advocate, lived in Norwich since 1957
- William Albert Setchell (1864–1943), botanist and UC Berkeley professor, born in the city
- Matt Shaughnessy (born 1986), football defensive end for the Oakland Raiders of the National Football League, graduate of Norwich Free Academy
- Charles Sholes (1816–1867), Wisconsin politician, born in the city
- Lydia Sigourney (1791–1865), extremely popular poet from the early-to-mid-19th century, born in the city
- John Fox Slater (1815–1884), industrialist and philanthropist, founder of million-dollar Slater Fund for the Education of the Southern Freedmen in 1882
- Horace Smith (1808–1893), partnered with Daniel B. Wesson in Norwich in the early 1850s to develop the first repeating rifle, known as the Volcanic rifle; the two founded Smith & Wesson in 1852
- James Lindsay Smith (c. 1816–c. 1883), African American slave narrative author and minister
- Sarah Lanman Smith (1802–1836), American Christian missionary, memoirist, school founder
- Albert H. Tracy (1793–1859), former US Congressman
- Phineas L. Tracy (1786–1876), former US Congressman
- Dean Trantalis (born 1953), mayor of Fort Lauderdale, Florida
- Leonard Troland (1889–1932) Physicist, psychologist and psychical researcher, specializing in perception of colors, chief engineer of Technicolor Corporation. Proposed that genes originated from enzyme-like autocatalysts, calling them "genetic enzymes" and that the earliest life forms were purely auto-catalytic substance.
- Michael van der Veen (born 1963), lawyer who represented Donald Trump during his second impeachment trial
- Ariel. L. Varges (1890–1972), newsreel cameraman and war photographer, died in Norwich
- John T. Wait (1811–1899), Connecticut politician and lawyer, U.S. Representative from 1876 to 1887
- Henry S. Walbridge (1801–1869), former US Congressman
- Gordon Waller (1945–2009), member of Peter & Gordon died in the city
- Daniel B. Wesson (1825–1906), firearm designer; see Horace Smith
- Bernard Widrow (born 1929), electrical engineer
- William Woodbridge (1780–1861), Governor of Michigan, also represented the state in the U.S. Senate, was born in the city

== See also ==
- Norwich
