= Lewis E. Stanton =

American attorney

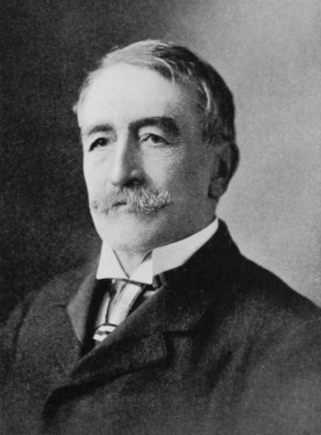

United States Attorney for the District of Connecticut
- In office 1884–1888
- President: Chester A. Arthur; Grover Cleveland
- Preceded by: Daniel Chadwick
- Succeeded by: George Griswold Sill

Connecticut General Assembly
- In office 1888–?

Personal details
- Born: Lewis Eliot Stanton; July 19, 1833 Clinton, Connecticut, US
- Died: August 28, 1916 (aged 83) Clinton, Connecticut, US
- Education: Yale (1855); Yale Law School
- Occupation: Lawyer

Lewis Eliot Stanton (July 19, 1833 – August 28, 1916) was an American attorney who served as the United States Attorney for the District of Connecticut under two presidents.

== Early life ==
Stanton was born in Clinton, Connecticut, on July 19, 1833. His father's side was descended from Thomas Stanton, one of the founders of Hartford, and his mother traced her ancestry to the Rev. John Eliot, a missionary who worked among the Indians.

He prepared for college at Bacon Academy, Colchester, and graduated from Yale University in 1855. While descended from an old New England family, his parents were poor, so he had to make his own way through law school. So after graduation he spent a short time working as a teacher in Ohio, until he made enough money to pay his way through Yale Law School. He completed his studies in the office of John S. Beach, Esq., of New Haven.

Stanton was admitted to the bar in New Haven in April 1859.

== Legal career ==
After his admission he located in Norwich and practiced law there from 1859 to 1865. In Norwich he held the office of Assistant Clerk of the Superior Court for a time, and was also recorder of the City Court. In 1865 he moved to Hartford where he lived for the rest of his life and formed a partnership with John C. Day, under the name of Day & Stanton; this partnership continued until 1871. After that Stanton opened a solo practice. He was Assistant United States District Attorney from 1870 to 1884, and United States District Attorney from 1884 to 1888. In 1888 he was a member of the General Assembly from Hartford and was chairman of the Judiciary Committee.

Stanton never wanted to handle a large number of legal matters at any one time, and it was averse to his nature to be hurried while in the practice of law. Rather, he preferred, to have only a few important cases at a time, with plenty of time to thoroughly study and understand them. He gave considerable attention to Federal matters, and it was his privilege to argue several cases in the Supreme Court.

He never married and his whole life was lived in a legal atmosphere. For years he attended the annual meeting of the American Bar Association and he knew many of the distinguished lawyers of his time. He was president for some time of the Hartford Bar Association, and he bequeathed his law library to them.

== Death ==
He was one of the oldest members of the Hartford County bar when he died at his home in Clinton on August 28, 1916.
