= J. C. Hemphill =

South Carolina journalist and editor (c. 1850 – 1927)

James Calvin Hemphill
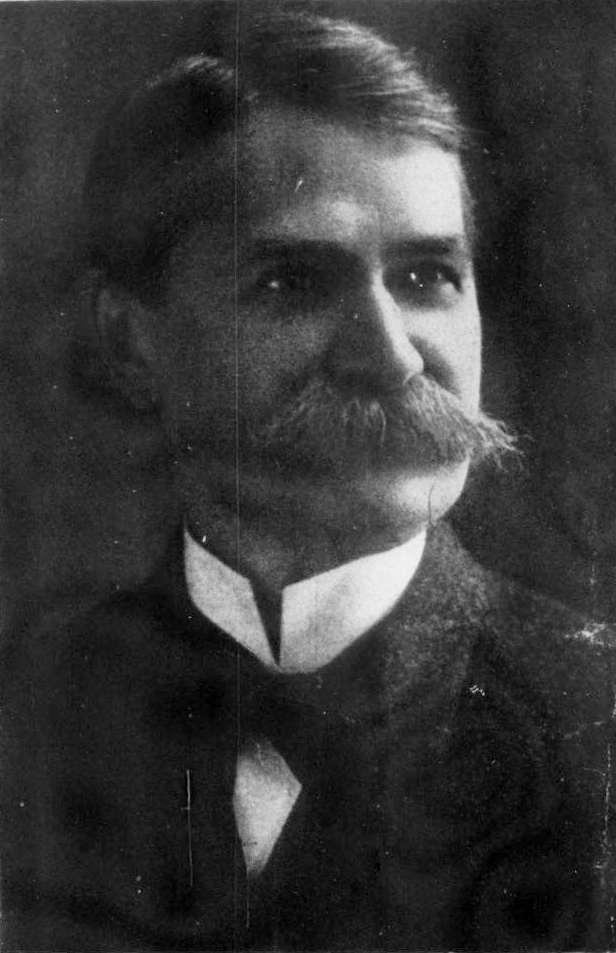
- Born: c.1850
- Died: November 20, 1927

James Calvin Hemphill (c. 1850 – November 20, 1927) was a journalist and editor in the United States. During his career he edited various South Carolina newspapers, including the Richmond Times-Dispatch.

== Early life ==
He was born in Due West, South Carolina. His father was John L. Hemphill, a Presbyterian minister and professor at Erskine College.

== Career ==
In 1880, after spending time in Abbeville, South Carolina, Hemphill moved to Charlotte, North Carolina, and became a journalist at The News and Courier. In 1888, he became editor of the newspaper. He worked at the newspaper for 30 years. His editorials at The News and Courier often used humor to tackle heavy subjects, such as lynching, which he was against. After he left The News and Courier, he served as editor of the Richmond Times-Dispatch, the Spartanburg Journal (for five years) and The Charlotte Observer, where worked for a few months in 1912. He also worked for The New York Times.

He gave a November 7, 1903, talk about "Scotch-Irish Presbyterianism in history" at the centennial synod of the Associate Reformed Presbyterian Church in Winnsboro, South Carolina. In 1909, he was named the first vice president of the Associated Press. Hemphill was a regular lecturer from 1909 through 1910 at Yale University. He gave the Bromley Lecture (Isaac Hill Bromley) at Yale University April 22, 1910, titled "Some Present Day Problems of the Press". In 1911 he addressed cadets at Virginia Military Institute.

== Later life ==
In the winter of 1927, Hemphill's health began to fail. He died November 20, 1927, at his niece's house in Abbeville, South Carolina. His funeral was held at First Presbyterian Church the following day in Charlotte. His body was transported by train to Charleston, South Carolina, the following day where it was buried at Magnolia Cemetery. Upon his death, he was named one of the leading editors and columnists in the American South, second next to Henry Watterson.

== Works by Hemphill ==
- Climate, soil, and agricultural capabilities of South Carolina and Georgia Government Printing Office 1882
- A short story of the South Carolina Inter-State and West Indian Exposition
- Charleston looking to the sea a story of the Coast Defense Squadron and the Cruiser Charleston
- Men of mark in South Carolina; ideals of American life: a collection of biographies of leading men of the state 1907
