= EQA =

EQA may refer to:

- Ecuador, ITU country code
- Equivalent average (EqA), a baseball metric
- European Quality Award
- External quality assessment
- Mercedes-Benz EQA, an electric sport utility vehicle
