= Hiram Willey =

American judge and attorney (1818–1910)

Connecticut General Assembly
- In office 1847–?
- In office 1857–?
- In office 1877–?

Connecticut Senate
- In office 1859–1860

Connecticut Probate Courts Judge
- In office 1860–1861

Mayor of New London, Connecticut
- In office 1862–1865
- Preceded by: Jonathan N. Harris
- Succeeded by: Fredrick L. Allen

United States Attorney for the District of Connecticut
- In office 1861–1869
- President: Abraham Lincoln; Andrew Johnson
- Preceded by: Tilton E. Doolittle
- Succeeded by: Calvin G. Child

Connecticut Judge of Common Pleas
- In office 1870–1873

Personal details
- Born: May 23, 1818 East Haddam, Connecticut
- Died: March 8, 1910 (aged 91) Hadlyme, Connecticut
- Children: 2
- Education: Wesleyan University (1839)

Hiram Willey (May 5, 1818 – March 8, 1910) was an American attorney who served as the United States Attorney for the District of Connecticut under two presidents. He was also a judge, member of the Connecticut senate, author, and the mayor of New London, Connecticut.

== Biography ==
Hiram was born on May 5, 1818, to Eathan Allen Willey and Mary Brockway in East Haddam, Connecticut. His ancestors moved to Connecticut in 1645 and his grandfather Abraham Willey was a captain in the Revolutionary War. He was one of the first graduates of Wesleyan University of Middletown graduating in 1839. After passing the bar in 1841, he would be involved in numerous political and legal positions throughout Connecticut. He became State's Attorney; was a member of the Legislature and State Senate; Mayor of New London; Judge of Probate Court and of the Court of Common Pleas; returned to Hadlyme to reside in 1875; was lay reader in the P.E. Church of Hadlyme, member of F.& A.M.; First Grand Commander of the Encampment in New London. As the mayor of New London, he established the cities police force. In addition he wrote multiple books and was a professor at Yale.
