= Daniel Chadwick =

American attorney (1825-1884)

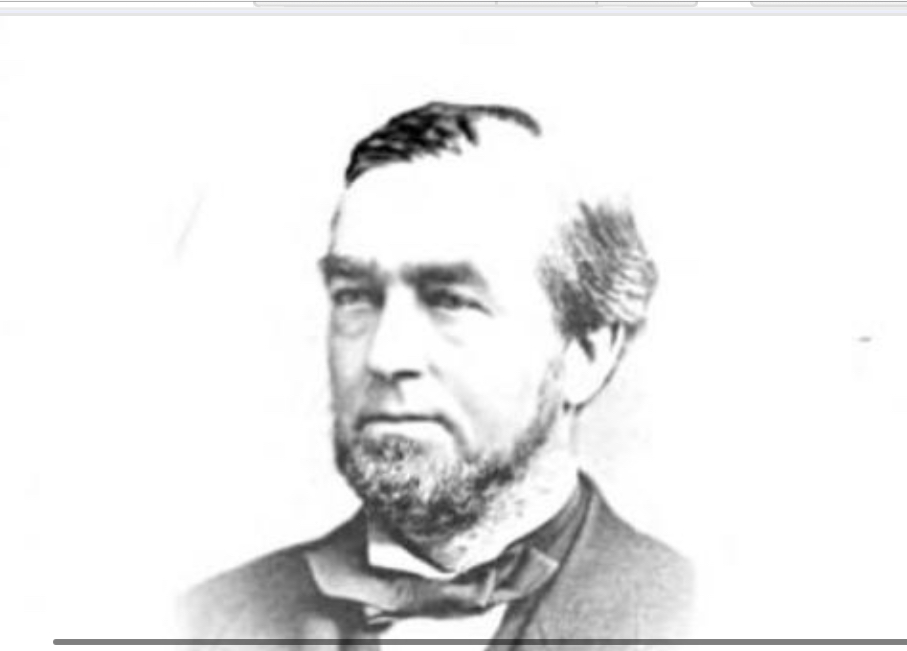

United States Attorney for the District of Connecticut
- In office September 29, 1880 – November 23, 1884
- President: Rutherford B. Hayes; James Garfield; Chester A. Arthur
- Preceded by: Calvin G. Child
- Succeeded by: Lewis E. Stanton

Personal details
- Born: January 5, 1825 Lyme, Connecticut
- Died: November 23, 1884 (aged 59) Lyme, Connecticut
- Party: Republican
- Spouse: Ellen Hayes
- Children: 4
- Education: Yale College(1845)

Daniel Chadwick (January 5, 1825 – November 23, 1884) was an American politician. He served as a Republican in Connecticut's House and Senate. He was also a state attorney for New London County for 14 years, and became U.S. attorney for Connecticut in 1880.

== Early life and education ==
Chadwick was born in Lyme, Connecticut in 1825. He was the son of Daniel and Nancy (Waite) Chadwick.

He graduated from Yale College in 1845. After graduation he studied law in Lyme with his uncle, the Hon. Henry M. Waite, and for one year with his cousin, Morrison Waite (future Chief Justice of the United States).

== Career ==
He was admitted to the bar in 1847, and at once began the practice of law in Lyme. He continued there until 1854 when he removed to Baltimore. Two years later his father's death recalled him to Lyme, where he continued the practice of his profession.

He served as a member of the Connecticut State Senate in 1858, and of the Connecticut House of Representatives in 1859, and again as a member of the State Senate in 1864, being thus twice ex officio a fellow of Yale College. He was State's attorney for New London County from 1861 to 1876, and from 1880 till his death United States Attorney for the District of Connecticut. He died very suddenly at his home in Lyme, November 23, 1884, in his 60th year.

== Personal life ==
Chadwick married Ellen Hayes on March 21, 1848. She was the third daughter of Enoch Hayes of Lyme who outlived. He had two sons and two daughters, one of whom preceded Chadwick in death.
