= Lloyd S. Nelson =

American statistician (1922–2013)

- Born: Lloyd Steadman Nelson; March 29, 1922; Norwich, Connecticut, U.S.
- Died: August 28, 2013 (aged 91); Clemson, South Carolina, U.S.
- Education: University of North Carolina at Chapel Hill (BS); University of Connecticut (PhD)
- Occupations: Statistician; educator
- Known for: Nelson rules
- Spouse: Frances Betty Pallant (m. 1982; died 2007)
- Children: 3
- Awards: Shewhart Medal

Lloyd Steadman Nelson (March 29, 1922 – August 28, 2013) was an American statistician. He is known for developing the Nelson rules, a statistical process control methodology to determine when a process is out of control.

== Early life ==
Lloyd Steadman Nelson was born on March 29, 1922, in Norwich, Connecticut, to Marion (née Rogers) and Ronald R. Nelson. He graduated from the University of North Carolina at Chapel Hill with a Bachelor of Science in chemistry in 1943. He served in the United States Navy from 1944 to 1946. He then graduated with a PhD in inorganic chemistry from the University of Connecticut in 1950.

== Career ==
Nelson taught for a few years. He was a consulting statistician with General Electric Lamp Division in Cleveland. He was then manager at the Applied Mathematics Laboratory at GE Appliances in Louisville, Kentucky. In 1980, he began working for Nashua Corporation as director of statistical methods. In 1992, he retired from Nashua Corporation.

Nelson was editor of the American Society for Quality (ASQ) publication Industrial Quality Control in the 1960s and helped direct the publication to split into two, a general interest magazine Quality Progress and a technical quarterly publication the Journal of Quality Technology. He was the first editor of the Journal of Quality Technology. He served on ASQ's awards board and the Shewhart and Deming Medal committees. He was a member of the Journal of Quality Technology's editorial review board. He wrote the "Technical Aids" feature of the Journal of Quality Technology for more than 20 years.

In the October 1984 issue of the Journal of Quality Technology, Nelson first published the Nelson rules, a statistical process control methodology to indicate when a process is out of control.

== Personal life ==
Nelson married Frances "Fran" Betty Pallant, daughter of Margaret (née Roth) and Frank W. Pallant, in 1982. They had one son and two daughters, Peter R., Fay and Barbara. His wife died in 2007. He lived most of his life in Londonderry, New Hampshire.

Nelson died on August 28, 2013, in Clemson, South Carolina.

== Awards and legacy ==
In 1964, Nelson was made a fellow of ASQ and was awarded the Shewhart Medal in 1978. In 2001, he received ASQ's Distinguished Service Medal. On February 8, 2003, he was made an honorary member of ASQ. Subsequently, to commemorate his many contributions, the Lloyd S. Nelson Award was established in his honor.

In W. Edwards Deming's Out of the Crisis, Deming highlights Nelson's observation that "the most important figures that one needs for management are unknown or unknowable, but successful management must nevertheless take them into account".
