= Western Electric rules =

Decision rules for interpreting control-chart data

The Western Electric rules are decision rules in statistical process control for detecting out-of-control or non-random conditions on control charts. Locations of the observations relative to the control chart control limits (typically at ±3 standard deviations) and centerline indicate whether the process in question should be investigated for assignable causes. The Western Electric rules were codified by a specially-appointed committee of the manufacturing division of the Western Electric Company and appeared in the first edition of a 1956 handbook, that became a standard text of the field. Their purpose was to ensure that line workers and engineers interpret control charts in a uniform way.

== Motivation ==
The rules attempt to distinguish unnatural patterns from natural patterns based on several criteria: The absence of points near the centerline is identified as a mixture pattern.

The absence of points near the control limits is identified as a stratification pattern.

The presence of points outside the control limits is identified as an instability pattern.

Other unnatural patterns are categorized as systematic (autocorrelative), repetition, or trend patterns.

This classification divides the chart of observations into zones, measured in units of standard deviation (σ) between the centerline and control limits, as follows:

Zone	Region
Zone A	Between 2σ from the centerline and the control limit (3σ)
Zone B	Between 1σ and 2σ from the centerline
Zone C	Within 1σ of the centerline

Zones A, B, and C are sometimes called the three sigma zone, two sigma zone, and one sigma zone, respectively.

== Zone rules ==
An important aspect of the Western Electric rules are the zone rules, designed to detect process instability, and the presence of assignable causes. Data sets of observations are appraised by four basic rules, that categorize the occurrence of data samples in a set of zones defined by multiples of the standard deviation.

	Description	Chart example
Rule 1	Any single data point falls outside the 3σ-limit from the centerline (i.e., any point that falls outside Zone A, beyond either the upper or lower control limit)	
Rule 2	Two out of three consecutive points fall beyond the 2σ-limit (in zone A or beyond), on the same side of the centerline	
Rule 3	Four out of five consecutive points fall beyond the 1σ-limit (in zone B or beyond), on the same side of the centerline	
Rule 4	Eight consecutive points fall on the same side of the centerline (in zone C or beyond)	

These rules are evaluated for one side of the center line (one half of the control band) at a time (e.g., first the centerline to the upper control limit, then the centerline to the lower control limit).

Data satisfying any of these conditions as indicated by the control chart provide the justification for investigating the process to discover whether assignable causes are present and can be removed. Note that there is always a possibility of false positives: Assuming observations are normally distributed, one expects Rule 1 to be triggered by chance one out of every 370 observations on average. The false alarm rate rises to one out of every 91.75 observations when evaluating all four rules.

=== Asymmetric control limits ===
The zone rules presented above apply to control charts with symmetric control limits. The handbook provides additional guidelines for control charts where the control limits are not symmetrical, as for R charts and p-charts.

For $\bar x$ and R charts (which plot the behavior of the subgroup range), the Handbook recommends using the zone rules above for subgroups of sufficient size (five or more). For small sample subgroups, the Handbook recommends:

Small-sample R chart rules
Any single data point falling above the +3σ limit
Two consecutive points falling above the +2σ-limit (in the upper zone A or above)
Three consecutive points falling above the +1σ-limit (in the upper zone B or above)
Seven consecutive points falling above the centerline (in the upper zone C or above)
Ten consecutive points falling below the centerline (in the lower zone C or below)
Six consecutive points falling below the -1σ-limit (in the lower zone B or below)
Four consecutive points falling below the -2σ-limit (in the lower zone A)

For other control charts based on skewed distributions, the Handbook recommends:

- Finding the probabilities associated with each zone
- Devising tests that should result in the desired sensitivity to the presence of assignable causes

== Other unnatural patterns ==
The handbook also identifies patterns that require consideration of both the upper and lower halves of the control chart together for identification:

Pattern	Description	Rule
Stratification	Variation small relative to control limits	Fifteen consecutive points fall within ±1σ (zone C)
Mixture	The tendency to avoid the centerline	Eight consecutive points on both sides of the centerline with no points falling in zone C.
Systematic	Negative autocorrelation—a long series of observations that alternate high-low-high-low	(No rule given)
Repetition	The tendency of one chart to follow the same pattern as its predecessor	(No rule given)
Trend	Sustained drift or shift in the long-term mean	A series of out-of-control points in the lower zones followed by a series of out-of-control points in the upper zones or vice versa A series of points without a change in direction

== See also ==
- Nelson rules
- Westgard rules
