= Tilton E. Doolittle =

American attorney and politician (1825–1896)

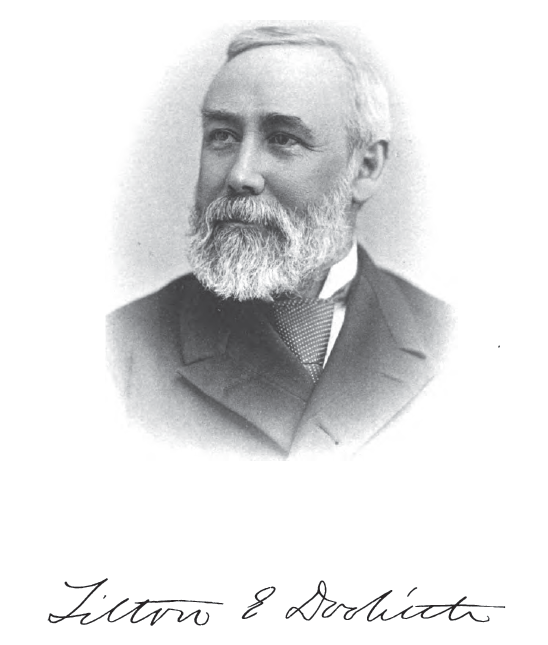

United States Attorney for the District of Connecticut
- In office 1860–1861
- President: James Buchanan
- Preceded by: William Davis Shipman
- Succeeded by: Hiram Willey

Personal details
- Born: Tilton Edwin Doolittle; July 31, 1825 Riverton, Connecticut, U.S.
- Died: March 21, 1896 (aged 70) New Haven, Connecticut
- Party: Democratic
- Education: Protestant Episcopal Academy; Trinity College (1844); Yale Law School (1846)
- Profession: Lawyer, politician

Tilton Edwin Doolittle (July 31, 1825 – March 21, 1896) was an American attorney who served as the United States Attorney for the District of Connecticut under President Buchanan. He also served as the speaker of the house of the Connecticut House of Representatives.

== Biography ==
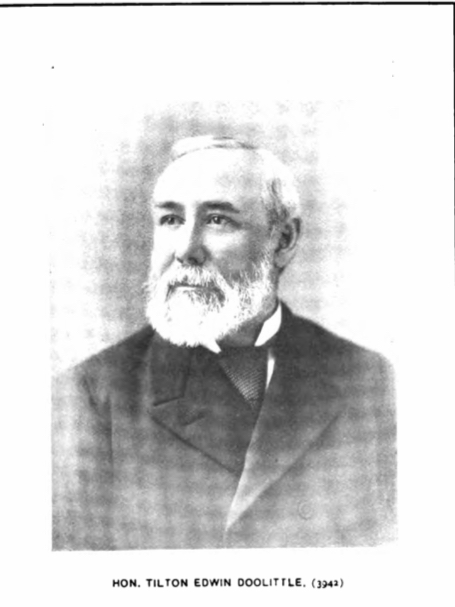

Tilton Edwin Doolittle was born on July 31, 1825, to Elizabeth A. Benham and Ambrose E. Doolittle a farmer, in Riverton, Connecticut. His mother was on a short visit at the time, and he was brought home to Cheshire soon after where he would grow up. He attended the Protestant Episcopal Academy, in 1840 he entered Trinity College (at that point known as Washington College) graduating A. B. 1844; afterwards rec'd A. M. degree. He studied at Yale Law School graduating 1846 the same year he was admitted to the bar all before he was 21. He practiced law from 1846 until 1850 in Cheshire, from 1850 to 1858 in Meriden, and thereafter in New Haven, where he resided until his death on March 21, 1896. In 1860 Mr. Doolittle was appointed United States District Attorney for the District of Connecticut by President Buchanan, but relinquished the office the following year. In 1866, 1867 and 1870 his fellow citizens, appreciating his quality, elected him a representative from New Haven in the State Legislature. On being again elected in 1874. he was chosen Speaker of the House. In 1861 Doolittle formed a partnership with Judge Samuel L. Bronson, which lasted until 1870. The next 4 years he practiced law alone only to be followed in 1874 by an association with Judge Henry Stoddard. In 1876 Mr. William L. Bennett was added to the firm. Mr. Doolittle was appointed by Richard D. Hubbard States Attorney for New Haven, Connecticut 1879, succeeding O. H. Piatt. He resigned January 1, 1896. He would hold this position until his death in 1896.
