= Westgard rules =

Statistical patterns

The Westgard rules are a set of statistical patterns, each being unlikely to occur by random variability, thereby raising a suspicion of faulty accuracy or precision of the measurement system. They are used for laboratory quality control, in "runs" consisting of measurements of multiple samples. They are a set of modified Western Electric rules, developed by James Westgard and provided in his books and seminars on quality control. They are plotted on Levey–Jennings charts, wherein the X-axis shows each individual sample, and the Y-axis shows how much each one differs from the mean in terms of standard deviation (SD). The rules are:

Rule	Criteria	Suspected	Example
1_{2s}	One measurement exceeds 2 standard deviations either above or below the mean of the reference range.	Inaccuracy and/or imprecision	
1_{3s}	One measurement exceeds 3 standard deviations either above or below the mean of the reference range.	Inaccuracy and/or imprecision	
2_{2s}	2 consecutive measurements exceed 2 standard deviations of the reference range, and on the same side of the mean.	Inaccuracy and/or imprecision	
R_{4s}	Two measurements in the same run have a 4 standard deviation difference (such as one exceeding 2 standard deviations above the mean, and another exceeding 2 standard deviations below the mean).	Imprecision.	
4_{1s}	4 consecutive measurements exceed 1 standard deviation on the same side of the mean.	Inaccuracy.	
10_{x}	10 consecutive measurements are on the same side of the mean.	Inaccuracy.	

The recommended consequences when any of the above patterns occur is to reject the run, except for the rule of 1_{2s} (top in table), which serves as a warning and a recommendation of careful inspection of the data.

== See also ==
- Western Electric rules
- Nelson rules
