= Daniel W. Apley =

American statistician and engineer

- Citizenship: American
- Known for: Statistical process control Data mining Quality engineering
- Awards: ASA Fellow (2019); NSF CAREER Award (2001)

Academic background
- Education: University of Michigan
- Doctoral advisor: Jianjun Shi; Jun Ni

Academic work
- Institutions: Northwestern University; Texas A&M University
- Website: Faculty Profile

Daniel W. Apley is an American statistician and engineer. He is a professor of industrial engineering and management sciences at Northwestern University. He is known for contributing to the fields of statistical modeling, machine learning, and quality engineering, particularly in the diagnosis and control of complex manufacturing systems.

Apley served as the editor-in-chief of the Journal of Quality Technology from 2009 to 2012 and of Technometrics from 2017 to 2019. He was elected a Fellow of the American Statistical Association in 2019.

== Education ==
Apley attended the University of Michigan, where he earned a Bachelor of Science (B.Sc.) and Master of Science (M.S.) in mechanical engineering in 1990 and 1992 respectively. Then in 1995 he earned a second M.S. in electrical engineering. He completed his Doctor of Philosophy (Ph.D.) in mechanical engineering in 1997 under the supervision of Jianjun Shi and Jun Ni.

== Career ==
Following his doctoral studies, Apley served as an assistant professor at Texas A&M University from 1998 to 2003. He joined the faculty of Northwestern University in 2003 as associate professor and was subsequently promoted to full professor in the Department of Industrial Engineering and Management Sciences. He also served as the director of the Manufacturing and Design Engineering Program at Northwestern from 2004 to 2008.

Apley has held significant leadership roles in major academic journals within the fields of statistics and quality engineering:

- 2002-2009: Associate Editor for Technometrics, a leading journal for statistics in the physical, chemical, and engineering sciences published by the American Statistical Association (ASA) and the American Society for Quality (ASQ).
- 2009-2012: Editor-in-Chief of the Journal of Quality Technology.
- 2017-2019: Editor-in-Chief of Technometrics.

== Research ==
Apley's research focuses on the interface of engineering modeling, statistical analysis, and data mining. His work addresses the challenges of data-rich manufacturing environments, specifically in the development of methods for statistical process control, fault diagnosis, and the analysis of simulation models.

He is also known for developing accumulated local effects (ALE) plots, a method for visualizing the effects of predictor variables in supervised learning ("black box") models. This method is considered an improvement over partial dependence plots when predictor variables are correlated.

== Awards and honors ==
- 2001: National Science Foundation CAREER Award.
- 2003: IIE Transactions Best Paper Award.
- 2008 (and again in 2023): Frank Wilcoxon Prize from the ASA and ASQ.
- 2019: Lloyd S. Nelson Award for the paper with the greatest immediate impact to practitioners appearing in the Journal of Quality Technology in the prior year.
- 2019: Elected Fellow of the American Statistical Association for "leadership in statistics at the national level" and outstanding publications leadership.

== Selected Publications ==
- Apley, Daniel W.; Shi, Jianjun (1999). "The GLRT for statistical process control of autocorrelated processes". IIE Transactions. 31 (12): 1123–1134. doi:10.1080/07408179908969913. hdl:2027.42/45916.
- Apley, Daniel W.; Lee, Hyun Cheol (2003). "Design of Exponentially Weighted Moving Average Control Charts for Autocorrelated Processes with Model Uncertainty". Technometrics. 45 (3): 187–198. doi:10.1198/004017003000000014.
- Apley, Daniel W.; Zhu, Jingyu (2020). "Visualizing the Effects of Predictor Variables in Black Box Supervised Learning Models". Journal of the Royal Statistical Society: Series B (Statistical Methodology). 82 (4): 1059–1086. doi:10.1111/rssb.12377.
