= Northeastern Connecticut Transit District =

Regional public transit agency in Connecticut, US

- Formerly: NECTAR (1977–1980)
- Founded: October 1979
- Commenced operation: August 11, 1980
- Headquarters: Dayville, Connecticut
- Service area: Northeastern Connecticut Planning Region
- Service type: Fixed routes; ADA dial-a-ride service
- Routes: Six fixed routes
- Website: www.nectd.org

The Northeastern Connecticut Transit District (NECTD) is an agency providing multiple forms of public transportation in northeastern Connecticut. Six fixed routes (with deviation on request) provide week-round service to the towns of Brooklyn, Killingly, Plainfield, Putnam, and Thompson. Using fixed route service connections to WRTD can be made in Killingly and to SEAT in Plainfield respectively. With advance reservation NECTD also offers dial-a-ride service to the general public and door-to-door to select elderly and disabled persons. Dial-a-ride and door-to-door service is available to all towns served by NECTD's fixed routes as well as to Canterbury, Eastford, Hampton, Pomfret, Union, and Woodstock. Following a pilot program which began in 1977, NECTD was founded in October 1979, with its first service beginning in August 1980.

== History ==
The logo of NECTAR

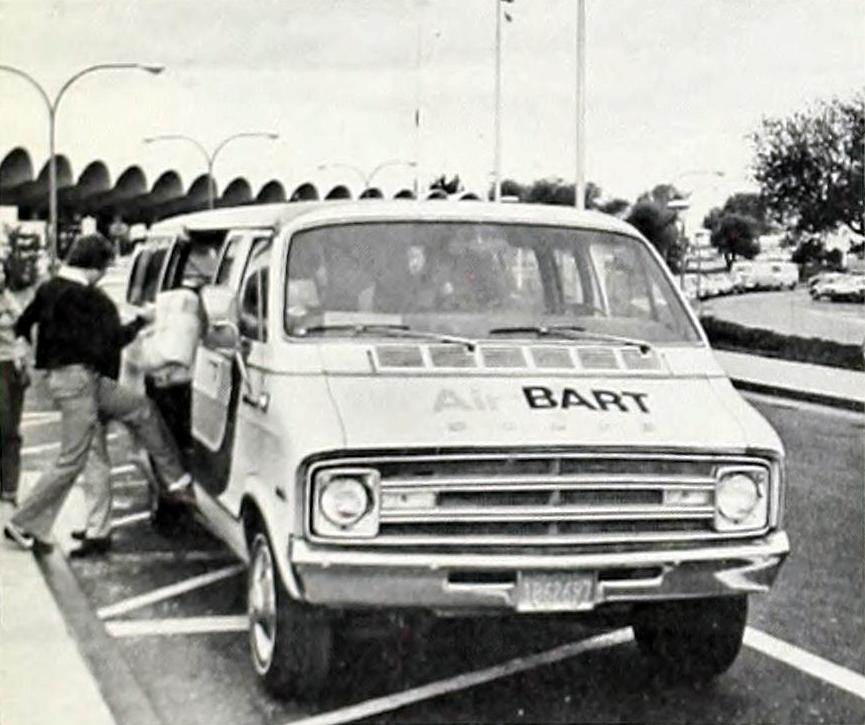
A Dodge Maxivan operated by BART at Oakland International Airport in 1977, the same year NECTAR introduced vans of the same model.

=== NECTAR (1977–1979) ===
Prior to the start of NECTD service in 1980, the Northeastern Connecticut Regional Planning Agency (later the Northeastern Connecticut Council of Governments) operated a door-to-door bus service known as Northeast Connecticut Telephone and Ride (NECTAR).

NECTAR began as a pilot program by the Northeastern Connecticut Regional Planning Agency and was funded by the Federal Highway Administration. Service was launched in September 1977 to examine the feasibility of a larger public transport system in northeast Connecticut. NECTAR began as a free service offering door-to-door transport for residents of Brooklyn, Canterbury, Eastford, Killingly, Plainfield, Pomfret, Putnam, Sterling, Thompson, and Woodstock. To use NECTAR residents of the ten towns served had to be added to a list by the organization to be served during peak hours, or call at least one day in advance for service between 9 a.m. and 2 p.m. Service was initially provided by three yellow Dodge maxivans.

Citing that $89,000 was necessary to keep the system operational until July 1979, NECTAR ended its free services in April 1978. In September 1978 federal funding was secured assuring the service's continuation into 1979.

In September 1979, the Northeastern Connecticut Council of Governments discussed the establishment of a new regional transit system to supersede NECTAR. In October, the Northeastern Connecticut Transit District (NECTD) was created and officials were appointed to its organization. The goal of NECTD, according to NECTAR/NECTD-affiliated transportation planner Tom Maziarz, consisted of "two districts offering door-to-door service and fixed bus route service along Rt. 12 between the districts."

=== Preparation for NECTD (1979–1980) ===
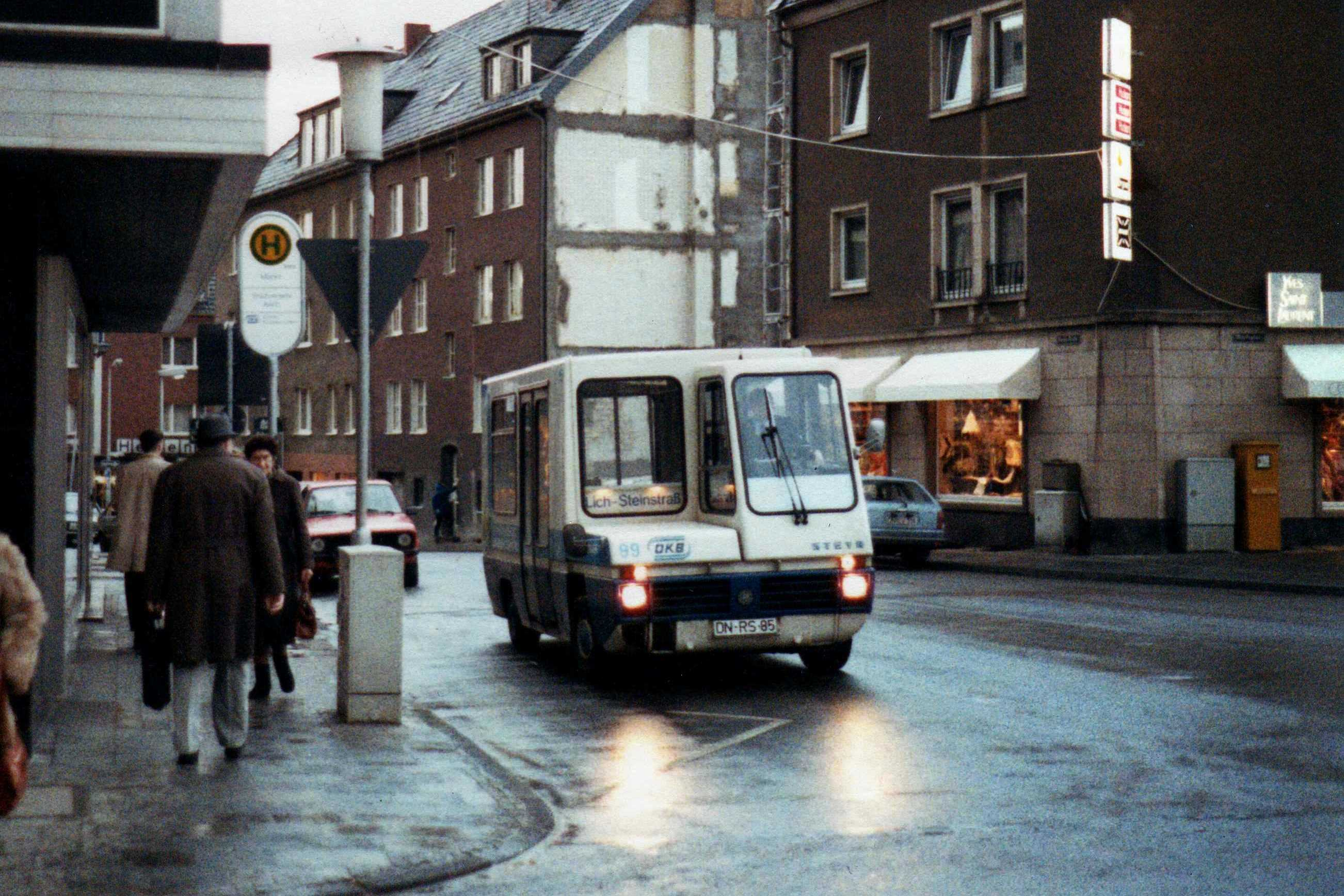
A Steyr City Bus operated by Dürener Kreisbahn in the town of Jülich, Germany in 1986. Although planned in 1980, NECTD introduced these buses in February 1982.

Although the structure of NECTD was created in 1979, the service did not begin until July 1980. During the beginning of 1980 a number of town meetings were held to cover aspects of NECTD's proposed services, although these meetings often had extremely low turnout, averaging around 10 attendees each.

The federal government was expected to cover 50% of NECTD's costs, the state of Connecticut 33%, and member municipalities the remaining 17% respectively. For fares, individual rides were anticipated to cost between $0.50 and $1.00 ($1.81 and $3.61 in 2021) with the reduced rate for elderly and disabled persons being between $0.25 and $0.50 ($0.90 and $1.81 in 2021). Individual routes were identified around January 1980, with Maziarz noting stops along Route 12, Day Kimball Hospital, the Murphy Recreation Park, and to elderly homes and housing complexes in the area.

In May 1980 Gerald McCarthy, acting director of NECTD, noted the insufficiency of NECTAR's van fleet in the pilot program's service: "During commuter hours our three existing vans are running full, and we're turning away people." As part of reducing congestion, a number of solutions were planned to be implemented under NECTD. These included the acquisition of a fourth van, the replacement of all vans with Steyr City Buses, and a "transportation brokerage" to coordinate carpool and vanpool service.

Although "telephone and ride" service was originally intended for NECTD, its planned implementation was significantly reduced by May. The towns of Pomfret, Putnam, and Sterling pulled out from funding NECTD, leading to their removal from the district. Although Putnam was considered too important a city to leave out of the program, it would not receive service until November 28, 1980. Following Pomfret, Putnam, and Sterling's removal, NECTD's fixed route and car-/vanpool services were only planned to serve Brooklyn, Canterbury, Eastford, Killingly, Plainfield, Thompson, and Woodstock.

=== Early years (1980–1986) ===
The first logo of NECTD, which was based on that of NECTAR.

More than a month after originally anticipated, NECTD made its first fixed route trip at 9:05 a.m. on Monday, August 11, 1980 in Danielson. The district's first rider was Mary Moulin, a resident of the Westfield Village senior citizens' complex.

Although carpooling and vanpooling services were promised, they had not yet been implemented by late-September 1980. On October 28, 1980 carpool and vanpool services began, branded by the district as "Ride Share".

In November 1980 Putnam's Chamber of Commerce paid for the town to re-enter NECTD citing sales losses that occurred since their withdrawal. On November 28, 1980 service to Putnam was added along the Danielson-Thompson route, alongside the town's entry into NECTD's "Ride Share" and telephone-and-ride services.

In December 1980 NECTD's single route was split into two using funds donated by the Putnam Chamber of Commerce. These two routes would be short lived however, with the district reverting back to a single route in August 1981.

As of February 1981 NECTD still lacked any designated bus stops along its fixed routes. In response to criticism that lacking designated stops dissuaded riders, Plainfield representative Georgette Chenail responded that "bus drivers are alert and watch for riders along the route". Despite Chenail's assurances, NECTD's board did consider bus stop designation to be needed.

On February 13, 1982 a ceremony was held in Brooklyn to commemorate the arrival and implementation of Steyr City Buses into the NECTD fleet.

In June 1986 NECTD's dial-a-ride services (formerly referred to as "telephone-and-ride") were merged with those of the Quinebaug Valley Senior Citizens Center.

== Routes and fares ==
=== August–December 1980 ===
Upon the creation of NECTD a single fixed route was implemented which served different locations on different days:

- A local loop in Danielson, weekdays from 9 a.m. to 3 p.m.
- Service between Danielson and Thompson, Mondays, Wednesdays, and Fridays
- Service to Plainfield from Danielson, Tuesdays and Thursdays

Alongside its fixed route, telephone-and-ride service was available in the eight participating municipalities.

Service to Putnam along the Danielson-Thompson route was added on November 28, 1980 after the town was re-integrated into NECTD.

From August 11 (the day service began) to August 29, all service was provided free of charge.

=== December 1980–1981 ===
Following a donation from the Putnam Chamber of Commerce in December 1980, NECTD's single route was split into two:

- Thompson–Putnam
- Killingly–Plainfield–East Brooklyn

In February 1981 a program designating free fares once a month was introduced, intended to increase ridership. Fares during this period were $0.50 locally and $1.00 between towns.

=== 1981–1990 ===
On August 1, 1981 NECTD's two routes were consolidated into a single route from Thompson to Plainfield:

- Thompson–Plainfield (commonly referred to as the Regional Route), Tuesdays through Saturdays from 9 a.m. to 4 p.m.

In February 1989 service was altered to begin at 9:30 a.m. and end at 6:36 p.m.

=== 2016–2020 ===
Aside from the renaming off all weekday routes in 2016, there were little changes to the routes for a number of years:

- Blue Line (Northern Loop until 2016): served Putnam, weekdays from 8:15 a.m. to 4:30 p.m.
- Green Line (Southern Loop until 2016): served Killingly–Brooklyn, weekdays from 7:30 a.m. to 5:30 p.m.
- Purple Line (South Shuttle until 2016): served Thompson–Putnam–Killingly–Brooklyn (southbound), weekdays from 7:30 a.m. to 5:20 p.m.
- Red Line (North Shuttle until 2016): served Brooklyn–Killingly–Putnam–Thompson (northbound), weekdays from 8:35 a.m. to 4:30 p.m.
- Weekender Service: served Thompson–Putnam–Killingly–Brooklyn from 7:30 a.m. to 1:40 p.m.

=== 2020–present ===
Since the creation of the Orange Line in 2020 NECTD operates six routes, five which operate on weekdays and one which operates on weekends:

- Blue Line: serves Putnam, weekdays from 8:15 a.m. to 4:30 p.m.
- Green Line: serves Killingly–Brooklyn, weekdays from 7:30 a.m. to 5:30 p.m.
- Orange Line: serves Brooklyn–Plainfield, weekdays from 7:40 a.m. to 5:05 p.m.
- Purple Line: serves Thompson–Putnam–Killingly–Brooklyn (southbound), weekdays from 7:50 a.m. to 5:00 p.m.
- Red Line: serves Brooklyn–Killingly–Putnam–Thompson (northbound), weekdays from 9:00 a.m. to 5:10 p.m.
- Weekender Service: serves Thompson–Putnam–Killingly–Brooklyn from 7:30 a.m. to 1:40 p.m.
