= Validation and verification (medical devices) =

Validation and verification are procedures that ensure that medical devices fulfil their intended purpose. Validation or verification is generally needed when a health facility acquires a new device to perform medical tests.

== Validation or verification ==
The main difference between the two is that validation is focused on ensuring that the device meets the needs and requirements of its intended users and the intended use environment, whereas verification is focused on ensuring that the device meets its specified design requirements.

For instance, a regulatory agency (such as CE or FDA) may ensure that a product has been validated for general use before approval. An individual laboratory that introduces such an approved medical device may then not need to perform their own validation, but generally still need to perform verification to ensure that the device works correctly.

== Workflow ==
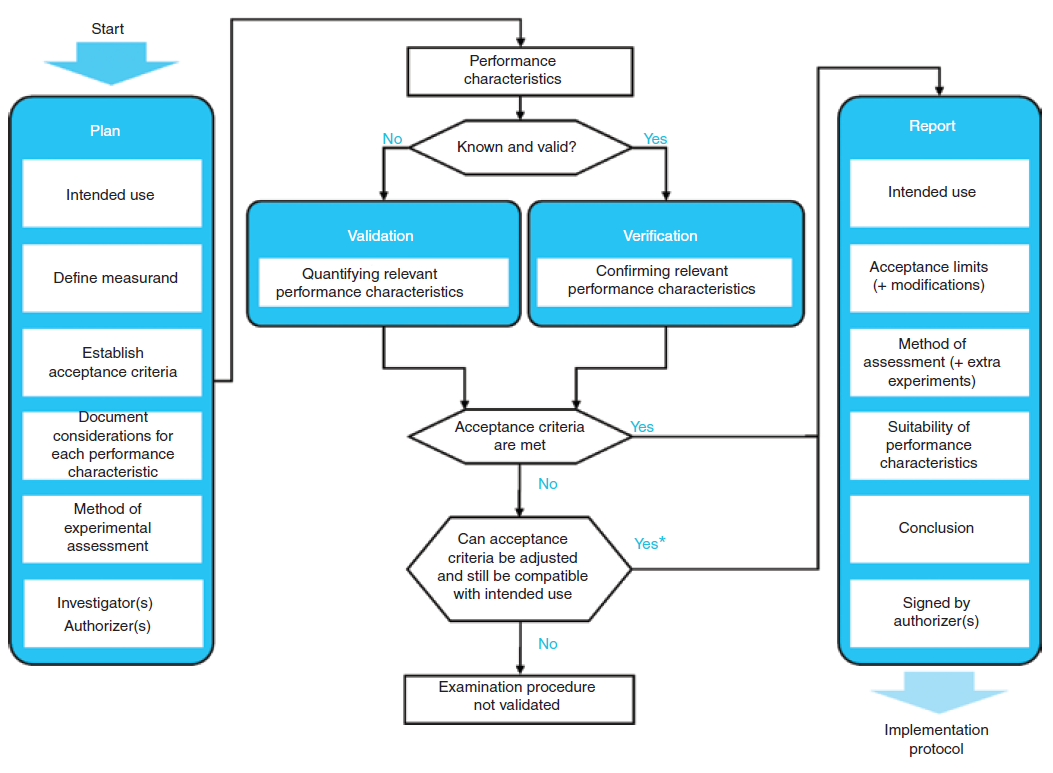
A generalized workflow of validation and verification of new medical test procedures.

== Standards ==
Standards for validation and verification of medical laboratories are outlined in the international standard ISO 15189, in addition to national and regional regulations.

As per United States federal regulations, the following analytical tests need to be done by a medical laboratory that introduces a new testing device:

Parameter(s)	Verification of FDA-approved device	Validation of a laboratory-developed test
Accuracy and precision	Yes	Yes
Reportable range	Yes	Yes
Analytical sensitivity	Yes	Yes
Analytical specificity		Yes
Reference range	Verification	Establishment
Carryover effect		Yes
Sample/materials stability		Yes

To establish a reference range, the Clinical and Laboratory Standards Institute (CLSI) recommends testing at least 120 patient samples. In contrast, for the verification of a reference range, it is recommended to use a total of 40 samples, 20 from healthy men and 20 from healthy women, and the results should be compared to the published reference range. The results should be evenly spread throughout the published reference range rather than clustered at one end. The published reference range can be accepted for use if 95% of the results fall within it. Otherwise, the laboratory needs to establish its own reference range.

== See also ==
- Validation (drug manufacture)
