= Windham Region Transit District =

Bus operator in Connecticut, U.S.

Windham Regional Transit District
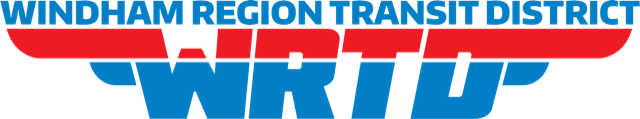

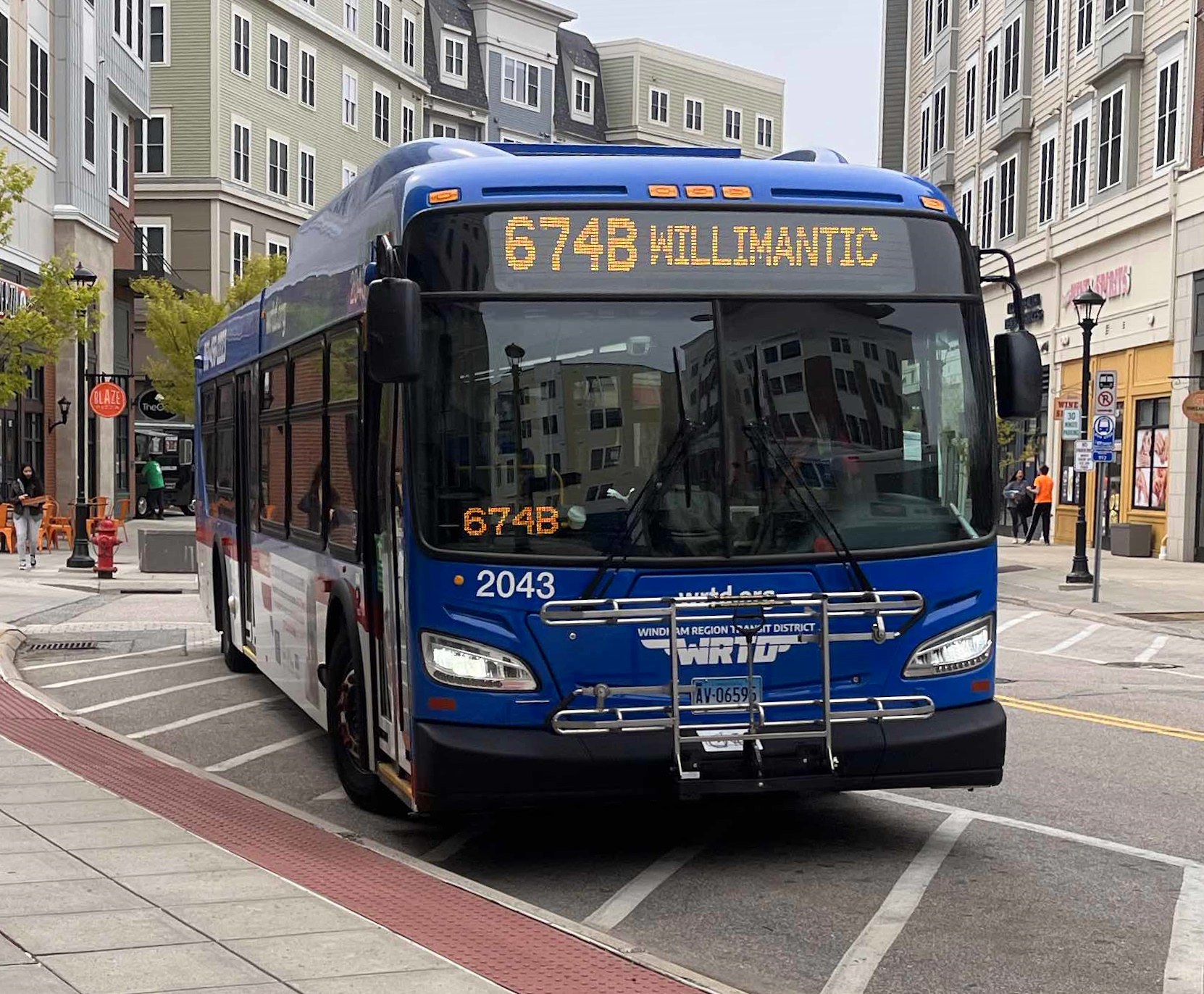
- A WRTD Route 674B bus in Downtown Storrs in April 2023
- Headquarters: 28 South Frontage Road; Mansfield, Connecticut
- Locale: Windham, Mansfield
- Service type: Local, Express bus service
- Routes: 6 routes
- Destinations: Mansfield/ Storrs, Windham/ Willimantic, Brooklyn (CT), Danielson, Norwich
- Website: wrtd.org

Windham Region Transit District, or WRTD, is a bus operator for Windham County, with NECTD, SEAT, UConn Transportation Services in neighboring towns. Prior to August 2019, The company operated four routes in total, connecting with a small handful of other operators, such as UConn Transportation Services in Mansfield, SEAT in Norwich, and NECTD in Brooklyn, Connecticut. Because of the small collection of routes, they have approximately ten fixed route buses, with some Paratransit vehicles. Beginning August 14, 2017, WRTD provided connections to CTtransit in Mansfield Storrs with the 913 Express route to Hartford, Connecticut. WRTD also provides Dial-A-Ride within their nine-town district (Ashford, Chaplin, Columbia, Coventry, Lebanon, Mansfield, Scotland, Willington and Windham. ADA Paratransit is provided for areas within 3/4 mile of WRTD's Local Routes.

== Routes (effective August 19, 2019) ==
To improve usefulness and better suit riders, WRTD's existing routes were reconfigured and renumbered. This renumbering is part of a campaign to implement a statewide bus route number system.

Route Number and Destination	Serving...	Available connections and other notes
Route 671: Willimantic East (Route 66) (Local Route)	Gateway Commons; Windham Hospital; Windham Heights; North Windham/Walmart; East Brook Mall	Connects with Routes 672, 674, 991, and 993 at Gateway Commons.; Connects with CTtransit Route 918 at Main & Bank Streets in Willimantic.; Part of former Route 671 "City Bus: Heights" routing.
Route 672: Willimantic Central (Local Route)	Gateway Commons; Windham Hospital; ECSU; *United Services Health Center; East Brook Mall; North Windham/Walmart	Connects with Routes 671, 674, 991, and 993 at Gateway Commons.; Connects with CTtransit Route 918 at Main & Bank Streets in Willimantic.; Part of former Route 671 "City Bus: High Street" routing.
Route 674: Storrs/Willimantic (Local Route)	Gateway Commons; East Brook Mall; Mansfield Town Center; Mansfield Senior Center; Mansfield Transportation Center; UCONN Storrs Campus; Holiday Mall/Jensen's	Connects with Routes 671, 672, 991, and 993 at Gateway Commons.; Connects with Routes 671 and 672 at East Brook Mall.; Connects with Route 675 at Mansfield Transit Center.; Connects with CTtransit Route 913 at Mansfield Transportation Center.; Connects with CTtransit Route 918 at Main & Bank Streets in Willimantic.; Connects with HuskyGo (UConn Campus Shuttle) at Mansfield Transportation Center and at various points on the UConn Storrs Campus.; Formerly Route 672 "Storrs-Willimantic".; Three branches of this route exist: 674A: Serving the "Four Corners" area of Storrs and the Holiday Mall; 674B: Express - Foster Drive to UConn East Campus.; 674C: South Eagleville Road, Mansfield Senior Center, and the Mansfield Transportation Center .
Route 675: Hunting Lodge (Local Route)	Mansfield Transportation Center; UCONN Storrs Campus; Hunting Lodge and Birch Roads; Jensen's (near Holiday Mall)	Connects with Route 674; Formerly HuskyGo (UConn Campus Shuttle) Line Purple.; Operates when UCONN is in session.
Route 991: Willimantic-Norwich (Route 32) (Commuter Route)	Windham Heights; Gateway Commons; Norwich Transportation Center; Foxwoods Casino	Connects with Routes 671, 672, 674, and 993 at Gateway Commons.; Connects with CTtransit Route 918 at Main & Bank Streets in Willimantic.; Connects with Southeast Area Transit at the Norwich Transportation Center.; Operates Daily.
Route 993: Willimantic-Danielson (Commuter Route)	Main & Bank Streets; Windham Heights; North Windham; Walmart; Quinebaug Valley Community College (QVCC, Danielson)	Connects with Routes 671, 672, 674, CTtransit Route 918, and 991 at Main & Bank Streets in Willimantic.; Connects with Northeast Connecticut Transit District Lines Red/Purple at QVCC.

== Fares ==
Fare name and cost	How long does it last	Notes
Local Fare: $1.25	See notes	Lasts until after rider transfers to another local bus.
Express: $2.75	See notes	Can be used to transfer to Local Route, free of charge Applies only to Routes 991 and 993.
Disabled: $0.75	See notes	Lasts until after rider transfers to another local bus.
Senior Citizen (Age 60+): Donation	See notes	Lasts until after rider transfers to another local bus.
10 Punch Pass: $12.00	For 10 punches (Either 5 or 10 trips)	Local Routes count as one punch.; Commuter Routes, Dial-A-Ride and ADA Paratransit count as two punches.
Local Monthly Pass: $40.00	Expires on last day of active month.	Valid only on Local Routes
Local Disabled Monthly Pass: $25.00	Expires on last day of active month.	Proof of eligibility required. Valid only on Local Routes

== See also ==
- Connecticut Transit Hartford
- SEAT
- UConn Storrs
- Northeastern Connecticut Transit District
