= Isaac H. Bromley =

American journalist

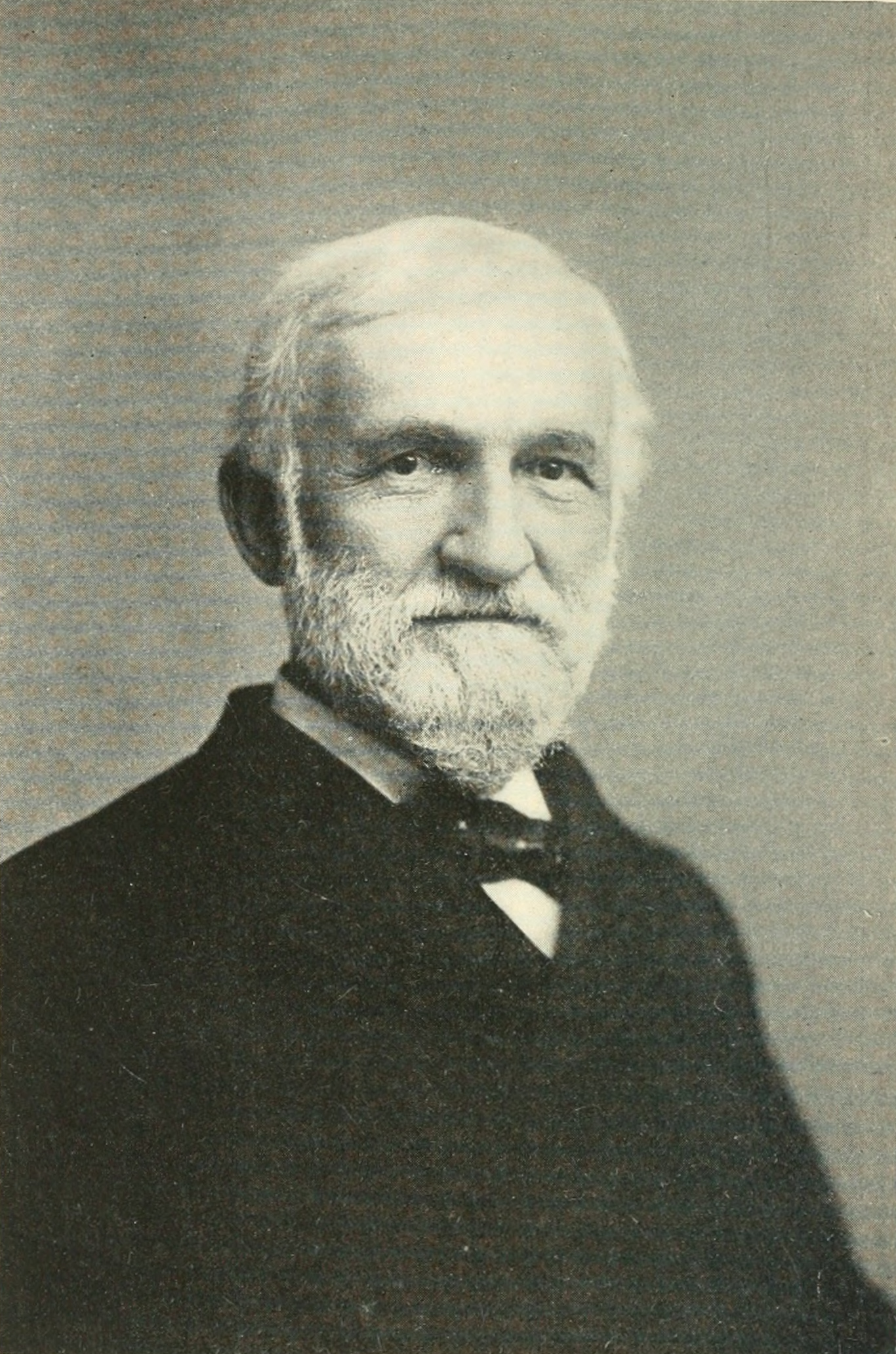
Isaac H. Bromley

Isaac Hill Bromley (1833–1899) was an American lawyer, editor, politician, railroad director, and humorist.

== Biography ==
Isaac Hill Bromley was born on March 6, 1833, in Norwich, Connecticut. He was educated at Yale, but left in the November of his sophomore year, but was awarded a degree in 1868.

He studied law at Norwich and New Haven and was admitted to the bar in 1854. In 1855 he edited a weekly newspaper, The State Guard in Norwich, where he married, on December 25, Miss Adelaide E. Roath. In January 1856 he formed a law partnership, but was soon diverted from it by his chosen profession, editorial journalism, and never returned to it. He was made Assistant Clerk of the State House of Representatives in 1856, Clerk in 1857, and Clark of the Senate on 1858.

In November 1858 he moved to Norwich and began the publication of a new paper, The Bulletin. In August 1862 he enlisted in the 18th Connecticut Volunteers and was commissioned as captain. He served for most of his time as Provost Marshal of the Third District of Connecticut until his resignation in March 1964. In 1866 he was elected to the legislature from Norwich.

In 1868 he moved to Hartford and took editorial control of the Evening Post, with which he continued until 1872. In February 1873 he joined the editorial staff of the New York Tribune and remained with that paper for ten years. In the meantime, in June 1873, he was appointed by President Arthur as one of the Government Directors of the Union Pacific Railroad. After a series of brief editorial engagement with the Commercial Adventurer and the Evening Telegram of New York, and the Rochester Post-Express, he became in 1884 Assistant to the President of the Union Pacific Railroad, and held that office until 1889. In October 1891, he resumed editorial work on the New York Tribune, and continued in active service until a few months before his death.

In April 1898 after several years of poor health, he became seriously ill, and in June was removed to the Backus Hospital in Norwich, where he died from neuritis on August 11, in his 66th year.

His Yale University obituary describes him thus: "A trenchant writer, gifted with a style of unusual brilliancy and unique in its quality of wit, he ranked easily among the leaders of his profession in his generation and was as warmly beloved as he was admired.

== Notes ==
- This article is based on the Obituary Record of the Graduates of Yale University, deceased in the academical year ending June 1899, which is in the public domain.
