= Calvin Goddard (politician) =

American politician

Calvin Goddard (July 17, 1768 – May 2, 1842) was a United States representative from Connecticut.

== Biography ==
He was born in Shrewsbury, Massachusetts. He attended Plainfield Academy where he pursued classical studies, and graduated from Dartmouth College in 1786. He studied law and was admitted to the bar in 1790 and commenced practice in Plainfield, Connecticut.

Goddard was a member of the Connecticut House of Representatives from 1795 to 1801. He was elected as a Federalist to the Seventh Congress to fill the vacancy caused by the resignation of Elizur Goodrich. He was re-elected to the Eighth and Ninth Congresses and served from May 14, 1801, until his resignation in 1805 before the convening of the Ninth Congress. He was succeeded by Timothy Pitkin. He was again elected to the Connecticut State House of Representatives in 1807 and served as a speaker. He moved to Norwich, Connecticut in 1807 and resumed the practice of law. He was a presidential elector on the ticket of Clinton and Ingersoll in 1812, a delegate to the Hartford Convention in 1814–15, a justice of the Connecticut Supreme Court of Errors from June 1815 to June 1818, and mayor of Norwich from 1814 to 1834. He died in Norwich on May 2, 1842, and was buried in the city cemetery.

His son-in-law and former student Asa Child had a son Calvin Goddard Child whom he named after him.

He also taught his son Charles Backus Goddard.

U.S. House of Representatives
Preceded by Elizur Goodrich	Member of the U.S. House of Representatives from Connecticut's at-large congressional district 1801-1805	Succeeded by Lewis B. Sturges
