= Asa Child =

American attorney (1798–1858)

United States Attorney for the District of Connecticut
- In office 1829–1834
- President: Andrew Jackson
- Preceded by: Nathan Smith
- Succeeded by: William S. Holabird

Personal details
- Born: December 2, 1798 Norwich, Connecticut, US
- Died: May 11, 1858 (aged 59) Norwich, Connecticut, US
- Spouse: Alice Hart Goddard Child
- Children: Julia Goddard Child; Edward Child; Alice Hart Child; Calvin G. Child
- Education: Yale (1821)
- Profession: Lawyer

Asa Child (December 2, 1798 – May 11, 1858) was an American attorney who served as the United States Attorney for the District of Connecticut under Andrew Jackson.

== Biography ==
Asa Child was born on December 2, 1798. He was the oldest of nine children born to a farmer Rensselaer and Priscilla (Corbin) Child, of (North) Woodstock, Connecticut.

He began studying law, with Judge Calvin Goddard a graduate of Dartmouth, a former senator and at that point in time, the mayor of Norwich, Connecticut, which was followed by his Yale enrollment. During his time at Yale he learnt under Seth P. Staples a Yale graduate, from New Haven. He graduated in 1821 and was admitted to the bar in June, 1823.

He then began practicing law in Norwich, where he married Alice Hart daughter of Alice Cogswell (Hart) Goddard and his former teacher Calvin Godard and sister of George C. Goddard a fellow Yale graduate on February 13, 1826.

His life in Norwich was interrupted by his appointment as United States District Attorney for Connecticut under President Jackson, which involved his residence in Hartford from 1829 to 1831. He then returned to Norwich, but in 1843 removed to Baltimore, and thence to New York City in 1845.

=== Death ===
At the end of his life he returned to Norwich, where he died on May 11, 1858, when he was 60.

=== Children ===
His oldest child, his daughter Julia Goddard Child, was born on April 20, 1825, in Norwich. She married Levi W. Allen of South Hadley, Massachusetts, a great-grandson of Oliver Wolcott in 1852 and together they had two children. The second oldest, Edward Child, died in infancy. His third child, Alice Hart Child, died when she was 40 and she may have married Levi Allen after her sister died. Calvin Goddard Child named after Asa's father in law Calvin Goddard, would go on to become a judge and also fill his fathers position as United States Attorney for the District of Connecticut after graduating from his father's alma mater, Yale.
