= External quality assessment =

Examination of quality systems in a medical laboratory

External quality assessment (EQA), or external quality assessment schemes (EQAS), is an examination of the effectiveness of a laboratory's quality management system, typically referring specifically to medical laboratories. The term external refers to the fact that the laboratory's results are assessed by a third party. The most common EQA process is proficiency testing, in which an organization sends samples to a group of different laboratories and results are compared among the group. Retesting of the same sample by different laboratories and on-site visits to evaluate laboratory processes may also be part of an EQA scheme.

== Organization ==
Typically, an EQA scheme consists of several rounds per year. In each round participants receive test items, which are also called samples. The EQA organizer is also called the provider. The organizer ensures that the test items are sufficiently similar and homogeneous. The test items' properties and analyte concentrations are not disclosed to participants before the final report. The participants' results are then compared to check if any participant had a bias towards e.g. higher values, or an unexpected imprecision. At the end of each round, the EQA organizer sends out reports and/or certificates to the participating laboratories.

== Accreditation ==
Laboratories are often accredited for ISO 17025 and ISO 15189 compliance. Internationally, the International Laboratory Accreditation Cooperation establishes global recognition of these standards. Locally, conformance with ISO standards is checked by accreditation bodies. These often mandate, but always encourage laboratories to participate in EQA schemes.

Typically, EQA scheme organizers are accredited according to the ISO 17043 standard.

== Motivation ==
EQA or proficiency testing is different from quality assurance which, in a laboratory setting, is the total process whereby the quality of laboratory results can be guaranteed. This is because relying solely on the lab-internal quality management can create a false sense of safety.

Laboratories are instructed to treat proficiency testing samples in the same way as normal patient samples. For a laboratory, gaining and keeping the ISO 17025 accreditation status is of high commercial importance. For this reason, laboratory employees might treat EQA test items differently.

There are several ways in which PT samples may be given ‘special’ treatment. They may be handled by more experienced staff than those who examine typical routine samples, subjected to more rigorous checking procedures than normal, or results and information from other participants (collusion) may be sought before reporting. These practices must be discouraged by laboratory management. If the scheme organizers suspect collusion then the laboratories concerned will be contacted.

== Statistics & scoring ==
In most EQA schemes, laboratories receive scores for their results. The most popular score is the Z-score, also called standard deviation index (SDI). The score is given per analyte and per test item.

== Available schemes ==
PT/EQA is of paramount importance in food, water and medical testing where the impact of incorrect results can impact on people's health. Many countries have organisations with a government remit to protect people's health such as the Health Protection Agency in the United Kingdom.

Other very important sectors are mining: Ore value estimation is very important commercially, therefore its reliance is usually proven by laboratories with their participation in EQA schemes.

A wide range of global EQA schemes or proficiency testing schemes for laboratories are listed in the online database EPTIS, which is operated by the German Federal Institute for Materials Research.
