= Southeast Area Transit =

Connecticut bus service provider

Southeast Area Transit District
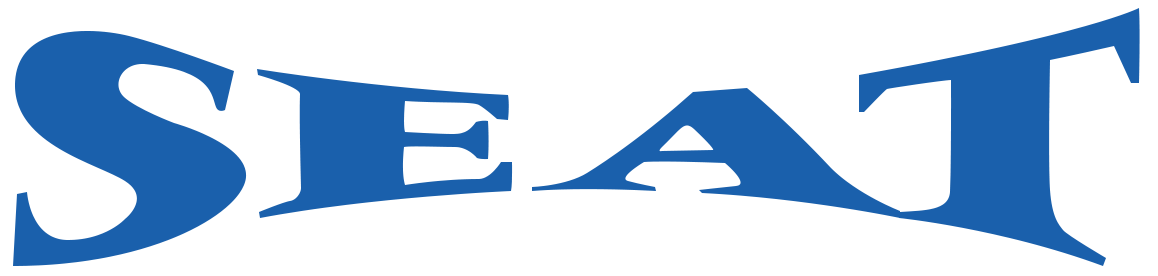

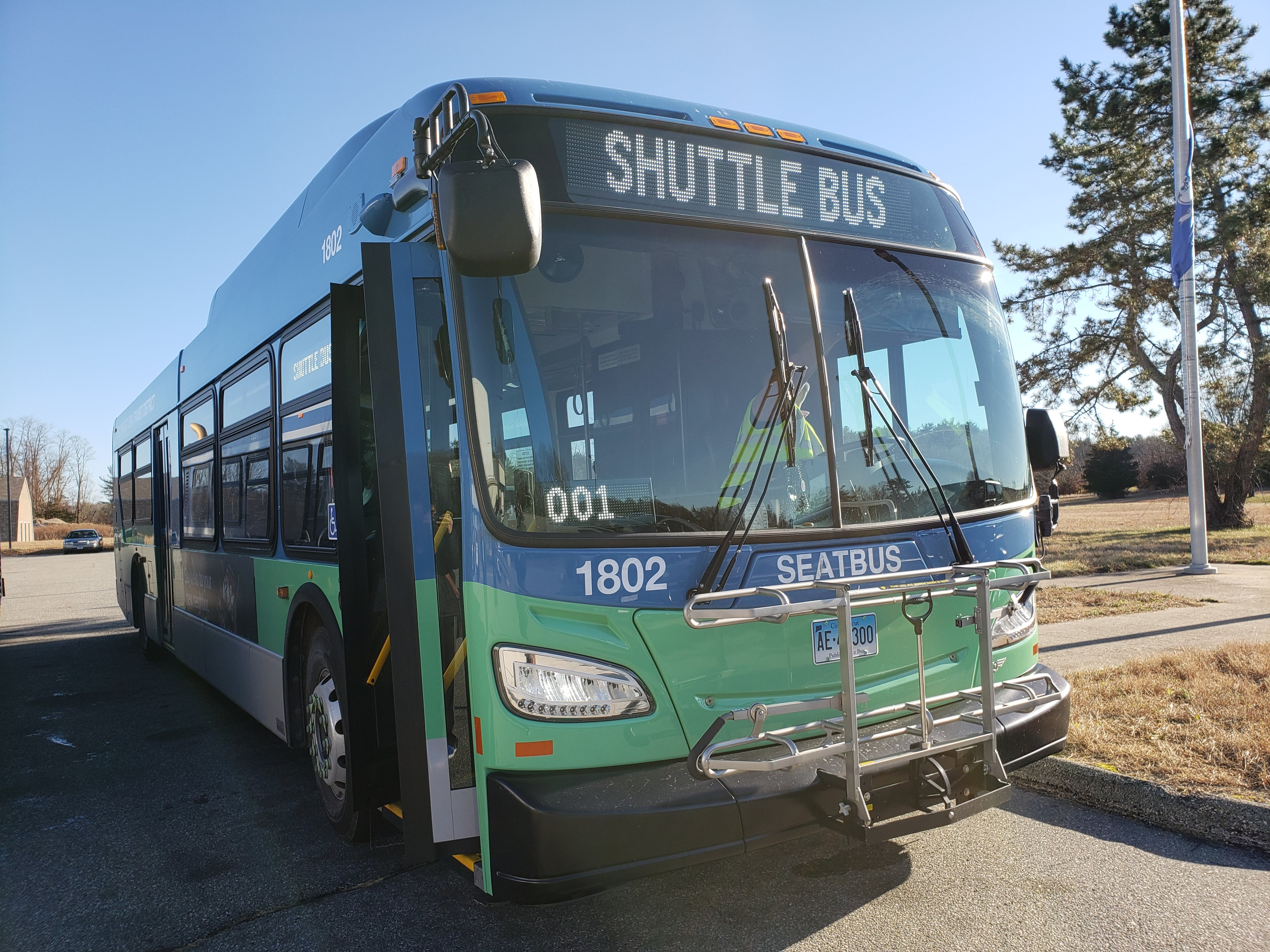
- SEAT New Flyer XD40 #1802 at SEAT's main facility along CT Route 12 in Preston.
- Parent: Towns of East Lyme, Griswold, Groton, Ledyard, Montville, New London, Norwich, Stonington and Waterford, cities of New London and Groton
- Founded: 1975 (service began in 1980)
- Headquarters: 21 Connecticut Route 12, Preston, CT 06365
- Service area: Norwich-New London Urbanized Area
- Service type: Local bus service, Amtrak Thruway
- Routes: 17 (plus three micro-transit service areas)
- Hubs: 2 (New London Union Station, Norwich Transportation Center)
- Fleet: 22 fixed-route, 7 demand-response
- Daily ridership: 3,888 (weekday); 1,363 (Saturday)
- Fuel type: Diesel, hybrid diesel-electric
- Annual budget: $9,110,072
- Website: Official Website

Southeast Area Transit (abbreviated to SEAT) is a provider of local bus service in eight towns and two cities in the southeastern portion of the U.S. state of Connecticut: East Lyme, Griswold, Groton (town and city), Ledyard, Montville, New London, Norwich, Stonington, and Waterford. Under contract to Amtrak, SEAT also provides Amtrak Thruway service from New London to Foxwoods.

A 2015 report co-authored with the Southeastern Connecticut Council of Governments (SCCOG) sketched out opportunities for "system expansion."

== Routes ==
SEAT operates the following bus routes:

Regional routes. Routes connecting major cities or towns in the region.

- 1: Norwich to New London via Route 32
- 2: Norwich to New London via Route 12 and Groton
- 3: New London to Niantic via Boston Post Road and Crossroads Wal-Mart
- 108: New London to Foxwoods via Groton and Old Mystic Village (also an Amtrak Thruway route)

Norwich/Jewett City. These routes, except Route 8, originate from the Norwich Transit Center.

- 4: Norwich Transit Center to Occum/Taftville
- 5: Norwich Transit Center to Norwich Business Park via Backus Hospital
- 6: Norwich Transit Center to Norwich Wal-Mart via Marcus Plaza
- 7: Norwich Transit Center to Hamilton Avenue, Uncas-on-Thames and Mohegan Sun
- 8: Lisbon Landing to Jewett City
- 9: Norwich Transit Center to Lisbon Landing via Route 12
- 980: Norwich Transit Center to Groton/New London Sub Base and Electric Boat
- 982: Norwich Transit Center to Foxwoods via State Route 2

New London/Groton. These routes, except Route 11, originate from the New London Railroad Station.

- 11: Groton Local
- 12: New London to Crystal Mall and NL Shopping Center
- 13: New London to L&M Hospital and Ocean Beach
- 14: New London to NL Mall, Waterford Commons, Crystal Mall and NL Shopping Center
- 15: New London/Waterford Local (nights only)

SEAT Connect Services (On-demand microtransit)

- Stonington HOP Service: Stonington area between Pawcatuck and Mystic along the CT Route 1 corridor
- Groton/Waterford HOP Service: eastern Groton area between Noank, Route 184 and Mystic and the Quaker Hill area of Waterford
- New London Smart Ride: service within the city of New London

== Fares ==
Fare category	Single Ride	Ten Ride Ticket Book	Four Hour Zip Pass	One Day Pass	Five Day Pass	Thirty-one Day Pass
Regular	US $1.75	US $17.50	US $2.50	US $3.50	US $14	US $40
Senior/Disabled	US $0.85	US $8.50	Not available			
ADA/Paratransit	US $3.50	US $35	Not available			

Children aged 5 and under and measuring 45 inches in height or below ride for free.

=== Transfers ===
One free transfer may be obtained with each fare. Transfers allow customers to complete a one way trip which requires multiple buses. Transfers are issued upon fare payment and are valid for one-and-a-half hours. Transfers cannot be used to make a round trip. Transfers are only accepted at the following designated Transfer Points:
Norwich Transportation Center, Lisbon Landing, Mohegan Sun, Foxwoods Resort Casino, New London Water Street, New London NSA, New London Eugene O’Neill and State Street Shelter, Groton Square, Groton Plaza Court, I-95 / Route 2 Commuter Lot (N. Stonington), Olde Mistick Village

== System Expansion ==
=== 2015 SEAT Bus Study ===
In 2015, SEAT and the Southeastern Connecticut Council of governments published the SEAT Bus Study, which described potential ways to improve efficiency and increase ridership. The study identified 3 potential options for future bus service with changed frequency, coverage area, and weekend service. All three of the proposed changes would have focused on simplifying and routes to be less circuitous. The most expansive option, "System Expansion C" would create new routes better. The final

The study concluded that Cost Neutral Plan A would best meet the goals of the study, though noted it would eliminate service in some areas. It was also identified that expansion of bus service would be ideal if funding allows.

== Fleet ==
Make & model	Year introduced	Fleet numbers	Photo
Ford Transit/Startrans Candidate	2019	1906-1907	
Gillig Low Floor 35'	2019	2001-2005	
Gillig Low Floor 29'	2019	1901-1904	
New Flyer XD40	2018	1801-1805	
New Flyer XD35	2018	1806-1811	
New Flyer XD40	2020	2006-2007	
Gillig Low Floor BRT HEV 40'	2013	1301	
Gillig Low Floor BRT HEV 35'	2013	1302	
Ford E450/Coach & Equipment Phoenix	2016	1601-1605	
