= Calvin G. Child =

American attorney (1834–1880)

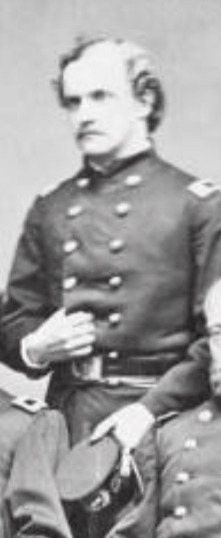

United States Attorney for the District of Connecticut
- In office March 1, 1870 – September 28, 1880
- President: Ulysses S. Grant; Rutherford B. Hayes
- Preceded by: Hiram Willey
- Succeeded by: Daniel Chadwick

Personal details
- Born: April 6, 1834 Norwich, Connecticut, US
- Died: September 28, 1880 (aged 46) Stamford, Connecticut, US
- Spouse: Kate Godfrey Child
- Children: 4
- Education: Columbia University Grammar School; Yale University (1855); Harvard Law School (1858)
- Profession: Lawyer

Military service
- Allegiance: United States
- Branch/service: United States Army
- Years of service: 1862–1864
- Rank: Lieutenant

Judge Calvin Goddard Child (April 6, 1834 – September 28, 1880) was an American attorney who served as the United States Attorney for the District of Connecticut from 1870 to 1880.

== Early life ==
Calvin Goddard Child was born in Norwich, Connecticut, on April 6, 1834. His father was Asa Child a former United States attorney for the district of Connecticut under President Andrew Jackson, and his mother was Alice H. Goddard the daughter of Judge Calvin Goddard for whom he was named. He was also a great-grandson of Dr. Joseph Bellamy.

He began his education in New York City at Columbia Grammar & Preparatory School, because his family moved there in 1845. He went to college at his father's alma mater, Yale, graduating in 1855. While at Yale, he was a member of Scroll and Key. He studied law in his father's office and in Harvard Law School where he graduated from in 1858, the same year he was admitted to the bar. He was married September 16, 1858, to Kate Godfrey, daughter of Captain Jonathan Godfrey, of Southport.

== Career ==
He began practicing law in Norwich, Connecticut from his residence and continued to do so until June 1864. For two years starting in May 1862, he was the private secretary to Governor Buckingham, being named Lieutenant and helping the governor with Connecticut's role in the Civil War. During his last year in Norwich he was also Judge of the City Court. In 1864 he opened an office in New York City, his residence being in Southport, Connecticut at the time. In 1867, he relocated both his office and his home to Stamford, Connecticut, where he formed a partnership with Joshua B. Ferris a fellow Yale graduate. He was appointed District Attorney for Connecticut on March 1, 1870, and held that position until his death.

== Personal life ==
After being in poor health for numerous years, in early 1880, he was stricken with apoplexy. He recovered enough to make a visit to the Hot Springs of Arkansas, under his doctors advice. At the end of August, while at Saratoga Springs, another attack seized him. He was brought home and lingered in great feebleness until his death, on September 28, when he was 46.
