= Guilford High School (Connecticut) =

Public school in Connecticut, United States

Location
- 605 New England Road; Guilford, Connecticut 06437; United States; 41°18′47″N 72°42′43″W

Information
- School type: Public high school
- Motto: Non Victoria Sed Facta (Latin); Not Victory But Deeds
- Established: 1886 (140 years ago)
- CEEB code: 070255
- Principal: Julia Chaffe
- Enrollment: 1,026 (2023-2024)
- Colors: Green and white
- Athletics conference: Southern Connecticut Conference
- Mascot: Grizzlies
- Rival: Daniel Hand
- Website: ghs.guilfordschools.org

Guilford High School (formally Guilford Senior High School) is a four-year public high school located in Guilford, Connecticut. Opened in 1886, the school colors are green and white and the school's mascot is the Grizzlies, formerly the Indians, after the Board of Education voted to change it on June 29, 2020.

In 2015, the town opened a new high school.

== Demographics ==
The 2022–2023 demographic profile is as follows: White 82%, Hispanic 8.3%, Asian American 4.8%, two or more races 3.4%, Black 1.5%, American Indian/Alaskan Native 0.1%, and Hawaiian Native/Pacific Islander 0.2%.

== Athletics and clubs ==
Guilford High School is part of the Southern Connecticut Conference (SCC), competing in the Hammonnasset division. The SCC is a division of the Connecticut Interscholastic Athletics Conference (CIAC).

As of 2024, GHS has 28 teams competing in 20 different sports.

Fall Sports: Football, Boys Soccer, Girls Soccer, Field Hockey, Volleyball, Boys Cross Country, Girls Cross Country, Girls Swim & Dive

Winter Sports: Boys Basketball, Girls Basketball, Wrestling, Boys Ice Hockey, Girls Ice Hockey, Indoor Track & Field, Boys Swim & Dive, Fencing, Skiing, Cheerleading

Spring Sports: Baseball, Softball, Boys Lacrosse, Girls Lacrosse, Boys Track & Field, Girls Track & Field, Boys Tennis, Girls Tennis, Golf, Crew

Wins in CIAC State Championships
Sport	Class	Year(s)
Baseball	L	2007
Basketball (girls)	L	2001, 2002, 2003
Cross country (boys)	MM	2005, 2010, 2012, 2015
Cross country (boys)	L	1980, 1986, 2003, 2004
Cross country (boys)	Open	2004
Cross country (girls)	MM	2004, 2005, 2006, 2007, 2008, 2009, 2010, 2011, 2021, 2022
Cross country (girls)	Open	2002, 2009
Field hockey	M	2018, 2019, 2021, 2024
Field hockey	L	1991 (Co-champions with Cheshire), 1997 (Co-champions with Simsbury)
Ice Hockey (boys)	III	2010
Ice Hockey (boys)	II	1994, 2017
Lacrosse (boys)	M	2025
Lacrosse (boys)	L	2026
Lacrosse (girls)	M	2021, 2022, 2023
Soccer (boys)	M	1969, 1973
Soccer (boys)	L	1976, 1977, 1978, 1980, 1983, 1985, 1986, 1989
Soccer (boys)	LL	1996, 2000
Soccer (girls)	M	1987, 1989 (Co-champions with Lyman Hall), 1990, 1991, 1992
Soccer (girls)	L	1984, 2003 (Co-champions with Farmington), 2013, 2019
Tennis (boys)	M	1977, 2010, 2014
Tennis (girls)	L	2022, 2023, 2026
Track and field (indoor, boys)	M	1980, 1981, 1982
Track and field (indoor, boys)	Open	1982 (Co-champions with Wilbur Cross)
Track and field (outdoor, boys)	L	1979
Track and field (outdoor, girls)	M	1982 (Co-champions with Montville)
Track and field (outdoor, girls)	L	1990
Wrestling	M	1994
Wrestling	L	1986

=== Debate ===
In 2013, the Guilford High School Debate Team came in top 10 in the Novice Division of the Connecticut Debate Association Tournament.

== Blackface incident ==
In 2019, a Guilford High School student attended a school football game against Hartford Public Schools in blackface.

== Academic accomplishments ==
- Designated Blue Ribbon School in 2019.
- Ranked as the 18th best school in the state of Connecticut by U.S. News & World Report in 2021.

== Notable alumni ==
- Will Aronson (1981-) composer, writer for musical theatre, and Tony Award winner
- Nick Fradiani (1985-) 2015 winner of American Idol
- Adam Greenberg (1981-) Major League Baseball player
- Becki Newton (1978-) actress
- Morris Pleasure (1962-) musician, singer, composer, producer
- David Allen Sibley (1961-) ornithologist and illustrator
- Jennifer Westfeldt (1970-) actress, screenwriter, and producer
