= International Scientific Communications =

American publisher of trade magazines

International Scientific Communications, Inc. (ISC) is an American publisher of trade magazines that was established in November 1968 as American Laboratory. Based out of Shelton, Connecticut, it launched its first journal, American Laboratory offering practical, applications-oriented information on the use of new kinds of laboratory instrumentation. It obtained its current name in 1971.

In 1982, ISC launched its editorial tabloid, American Biotechnology Laboratory. By the late 1990s, ISC had started additional publications, such as American Chemical Laboratory, China Laboratory, India Lab, American Genomics/Proteomics Technology and others.

The company was acquired in 2010 by San Francisco-based CompareNetworks.
