= Southern Connecticut Conference =

High school athletics conference

- Conference: CIAC
- Founded: 1994
- No. of teams: 23
- Region: New Haven County
- Official website: www.southernconnecticutconference.org

The Southern Connecticut Conference (SCC) is a high school athletics conference in Connecticut. The conference comprises schools located along the Long Island Sound in the New Haven area. The SCC is composed of 23 high schools, representing 16 communities, with over 23,000 students.

== History ==
In 1998, Career High School of New Haven joined the conference and was placed in the Housatonic Division. In 2004, the league again expanded when the Board of Governors voted to accept two Milford-based schools, Foran and Jonathan Law. Also in 2004, Bill O'Brien stepped down after serving 10 years as SCC Commissioner. He was replaced by Al Carbone. The SCC, having expanded to 23 member schools, decided to realign its divisional format for the 2004/2005 academic year. The league added a fourth division, Oronoque, also named after a Native American river in Southern Connecticut. The SCC also decided to realign its football-playing schools, primarily based on student enrollment. In 2009, Derby left the SCC to join the Naugatuck Valley League leaving the league with 22 member schools.

== Membership ==
=== Members ===
School	Location	Nickname	Colors
Amity Regional High School	Woodbridge, Connecticut	Spartans	
Branford High School	Branford, Connecticut	Hornets	
Career High School	New Haven, Connecticut	Panthers	
Cheshire High School	Cheshire, Connecticut	Rams	
Daniel Hand High School	Madison, Connecticut	Tigers	
East Haven High School	East Haven, Connecticut	Yellowjackets	
Fairfield College Preparatory School	Fairfield, Connecticut	Jesuits	
Foran High School	Milford, Connecticut	Lions	
Guilford High School	Guilford, Connecticut	Grizzlies	
Hamden High School	Hamden, Connecticut	Green Dragons	
Hillhouse High School	New Haven, Connecticut	Academics	
Jonathan Law High School	Milford, Connecticut	Lawmen	
Lauralton Hall	Milford, Connecticut	Crusaders	
Lyman Hall High School	Wallingford, Connecticut	Trojans	
Mercy High School	Middletown, Connecticut	Tigers	
North Haven High School	North Haven, Connecticut	Nighthawks	
Notre Dame High School	West Haven, Connecticut	Green Knights	
Sacred Heart Academy	Hamden, Connecticut	Pacers	
Sheehan High School	Wallingford, Connecticut	Titans	
Shelton High School	Shelton, Connecticut	Gaels	
West Haven High School	West Haven, Connecticut	Blue Devils	
Wilbur Cross High School	New Haven, Connecticut	Governors	
Xavier High School	Middletown, Connecticut	Falcons	

=== Former members ===
School	Location	Nickname	Colors
Derby High School	Derby, Connecticut	Red Raiders	

== Sports ==
SCC member schools participate in the following 20 sports throughout the academic year.

Fall

- Cross Country
- Field Hockey
- Football
- Soccer
- Swimming (Women)
- Volleyball (Women)

Winter

- Basketball
- Cheerleading
- Dance
- Gymnastics
- Ice Hockey
- Indoor Track
- Swimming (Men)
- Wrestling

Spring

- Baseball
- Golf
- Lacrosse
- Softball
- Tennis
- Track and Field
- Volleyball (Men)
