= Sean Desai =

American football coach (born 1983)

Cincinnati Bengals
- Title: Senior defensive assistant

Personal information
- Born: April 21, 1983 (age 43); Shelton, Connecticut, U.S.

Career information
- College: Boston University (2001–2004); Columbia (2005); Temple (2006–2008)

Career history
- Temple (2006–2009) Graduate assistant; Temple (2010) Outside linebackers coach & special teams coordinator; Miami (FL) (2011) Assistant director of football operations; Boston College (2012) Running backs coach & special teams coordinator; Chicago Bears (2013–2018) Defensive quality control coach; Chicago Bears (2019–2020) Safeties coach; Chicago Bears (2021) Defensive coordinator; Seattle Seahawks (2022) Associate head coach & defensive assistant; Philadelphia Eagles (2023) Defensive coordinator; Los Angeles Rams (2024) Senior defensive assistant; Cincinnati Bengals (2025–present) Senior defensive assistant
- Coaching profile at Pro Football Reference

Sean Desai (born April 21, 1983) is an American football coach who is a senior defensive assistant for the Cincinnati Bengals of the National Football League (NFL). He is the first NFL coordinator of Indian descent. He previously served as the defensive coordinator for the Philadelphia Eagles, as well as an assistant coach for the Chicago Bears, Seattle Seahawks, Boston College, University of Miami and Temple University.

== Early life ==
Desai grew up in Shelton, Connecticut into Gujarati family. His father was from a village in Gujarat, while his mother was from Ahmedabad. He attended Shelton High School, where he played defensive back on a state championship team with future NFL quarterback Dan Orlovsky. Desai did not play college football, instead attending Boston University with the intention of becoming an orthopedist. He graduated in 3 years with a double-major in philosophy and political science and a minor in biology, and gained his first exposure to coaching by returning home some weekends to volunteer as an assistant coach for his younger brother’s freshman football team.

Desai later switched his focus to education, receiving a Master’s degree in teaching from Columbia University, shadowing their football team’s coaching staff for one semester. When he was unable to obtain an entry-level position with any NFL teams, he decided to attend Temple University to receive a doctorate in education.

== Coaching career ==
=== Temple ===
Desai began his coaching career at Temple University, where he was a graduate student, eventually obtaining a PhD in educational administration. Initially volunteering with Temple’s recruiting staff, Desai was later hired part-time as a graduate assistant by head coach Al Golden, initially helping players with their academics, and later working with the defense and special teams. He also worked as an adjunct professor in Temple’s education department for two years, and was prepared to leave coaching to become a full-time professor at George Washington University in 2009; however, Golden pled Desai to stay with the assurance of a full-time coaching position the following season. In 2010, he was promoted to outside linebackers coach and special teams coordinator for the Owls, making him the youngest Division 1 coordinator at 27 years old.

=== Miami ===
In 2011, Desai joined the University of Miami as their assistant director of football operations.

=== Boston College ===
In 2012, Desai joined as the running backs coach and special teams coordinator at Boston College.

=== Chicago Bears ===
In 2013, Desai was hired by the Chicago Bears as a quality control assistant under head coach Marc Trestman. As a quality control assistant, he worked with the Bears' defensive backs and linebackers while also assisting the special teams coaches. Desai was retained by head coach John Fox in 2015 and Matt Nagy in 2018. On February 8, 2019, Desai was promoted to safeties coaches. The Bears went 8–8 in 2019 and missed the playoffs. Under his coaching, Eddie Jackson was named to the Pro Bowl. On January 22, 2021, Desai was promoted to defensive coordinator, replacing Chuck Pagano, following his retirement. Desai became the first person of Indian descent to become a coordinator in the National Football League. He was not retained by the team following the departure of head coach Matt Nagy after the 2021 season.

=== Seattle Seahawks ===
On February 11, 2022, Desai was hired by the Seattle Seahawks as an associate defensive head coach.

=== Philadelphia Eagles ===
On February 28, 2023, Desai was hired by the Philadelphia Eagles as their defensive coordinator under head coach Nick Sirianni, replacing Jonathan Gannon, who departed to become the head coach of the Arizona Cardinals.

Despite the Eagles being 10–3 on the season, head coach Nick Sirianni announced on December 17, 2023, that senior defensive assistant Matt Patricia would be taking over defensive play calling from Desai. Desai was moved to a lesser position in the coaches' box, bolstered after the Eagles' defense let up 42 points and 33 points in back-to-back weeks, ranking as the worst third down defense in the NFL. The Philadelphia Inquirer reported that Desai did not "carry himself with confidence...[and] some players started to feel that." Crossing Broad reported that, following the move, Desai was not part of the team's coaches meetings.

In less than a year of holding his position, after losing 6 of their last 7 games, including a Wild Card playoff game, Sirianni fired Desai on January 21, 2024.

=== Los Angeles Rams ===
On February 25, 2024, Desai was hired by the Rams as a senior defensive assistant.

=== Cincinnati Bengals ===
On February 24, 2025, Desai was hired by the Cincinnati Bengals as a senior defensive assistant.

== Personal life ==
Desai received his undergraduate degree in philosophy and political science, with a minor in biology, from Boston University in 2004. Desai earned a master's degree in higher and postsecondary education from Columbia University in 2005. Desai earned his doctorate in educational administration in 2008 at Temple University, and was an adjunct professor for two years.
