= Hillhouse High School =

James Hillhouse High School
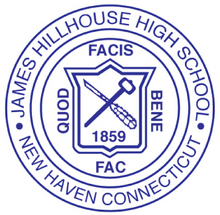

Location
- 480 Sherman Parkway; New Haven, Connecticut 06511; United States; 41°19′19″N 72°56′23″W

Information
- Founded: 1859 (167 years ago)
- School district: New Haven Public Schools
- CEEB code: 070495
- Principal: Mark Sweeting
- Teaching staff: 77.00 (FTE)
- Grades: 9-12
- Enrollment: 1,101 (2023-2024)
- Student to teacher ratio: 14.30
- Colors: Blue and white
- Athletics conference: Southern Connecticut Conference
- Mascot: Bulldog
- Team name: Academics
- Website: jameshillhouse.nhps.net/o/jameshillhouse

James Hillhouse High School is a four-year comprehensive public high school in New Haven, Connecticut. It serves grades 9–12. Formerly New Haven High School, it is the oldest public high school in New Haven, and is part of the New Haven Public Schools.

== History ==
Established in 1859 as New Haven High School, Hillhouse High School is New Haven's oldest public high school. Originally located on Orange Street, it adopted its nickname, "The Academics", in acknowledgment of its close association with Yale University.

In 1863, the school was moved to a building at Orange and Wall Streets, which was replaced in 1871 by a new school.

The school is named in honor of James Hillhouse of New Haven, who represented Connecticut in the U.S. Congress in the early years of the United States' existence as a nation, serving as both a Representative and a Senator.

For many years, Hillhouse served not only New Haven but also suburban towns around the city that did not have high schools of their own. Its peak enrollment was nearly 5,000 students, when the school had to conduct double sessions to accommodate the large enrollment.

== Statistics ==
The school includes grades 9 through 12 and enrolls approximately 1,000 students.

== Athletics ==
Hillhouse became involved in athletic competition as early as 1866, when some boys formed a club to play a sport that is described as having "resembled rugby and soccer." By 1884, students were participating in several sports, including modern football, which had been invented by Walter Camp of New Haven. Team competition in baseball, tennis, ice hockey, indoor polo and yacht racing also had been established around this time. Basketball was introduced around the beginning of the 20th century.

Hillhouse football teams have won 17 state championships, ranking the school third in the state for football championships. The boys’ and girls’ basketball teams have a combined total 33 state championships. 24 for the boys and 9 for the girls. The boys’ and girls’ track teams also have more than 25 state championships between them. The Academics also have won state championships in baseball, swimming, ice hockey and tennis.

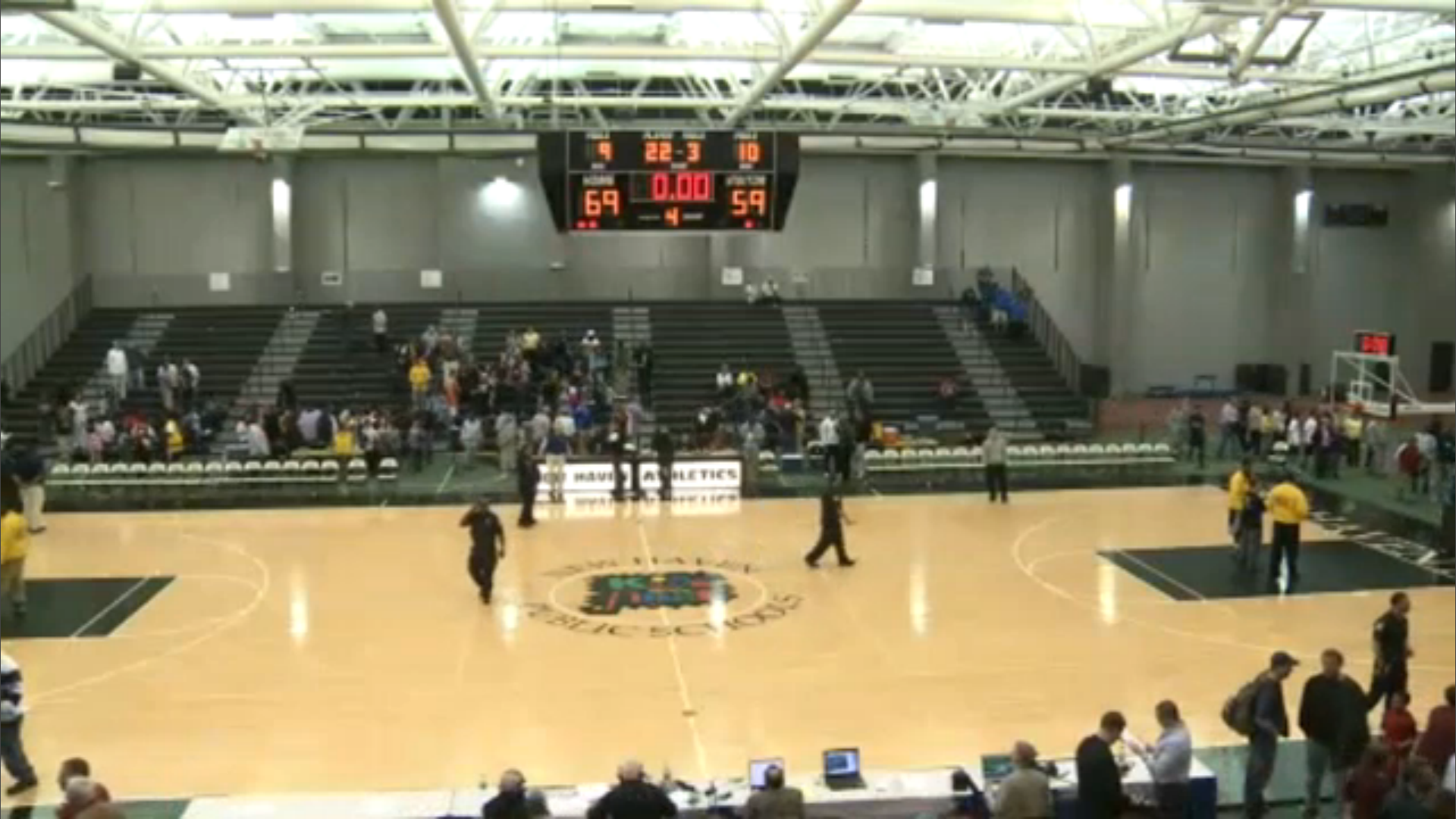
Floyd Little Athletic Center after a high school basketball game

In 1999, a grant was provided by the Connecticut Association of Schools to construct a fieldhouse for sports. Construction was finished in 2002, and it was named the New Haven Athletic Center, later to become the Floyd Little Athletic Center in 2011. The 115,000-square-foot (10,700 m^{2}) Athletic Center houses events for basketball, indoor track, and tennis. It has a capacity of 3,500 seats.

In 2016, the school inaugurated a new football field, Bowen field.

The school's official colors are blue and white and the mascot is a bulldog due to the school's early close association with Yale University. The school competes in the Hammonasset Division of the Southern Connecticut Conference and the sports offered are:

=== Fall ===
- Football
- Boys' Soccer (co-op with Hill Regional Career High School)
- Girls' Soccer (co-op with Wilbur Cross High School)
- Cross Country
- Cheerleading
- Volleyball

=== Winter ===
- Boys' Basketball
- Girls' Basketball
- Indoor Track

=== Spring ===
- Baseball
- Softball
- Golf
- Outdoor Track

The school is known for having one of the best Basketball teams in the state winning the state championship many years.

== Notable alumni ==
- Bob Barthelson, baseball pitcher
- Albie Booth, football player
- Ernest Borgnine, actor
- Raymond C. Bowen, president of LaGuardia Community College
- Joseph Payne Brennan, author
- Desmond Claude, basketball player
- John C. Daniels, mayor of New Haven
- Chad Dawson, boxer
- Lou DeFilippo (1916–2000), professional football player and coach
- Agnes G. Doody, professor of speech communication
- Pete Falsey, basketball player
- Harrison Fitch, basketball player
- Robert Giaimo, U.S. congressman
- John Francis Hackett, Catholic prelate
- Louis Harris, pollster
- Harry Mortimer Hubbell, classical scholar
- John Huggins, political activist
- Levi Jackson, first African-American to be captain of the football team at Yale University
- Joan R. Kemler, the first woman to serve as Connecticut state treasurer (1986–87)
- Richard C. Lee, mayor of New Haven
- Floyd Little, football player
- Paul McCracken, basketball player
- Kevin McKeown, mayor of Santa Monica, California
- Constance Baker Motley, civil rights activist
- Maurice Podoloff, first president of the National Basketball Association
- Judith Schiff, archivist
- Princess Oyama Sutematsu, Japanese socialite
- Vincent Scully, architectural historian
- William Starkweather, artist
- Raymond St. Jacques, actor
- Dick Tettelbach, baseball player
- George Weiss, MLB executive
- Terrell Wilks, runner
- Zhan Tianyou, railroad executive
