= Worthington Hooker School =

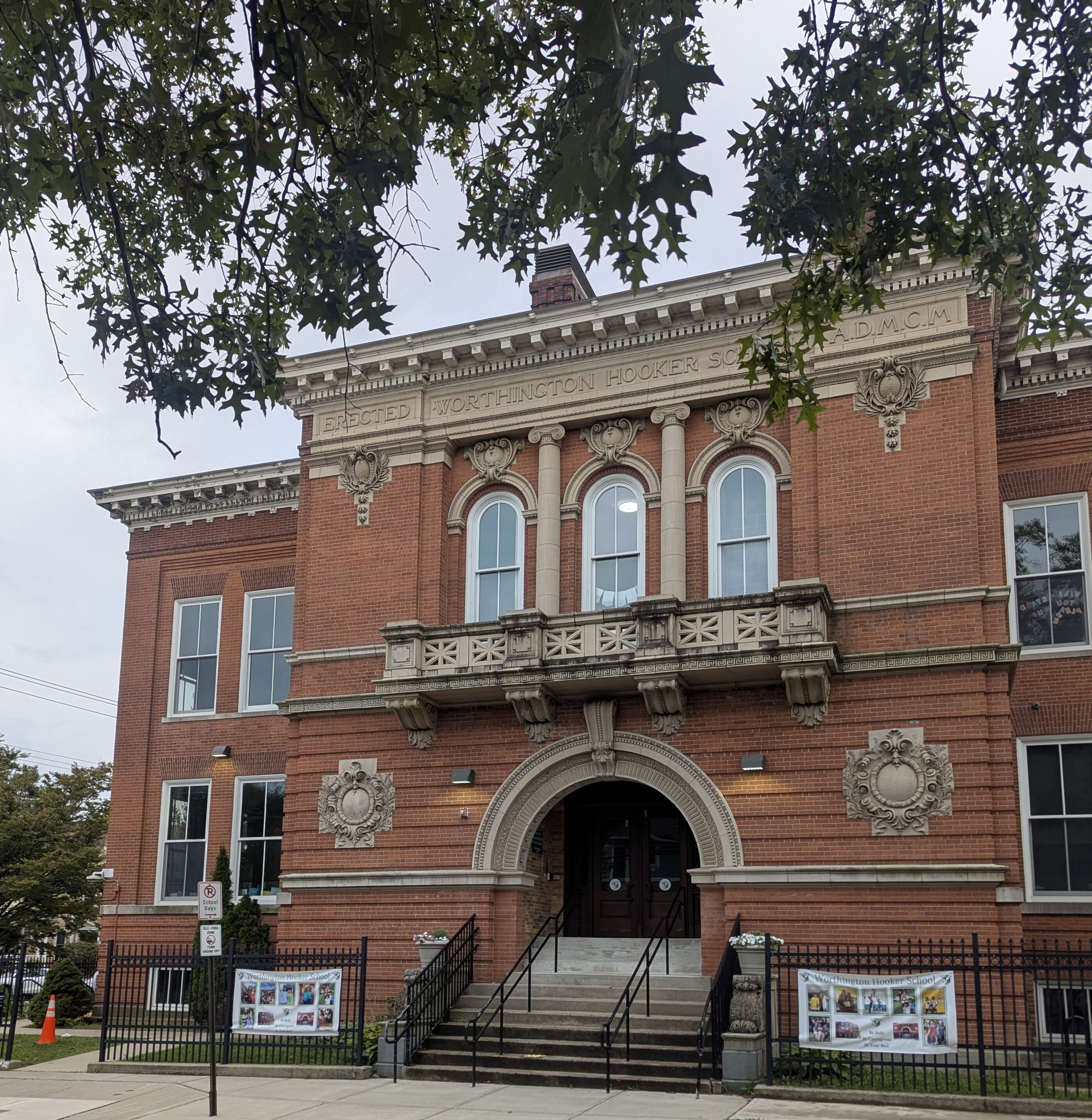
- Worthington Hooker School, 2025

Location
- New Haven, Connecticut; United States
- Coordinates: 41.324°N 72.9143°W

Information
- Other name: WHS
- Type: Public elementary and middle school
- School district: New Haven Public Schools
- NCES School ID: 090279000588
- Principal: Margaret Mary Gethings
- Teaching staff: 27.60 (on an FTE basis)
- Grades: KG–8
- Enrollment: 444 (2016-2017)
- Student to teacher ratio: 16.09
- Campuses: 2
- Colors: Green and White
- Mascot: Lion
- Website: www.worthingtonhookerschool.weebly.com

Worthington Hooker School (WHS) is a public elementary and middle school in New Haven, Connecticut, United States. It is part of the New Haven Public Schools district and is named after former Yale University professor and physician Dr. Worthington Hooker (1806–1867). It serves students from kindergarten through eighth grade in two separate buildings for its elementary and middle school provision.

The school also reports the highest achievement of the city's K-8 public schools.

The original school building at 180 Canner Street, which now houses the lower school, was erected in 1900. It currently houses kindergarten through grade 2. As this school building was not large enough to encompass all nine grades, grades 3-8 were formerly located in the former Saint Stanislaus School building at 804 State Street. As of summer 2007, renovations of the main school building had been completed and efforts were under way to build a new 60,000-square-foot (5,600 m^{2}) school building for the middle school on nearby Whitney Avenue. Planned construction of the new middle school was delayed for several years due to opposition by neighbors who objected to the use of "spot zoning" to allow construction of a school in a residential neighborhood and sued to block the project. An August 2007 unanimous decision by the Connecticut Supreme Court allowed the project to proceed, based on a finding that the city had not abused its zoning authority. The new middle school building for grades 3 through 8 was completed in 2009 at a cost of $36.5 million and officially opened on December 21, 2009.

The 180 Canner Street building is a contributing property in the Whitney Avenue Historic District, listed on the National Register of Historic Places.
