= NHPS =

NHPS may refer to:

- New Haven Public Schools, Connecticut
- National Health Protection Scheme in India
