= Hill Regional Career High School =

Location
- 140 Legion Avenue; New Haven, Connecticut 06519; United States; 41°18′23″N 72°56′25″W

Information
- CEEB code: 070488
- Principal: Madeline Negron
- Grades: 9–12
- Enrollment: 638 (2023-2024)
- Colors: Purple and yellow
- Athletics conference: Southern Connecticut Conference
- Mascot: Panther
- Rivals: Lyman Hall, Wilbur Cross
- Website: www.careerhighschool.org

Hill Regional Career High School is a magnet high school located in the Hill area of New Haven, Connecticut, United States. Its original name was Lee High School, named after one of New Haven's most famous mayors, Richard C. Lee. The school's curriculum is aligned with national, state and district standards, as well as providing career exploration programs to prepare students for entry into the fields of business/technology and health/science.

== Athletics ==
CIAC State Championship Wins
Sport	Class	Year(s)
Basketball (boys)	LL	1976
Basketball (boys)	L	2012
Basketball (girls)	L	1975
Basketball (girls)	LL	1977, 1978, 2008, 2011
Basketball (girls)	M	2003
Track and field (indoor, girls)	S	2004, 2005
Track and field (outdoor, girls)	M	2005, 2010

== Notable alumni ==
- Thomas J. Gibson, chancellor of the University of Wisconsin–Milwaukee and the University of Wisconsin–Stevens Point
- Tony Sparano, former head coach of the Miami Dolphins
