= New Haven Academy =

Location
- 444 Orange Street; New Haven, Connecticut 06511; United States
- Coordinates: 41.312°N 72.915°W

Information
- Type: Public school
- Motto: Think Critically - Be Responsible - Get Involved
- Established: 2003
- School district: New Haven Public Schools
- Director: Meredith Gavrin
- Principal: Gregory Baldwin
- Grades: 9-12
- Enrollment: 330
- Mascot: White tiger
- Newspaper: Roaring Record
- Website: School homepage

New Haven Academy is a four-year, ninth through twelfth grade high school in New Haven, CT. New Haven Academy was founded by Gregory Baldwin and Meredith Gavrin in 2003 as an interdistrict magnet school and part of New Haven Public Schools. The school provides a college preparatory education modeled for Collaborative Education (ICE), a New York City school.

Enrollment in the 2017-2018 year is approximately 280.

== Educational affiliations and partnerships ==
New Haven Academy is a member of the Coalition of Essential Schools (CES). New Haven Academy has a partnership with Facing History and Ourselves. Ninth and tenth graders take Facing History classes to explore concepts of history, identity, race and discrimination.

Upperclassman may be eligible to take undergraduate courses for college credit through partnerships with Yale University, Quinnipiac University, Southern Connecticut State University, and Gateway Community College. Students participate in internships within community businesses. A Student Action Project is required for graduation.
