= Adam Greenberg (baseball) =

American baseball player (born 1981)

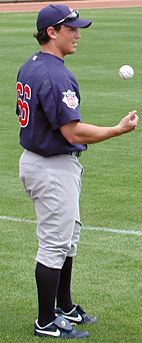
- Greenberg with the Chicago Cubs in 2005
- Outfielder
- Born: February 21, 1981 (age 45); New Haven, Connecticut, U.S.
- Batted: Left Threw: Right

MLB debut
- July 9, 2005, for the Chicago Cubs

Last MLB appearance
- October 2, 2012, for the Miami Marlins

MLB statistics
- Batting average: .000
- On-base percentage: .500
- At bats: 1
- Plate appearances: 2
- Stats at Baseball Reference

Teams
- Chicago Cubs (2005); Miami Marlins (2012)

Adam Daniel Greenberg (born February 21, 1981) is an American former professional baseball outfielder. He played in Major League Baseball (MLB) for the Chicago Cubs and Miami Marlins.

He was hit in the head in his major league debut on the first pitch of his first plate appearance. He suffered a compound skull fracture from the pitch.

Greenberg was one of two players in league history to be hit by a pitch in their only plate appearance without ever taking the field. However, a successful online petition drive in 2012 led to him getting signed by the Miami Marlins to a one-day contract. He had one at-bat for the Marlins and struck out on three pitches. He agreed to a minor league contract with the Baltimore Orioles for 2013, but the option was not pursued.

He also played parts of five seasons with the Bridgeport Bluefish of the Atlantic League of Professional Baseball near his hometown.

== Early life and high school ==
Greenberg is the son of Wendy and Mark Greenberg. He is Jewish. He attended Guilford High School in Guilford, Connecticut and was a four-year letterman on Guilford's baseball, basketball, and soccer teams.

Greenberg was baseball team captain as a junior and senior, four-time All-conference and all-area, and was the first player in Connecticut history to be named to four all-state teams.

Greenberg also served as soccer team captain for 1998 and 1999, and was a striker and four-year starter. Greenberg was a three-time all-conference, all-area, and all-state selection. He was named all-New England and All-America in 1998, during which season he set the school season record with 17 assists. Greenberg was also the team and area most valuable player in 1998, and helped lead Guilford to the state soccer title in 1996. Greenberg holds the school record for career assists, with 33.

== College career ==
Greenberg went to college at the University of North Carolina at Chapel Hill. There, he played college baseball for the North Carolina Tar Heels in the Atlantic Coast Conference (ACC). After the 2001 season, he played collegiate summer baseball with the Chatham A's of the Cape Cod Baseball League.

As a junior in 2002, he hit .337, stole 35 bases, scored 80 runs, homered 17 times, and again led the ACC with seven triples. He was named to the All-Conference Team. In 2002, he was named a Jewish Sports Review College Baseball First Team All-American.

== Professional career ==
=== Chicago Cubs ===
==== Minor leagues ====
Greenberg was selected by the Chicago Cubs in the ninth round (273rd overall) of the 2002 Major League Baseball draft. In 2002, Greenberg hit .224 for the Lansing Lugnuts, and .384/.500/.575 in 21 games for the Daytona Cubs, swiping 15 bases in 17 tries.

Greenberg spent the 2003 season with Daytona and put up a .299/.387/.410 line, stealing 26 bases in 35 attempts. In 2003, when Executive Editor of Baseball America Jim Callis was asked whether he thought Greenberg had a chance to be a starter, or was destined to be a backup, he responded: "Very good character guy, often compared to John Cangelosi, more of a fourth or fifth outfielder."

In 2004, Greenberg hit .291 with a .381 OBP for Daytona, with 12 triples in 91 games (tying for the Florida State League lead), and moved up to the West Tenn Diamond Jaxx, where he put up a .274 batting average in 33 games. His season ended with the Iowa Cubs. Overall, his 14 triples tied him for third in the minor leagues. Greenberg began 2005 with West Tennessee, hitting .269 with a .386 on-base percentage with nine triples and 15 steals. He spent three months of the winter playing baseball in Venezuela, playing center field and leading off.

==== Major leagues ====
"The sound, the way he went down — the first thing that went through your mind was, 'This guy is dead.'"

— Valerio de los Santos, after hitting Adam Greenberg in the head with a fastball

On July 7, 2005, Greenberg was called up to the Cubs' major league team from their West Tennessee Double-A affiliate. Pinch hitting in the ninth inning against the Florida Marlins, in a game on July 9, Greenberg was hit directly in the back of his head by a 92 mph (148 km/h) fastball on the very first pitch from Valerio de los Santos. Greenberg suffered a concussion and a skull fracture as a result of the beaning and was immediately removed from the game and taken to a hospital. Carlos Zambrano was sent in to pinch-run for Greenberg and eventually came around to score the Cubs' fifth run in an 8–2 victory.

De los Santos called to check on him and apologize. As a result of the injury, Greenberg couldn’t sleep upright or even bend down to tie his shoes without losing his balance. He spent the rest of the 2005 season on the 15-day disabled list, and continued to suffer from positional vertigo, terrible headaches, nausea, double vision and dizziness.

In 2006, Greenberg hit .179 for the Diamond Jaxx and .118 for Iowa, and was released by the Cubs organization on June 2, 2006. Mike Downey of the Chicago Tribune, in an interview on June 6, 2006, compared him to Moonlight Graham, who 100 years earlier had appeared in his only Major League game, only to not get an official at-bat, a story recounted in the film Field of Dreams. Greenberg said in the interview, "If that was the extent of my time as a baseball player, just that one very strange little moment, well, there's nothing more I can do about it."

=== Los Angeles Dodgers ===
Signed by the Los Angeles Dodgers a few days later, Greenberg was assigned to the Jacksonville Suns, hitting .228, but had a .387 on-base percentage (his minor league average), as he had more walks than hits. He also hit well against lefties, with a .455 batting average, and hit .313 with runners on base.

=== Kansas City Royals ===
Following his stint in the Dodgers' farm system, Greenberg played for the Kansas City Royals organization, agreeing to terms with Greenberg on a minor league contract on December 5, 2006.

Greenberg played the 2007 season with the Royals' Double-A affiliate, the Wichita Wranglers of the Texas League. He batted .266 with a .373 on-base percentage (10th in the league), a league-leading 11 triples, 13 sacrifice hits (second in the league), 74 walks (tied for fourth in the league), and 23 stolen bases (fifth in the league) in 467 at bats, while leading the team with 73 runs scored.

On November 25, 2007, the Royals re-signed Greenberg to another minor league contract. Unable to gain a spot in the Triple-A Omaha Royals outfield, Greenberg was granted free agency by Kansas City on March 28, 2008.

=== Bridgeport Bluefish ===
Greenberg subsequently had a brief stint with the Bridgeport Bluefish of the independent Atlantic League of Professional Baseball, near his hometown of Guilford. He made 13 appearances for the team, in which he batted .289 with a .450 on-base percentage, five RBI, and two stolen bases.

=== Los Angeles Angels of Anaheim ===
On May 28, 2008, Greenberg signed a minor league contract with the Los Angeles Angels of Anaheim, and was assigned to the Double-A Arkansas Travelers. There, he batted .271 with a .361 on-base percentage, two home runs, 15 RBI, and 16 stolen bases across 262 at-bats.

=== Bridgeport Bluefish (second stint) ===
On February 23, 2009, Greenberg signed a minor league contract with the Cincinnati Reds and was invited to minor league spring training. He did not make the team in spring training, and rejoined the Bridgeport Bluefish. In an August 8, 2009, game against the Lancaster Barnstormers, Jim Heuser's first pitch sailed behind Greenberg, who yelled out to Heuser. Greenberg was then drilled by a 2–2 pitch and went to charge the mound, but pulled back. Both benches cleared and there was a shove or two in the middle of the pack. In 130 appearances for the team, Greenberg batted .248/.334/.335 with three home runs and 42 RBI; he also had 53 steals, which set the team's single-season record.

Greenberg finished the 2010 season with the Bluefish batting .258/.384/.344 with four home runs, 39 RBI, and 44 stolen bases in 105 games, including a team-high 75 walks. He played outfield for the Bluefish again in 2011, his fourth year with the team. He faced De los Santos, who was pitching for the Long Island Ducks, the same pitcher who had hit him in the head in his sole Major League at-bat, and subsequently singled in this appearance. Greenberg said:

It was a big deal. As much as I might try to pretend it wasn't. It's been five and a half years, and to face him again in a game that meant something and get the result, to get a hit off him, it was a special moment. ... You have the what-if stuff, 'what if he threw that first pitch for a strike five and a half years ago?'

Greenberg later went hitless in his seven remaining at-bats against De los Santos throughout the course of the season. He led the Bluefish in several categories in the 2011 season, including triples, walks and stolen bases.

=== Miami Marlins ===
In 2012, a Chicago Cubs fan started an online petition to get Greenberg another Major League plate appearance. The campaign succeeded when the Miami Marlins offered him a one-day contract to play in their October 2, 2012, home game against the New York Mets. The contract was worth $2,623, which was donated to an organization that researched brain trauma in athletes. Prior to the game, Marlins manager Ozzie Guillén considered making Greenberg the leadoff hitter and starting him in left field, but then decided he would try to have him bat in the middle of the game and was not sure if he would allow him to run the bases. Greenberg led off the bottom of the sixth inning as a pinch hitter. The Aerosmith song "Dream On" was played through the stadium's public address system as Greenberg walked to home plate and the crowd gave him a standing ovation. He was struck out by Mets knuckleballer and eventual Cy Young Award winner R. A. Dickey on three pitches and was removed from the lineup at the end of the inning. Greenberg said after the game, "It was magical. The energy that was in the stadium was something that I have never experienced in my life, and I don't know if I'll ever experience that again." He also said he wanted to continue his Major League career and hoped he would be invited to a team's spring training in 2013, ideally with the Marlins.

Topps made a Greenberg baseball card for their 2013 series.

=== Bridgeport Bluefish (third stint) ===
On December 20, 2012, Greenberg agreed to a minor league contract with the Baltimore Orioles organization. He did not make the team out of spring training and once again returned to the Bridgeport Bluefish. In 30 contests for the Bluefish, Greenberg slashed .220/.351/.303 with seven RBI and seven stolen bases.

Greenberg officially announced his retirement from professional baseball on February 5, 2014.

== Team Israel ==
Greenberg played for the Israeli national baseball team during the 2013 World Baseball Classic qualifier. Greenberg entered the first game of the tournament as a defensive replacement for left field, and walked during his sole plate appearance. During the second game, Greenberg once again entered as a defensive replacement in left field, and did not have an at bat. Greenberg did not appear in the third and final game.

== National Jewish Sports Hall of Fame ==
In 2014, he was inducted into the National Jewish Sports Hall of Fame.

== Political career ==
In April 2018, Greenberg announced his candidacy for Connecticut's 12th Senate district as a Republican. Ted Kennedy Jr., son of former U.S. Senator Ted Kennedy, announced that he would not run for another term. He lost to Democrat Christine Cohen.

== See also ==
- List of Jewish Major League Baseball players
