= William Starkweather =

American painter

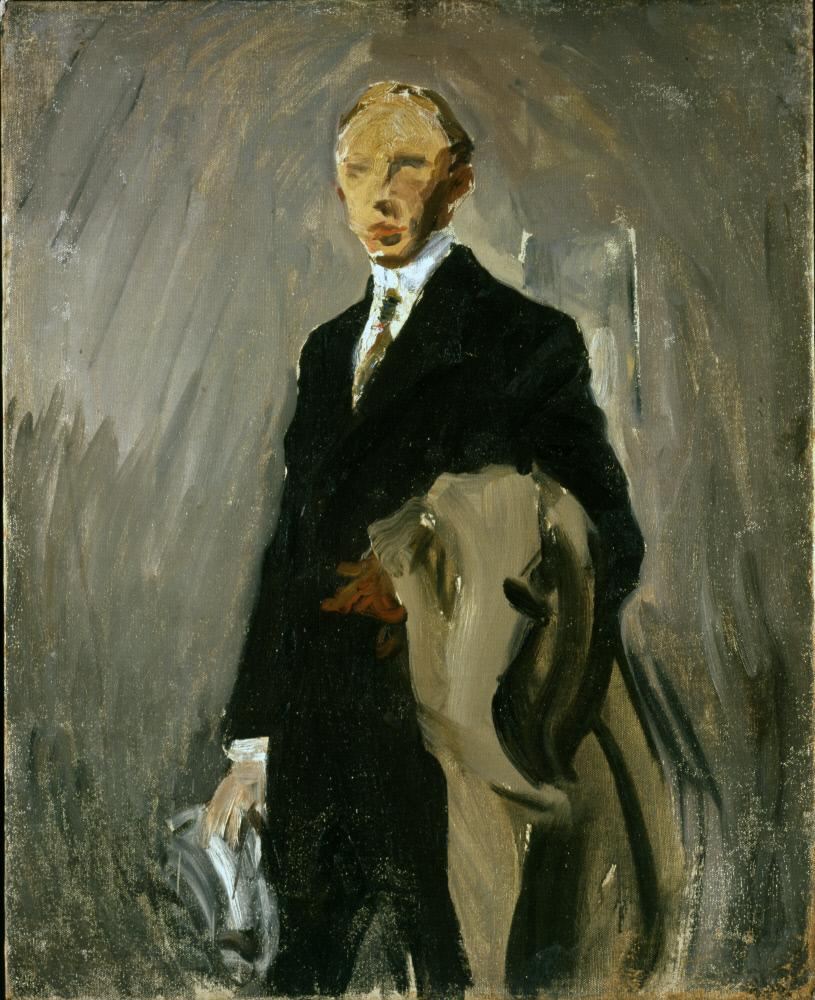
Portrait of William E. B. Starkweather by Joaquín Sorolla

William Edward Bloomfield Starkweather (1879 - 1969) was a painter, teacher, and writer, known for impressionist landscape paintings and book illustrations. He is also known for his research and writings on other painters, and was at one time considered "one of the greatest authorities on Goya".

== Early life ==
The details of Starkweather’s early childhood remain unclear. Records show that he was born William Edward Bloomfield in Edinburgh, Scotland on May 16, 1879, but the artist found evidence that he was actually born on May 10, 1876, in Belfast, Ireland. He immigrated to the United States with his mother in 1884. His mother died shortly afterwards, and he was adopted by John and Hannah Starkweather of New Haven, Connecticut.

== Education ==
After graduating from Hillhouse High School in New Haven, Connecticut, Starkweather studied at the Art Students' League in New York, where he studied with John Henry Twachtman, a member of the group of American Impressionists known as “the Ten”. It was most likely during this period that Starkweather developed his interest in light and color integral to his career. In November 1899, he began his studies at the Académie Colarossi in Paris. Starkweather was heavily influenced by the color and brush work of Spanish painter Joaquín Sorolla y Bastida, whose work he saw at the Exposition Universelle.

== Maturity ==
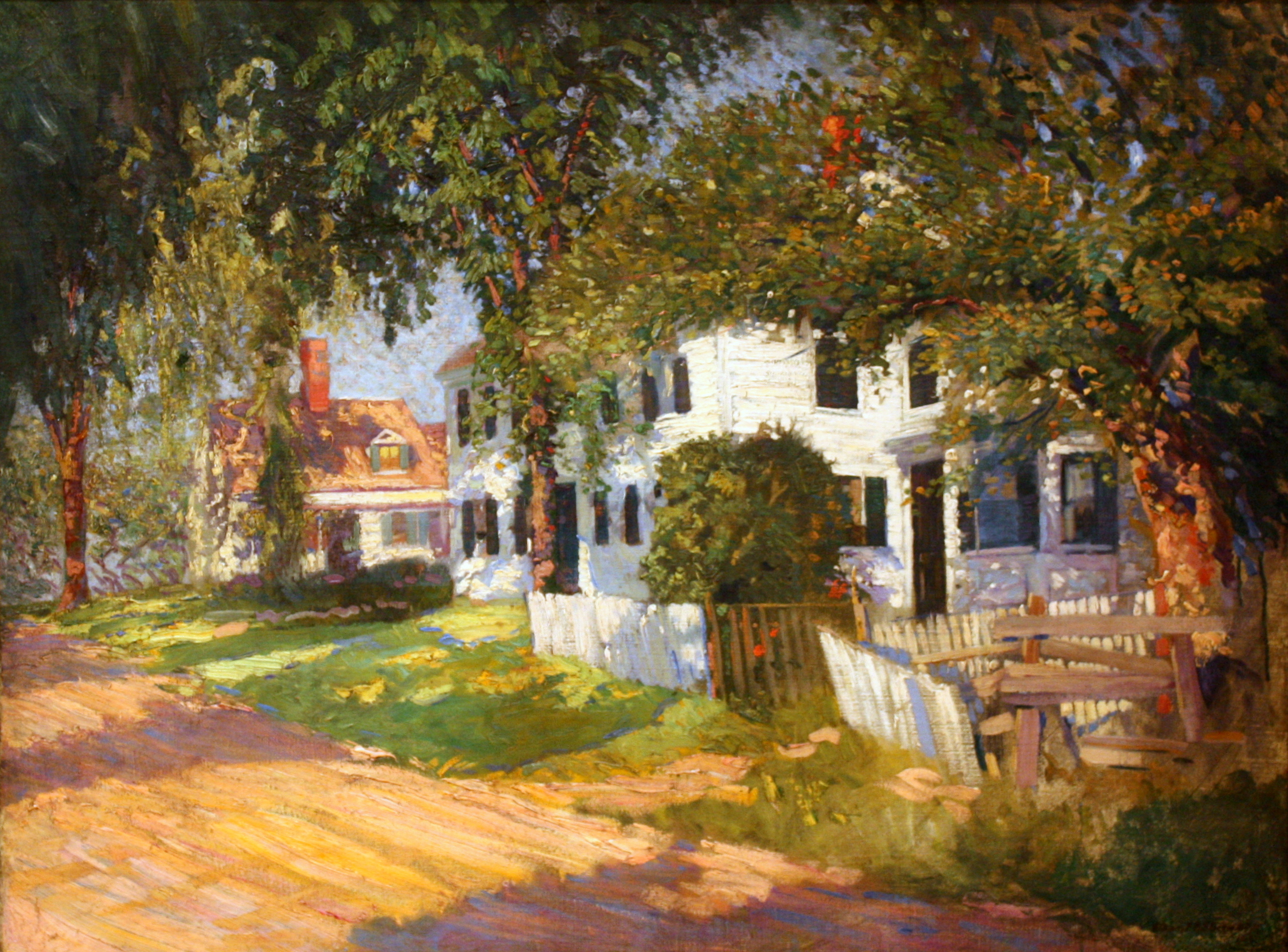
Late Afternoon Light, 1915, by William Starkweather, from the permanent collection of the Hickory Museum of Art.

Upon return to New York in 1901, Starkweather supported himself by illustrating books and teaching at a private boys’ school. During this time, he was also saving for a trip to Spain. Starkweather illustrated books for four New York publishing houses: F.M. Buckles and Company, Grosset and Dunlap, The Macmillan Company, and, most prolifically, R.F. Feno and Company. Two years later, he arrived in Seville, Spain, contacted Sorolla, and asked to be taken on as a student. Starkweather spent three years with the Spanish master before embarking on a three-year independent study in Italy, then returning to New York as a practicing artist. In 1909, Sorolla came to New York to attend the opening of an exhibition of his work, organized by the Hispanic Society of America. Starkweather lectured and published extensively on Spanish art and his teacher’s work, and became an assistant curator at the Hispanic Society. Continuing to paint throughout his time with the Hispanic Society, Starkweather was able to mount his first solo exhibition in 1914 at the Folsom Galleries in New York. In 1918, he began a 28-year teaching career in the art schools of New York. By 1921, Starkweather had switched from oil painting to watercolor, a transition that garnered critical acclaim and afforded him three solo exhibitions in New York’s Fifteen Gallery. He also became a member of the American Water Color Society. As Starkweather grew older, he expressed concern over the disposal of his work after his death. Thus, in 1954, he donated eight of his paintings to the Hickory Museum of Art. Starkweather’s work ranges from interior scenes to landscapes and portraiture, and often revolves around the symbolic identity of an artist.
