= Joseph A. Foran High School =

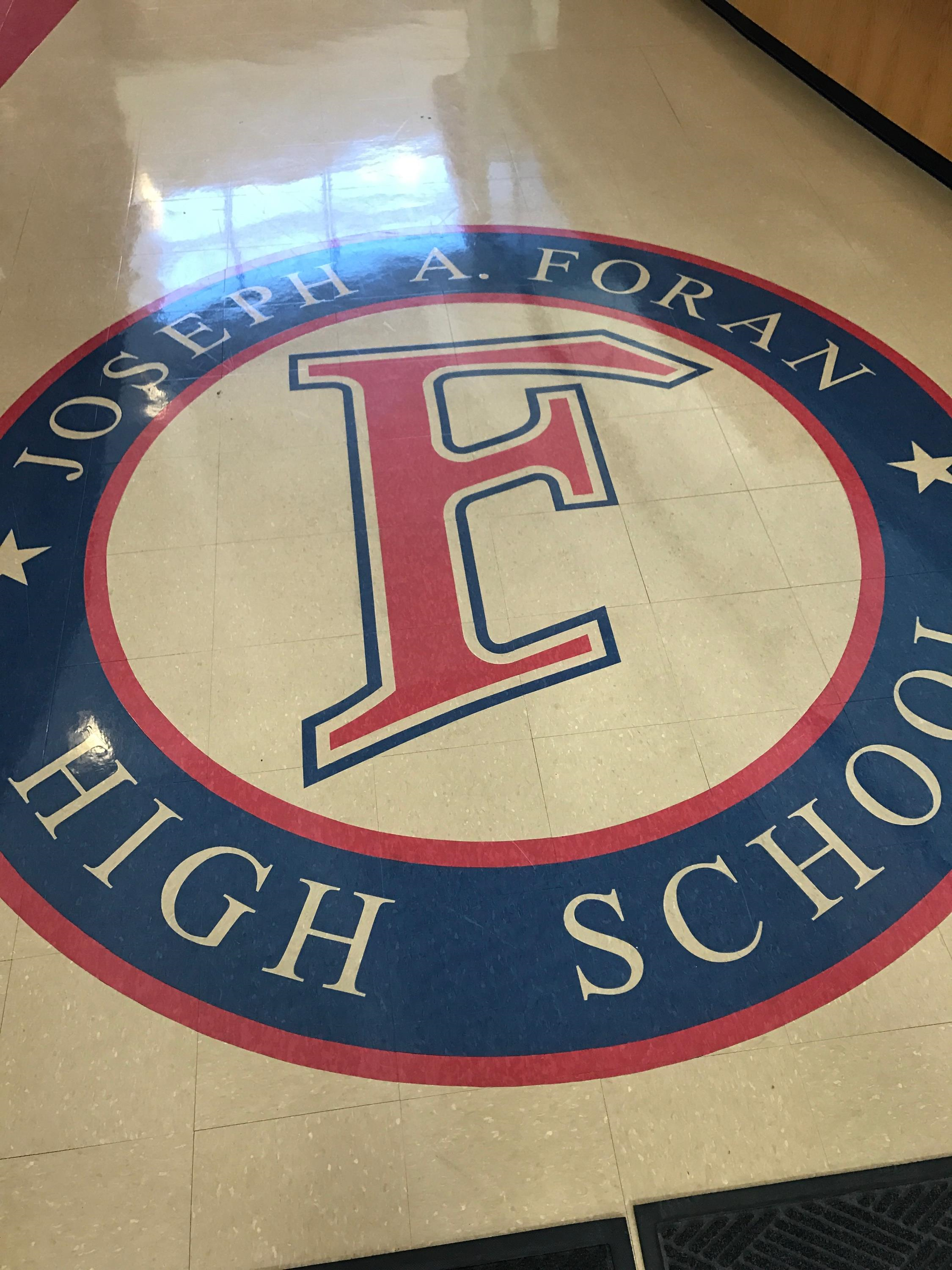

Location
- 80 Foran Road; Milford, Connecticut 06460; United States; 41°13′08″N 73°00′45″W

Information
- Type: Public
- Motto: Lion Pride
- Established: 1973 (53 years ago)
- School district: Milford Public Schools
- CEEB code: 070424
- Principal: Max Berkowitz
- Teaching staff: 65.70 (on an FTE basis)
- Grades: 9–12
- Enrollment: 729 (2023–2024)
- Student to teacher ratio: 11.10
- Colors: Blue, red, white
- Athletics conference: CAS/CIAC Southern Connecticut Conference
- Team name: Lions
- Newspaper: Mane Street Mirror
- Website: www.milforded.org/o/fhs

Joseph A. Foran High School is a public high school located in Milford, Connecticut. The school serves about 1,000 students in grades 9–12 in the Milford Public Schools system.

== History ==
Opened in 1973, the school was named for former Superintendent of Schools Joseph A. Foran. It opened as the third of three high schools in Milford, including Milford High School and Jonathan Law High School. About ten years after the opening of Foran High School, Milford High School closed in 1983.

In 2020, the high school renamed its softball diamond in honor of the softball player, two-time state honoree, and alumni, Danni Kemp.

In 2022, the high school renamed its tennis courts in honor of its first principal, Richard Herman, after his death.

== Sports ==
Fall sports include boys' and girls' cross country, football, boys' and girls' soccer, girls' swimming, and girls' volleyball.

Winter sports include boys' and girls' basketball, girls' gymnastics, boys' and girls' ice hockey, boys' swimming, boys' and girls' indoor track, and wrestling.

Spring sports include baseball, boys' and girls' golf, boys' and girls' lacrosse, boys' and girls' outdoor track, softball, girls' tennis, and boys' volleyball.

=== List of Championship Wins ===
CIAC State Championships
| Sport | Class | Year(s) |
|---|---|---|
| Baseball | L | 2017 |
| Football | M | 1994 |
| Soccer (girls) | M | 2025 |
| Softball | L, M | 2002, 2011, 2025, 2026 |
| Swimming (boys) | M | 1983, 1984 |
| Volleyball (girls) | M | 1975 |
| Wrestling | M | 2016, 2018, 2025, 2026 |
