= Huntington Center Historic District =

Historic district in Connecticut, United States

- U.S. National Register of Historic Places
- U.S. Historic district
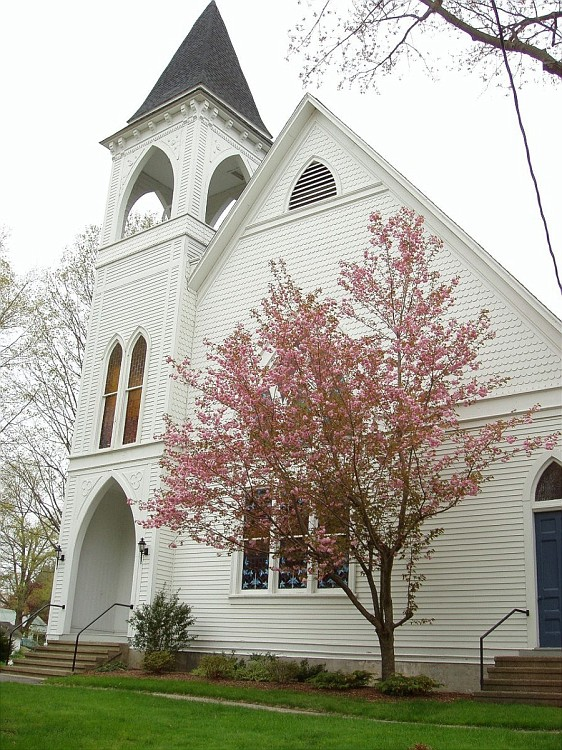
- Huntington Congregational Church

- Location within Connecticut Location within the United States
- Location: Roughly along Church and Huntington Streets, from Ripton Road to the Farmill River, Shelton, Connecticut
- Coordinates: 41°17′29″N 73°8′39″W
- Area: 60 acres (24 ha)
- Architectural style: Colonial, Federal
- NRHP reference No.: 00000296
- Added to NRHP: March 31, 2000

The Huntington Center Historic District is a historic district in the city of Shelton, Connecticut. The district encompasses the original colonial settlement of Shelton, which was first known as Huntington. It is a linear district about 0.75 miles (1.21 km) in length, centered on the Huntington Green and Cemetery, and extending north along Church Street and south along Huntington Street. The district is predominantly residential, although it has two churches. The green was laid out in 1717, and many of the district's historic buildings were built over the next 150 years. The district's oldest building is a house with an estimated construction date of 1710. The district was listed on the National Register of Historic Places in 2000.

The area that is now Shelton was settled by English colonists in the 17th century as part of Stratford. In 1717 a Congregationalist parish was established, and in 1789 the town of Huntington was incorporated, including what is now neighboring Monroe. The site of the early parish became the center of the new town. In addition to its civic function, the area also developed some industry, powered by the waters of the Farmill River and Means Brook. In the second half of the 19th century, the community's industrial and civic focus shifted to the Housatonic River (its eastern border), and it was renamed Shelton in 1919 in honor of Edward Shelton, one of its major industrialists. Shelton's likely ancestral home still stands in Huntington Center.

== Significant properties ==
- Huntington Green, 1717
- Josiah Wheeler House
- Rev. Jedediah Mills House, 1734
- DeForest-Rudd House, c. 1770, Colonial
- Huntington Congregational Church, c. 1890, Gothic Revival
- St. Paul's Episcopal Church, 1812, Federal

== See also ==
- National Register of Historic Places listings in Fairfield County, Connecticut
