= Thomas J. Gibson =

African American academic administrator

- Born: New Haven, Connecticut, U.S.
- Occupations: Academic administrator and professor
- Title: Chancellor

Academic background
- Education: Eastern Connecticut State University, B.S. University of New Haven, M.S. Johnson & Wales University, Ed.D.

Academic work
- Discipline: Education
- Sub-discipline: Educational leadership in higher education
- Institutions: University of Connecticut York College, City University of New York; Ball State University; Bowling Green State University; University of Wisconsin–Stevens Point University of Wisconsin–Milwaukee

Thomas J. Gibson is an African American academic administrator and academic. He is currently the chancellor of the University of Wisconsin–Milwaukee. He was previously the chancellor of the University of Wisconsin–Stevens Point,

== Early life ==
Gibson is from New Haven, Connecticut. He graduated from Career Magnet High School in New Haven.

He attended Eastern Connecticut State University and graduated with a Bachelor of Science in mass communication. He was a first-generation college graduate who paid for college with a scholarship and by working. He then attended University of New Haven, where he earned an Master of Science in education. He then completed an Ed.D. in educational leadership in higher education at Johnson & Wales University.

== Career ==
Gibson taught English at Mitchell College from 1997 to 1988. He taught interdisciplinary studies from 2001 from 2005 at the University of Connecticut. He was at York College, City University of New York from 2009 to 2013, as the assistant dean and department chair of student development and the associate dean of student development. He also taught at Ball State University between 2014 and 2015.

From 2016 to 2020, Gibson was the vice president for student affairs and vice provost at Bowling Green State University. He also taught at Bowling Green.

Gibson became the fifteenth chancellor of University of Wisconsin–Stevens Point on January 11, 2021. He was also a tenured professor of education at Stephens Point from 2001 to 2025. He became the tenth chancellor of the University of Wisconsin–Milwaukee on July 1, 2025.

== Personal life ==
Gibson and his wife, Bridgette, have one daughter. He is a member of Phi Beta Sigma.
