= Las Matas de Farfán =

- Las Matas de Farfán in the Dominican Republic
- Coordinates: 18°52′12″N 71°31′12″W
- Country: Dominican Republic
- Province: San Juan

Area
  - Total: 636.64 km^{2} (245.81 sq mi)

Population (2012)
  - Total: 70,586
  - Density: 110.87/km^{2} (287.16/sq mi)
- Municipal Districts: 2

Las Matas de Farfán is a town in the San Juan Province, Dominican Republic. It is the birthplace of a number of current and former Major League Baseball players including Jean Segura, Juan Encarnación, Roberto Novoa, Odalis Perez, Ramón Santiago, and Valerio de los Santos. During the 1822–44 Haitian occupation, the town was officially designated as Las-Mathas.

The Furnia de Catanamatias, in the mountain range above the town, is the deepest cave in the Dominican republic (380m).

== Climate ==
Las Matas de Farfán has a tropical savanna climate (Köppen Aw) with very hot daytime temperatures and milder nighttime temperatures year round. Diurnal temperature variation is very large for the Caribbean.

Climate data for Las Matas de Farfán (1961–1990)
Month	Jan	Feb	Mar	Apr	May	Jun	Jul	Aug	Sep	Oct	Nov	Dec	Year
Record high °C (°F)	37.8 (100.0)	38.8 (101.8)	38.0 (100.4)	39.0 (102.2)	38.5 (101.3)	38.5 (101.3)	38.7 (101.7)	38.5 (101.3)	38.2 (100.8)	38.2 (100.8)	38.0 (100.4)	38.3 (100.9)	39.0 (102.2)
Mean daily maximum °C (°F)	31.1 (88.0)	31.9 (89.4)	33.0 (91.4)	33.6 (92.5)	33.5 (92.3)	34.2 (93.6)	34.5 (94.1)	34.4 (93.9)	33.5 (92.3)	32.4 (90.3)	31.3 (88.3)	30.4 (86.7)	32.8 (91.0)
Mean daily minimum °C (°F)	15.7 (60.3)	16.2 (61.2)	17.3 (63.1)	18.3 (64.9)	19.2 (66.6)	19.6 (67.3)	19.2 (66.6)	19.3 (66.7)	19.2 (66.6)	19.0 (66.2)	17.7 (63.9)	15.9 (60.6)	18.0 (64.4)
Record low °C (°F)	9.3 (48.7)	10.3 (50.5)	10.5 (50.9)	12.0 (53.6)	14.0 (57.2)	13.0 (55.4)	15.0 (59.0)	15.5 (59.9)	15.2 (59.4)	11.0 (51.8)	11.8 (53.2)	9.5 (49.1)	9.3 (48.7)
Average rainfall mm (inches)	9.1 (0.36)	10.0 (0.39)	35.0 (1.38)	104.3 (4.11)	164.5 (6.48)	109.7 (4.32)	82.8 (3.26)	125.2 (4.93)	150.1 (5.91)	154.1 (6.07)	53.6 (2.11)	13.3 (0.52)	1,011.7 (39.83)
Average rainy days (≥ 1.0 mm)	1.1	1.5	3.0	7.3	11.1	7.1	6.5	8.7	10.2	10.7	4.4	2.0	73.6
Source: NOAA
