= Furnia de Catanamatias =

- El Respiradero del Diablo
- Location within the Dominican Republic
- Location: Las Matas de Farfán, Dominican Republic
- Coordinates: 19°03′01″N 71°25′02″W
- Depth: 380 metres (1,250 ft)
- Discovery: 1988
- Geology: Limestone

The Furnia de Catanamatias, also known as El Respiradero del Diablo, is the deepest cave in Dominican Republic, located near Las Matas de Farfán, San Juan, in the Sierra de Neiba mountain range. The cave was discovered in 1988 by a group of Italian cavers who wrote that they explored it to a depth of 380 meters. A later expedition in 2023 by cavers from USA, Mexico and Costa Rica explored the cave down to 195m and stopped due to unbreathable air with high CO_{2} level. The cave floods significantly during the wet season, and as a result the passages are often muddy, featureless, filled with mud and decomposing organic matter, which causes dangers such as unbreathable air and leptospirosis. Future expeditions to Catanamatias will need failproof respirator technology to continue exploration into regions of the cave with unbreathable air.

The cave entrance is remarkably large, and gives access to a gallery with an inclination of 47°. The section of this gallery is 30m wide and 20m high. In this gallery, a noise similar to a deep and rhythmic breathing can be heard, which accounts for the name of the cave.

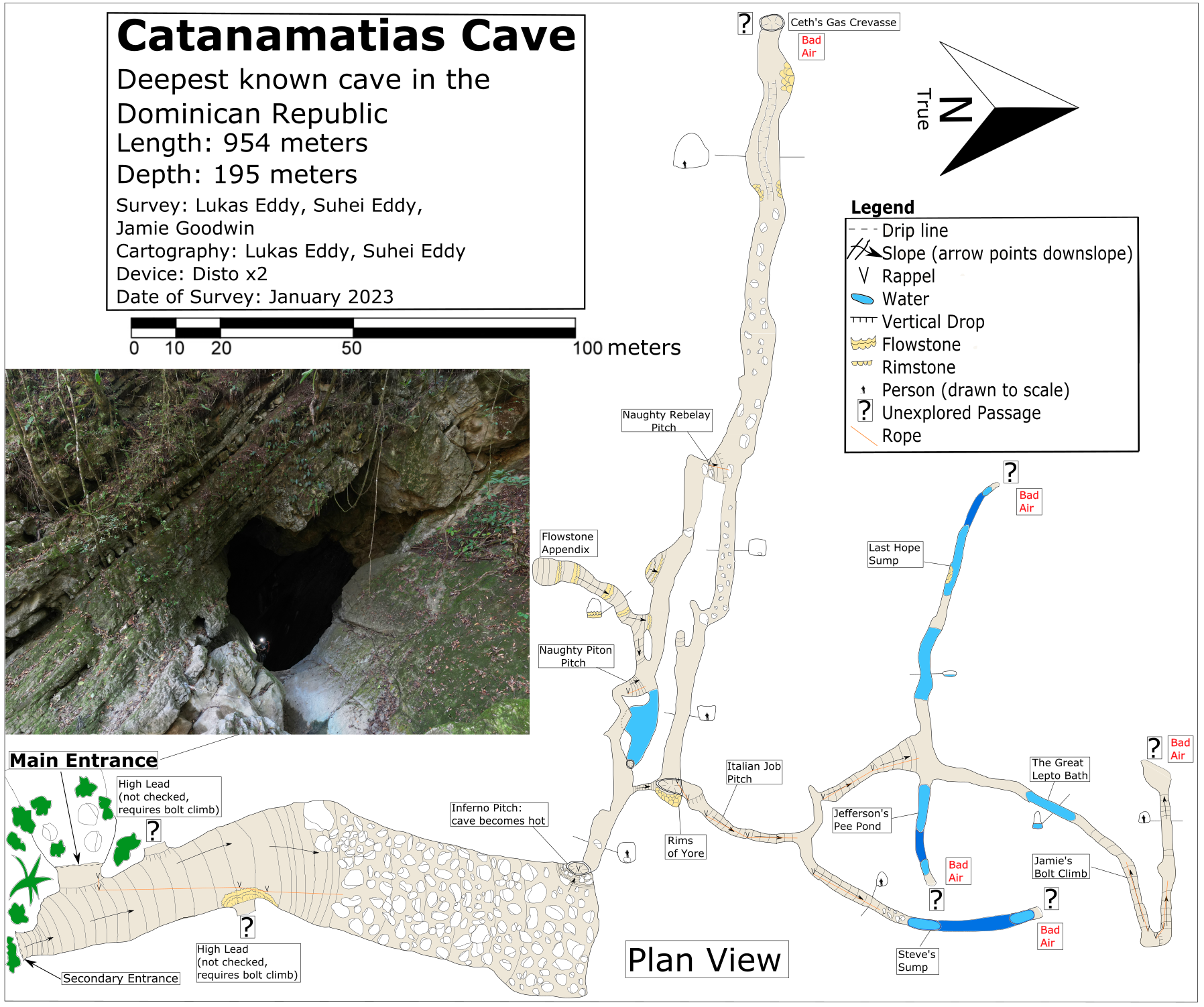
Plan map of Catanamatias Cave by Lukas Eddy

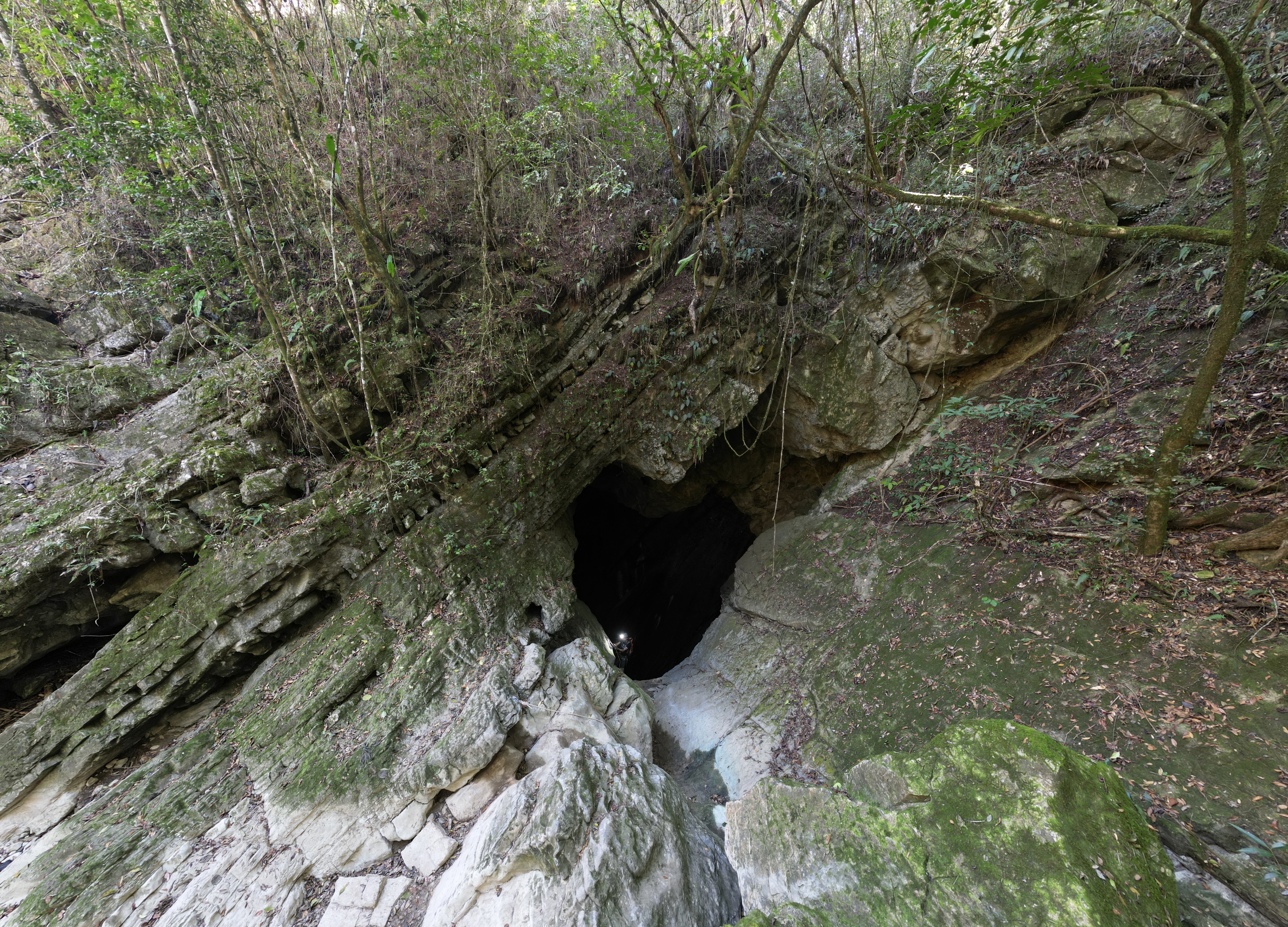
The entrance to Catanamatias Cave

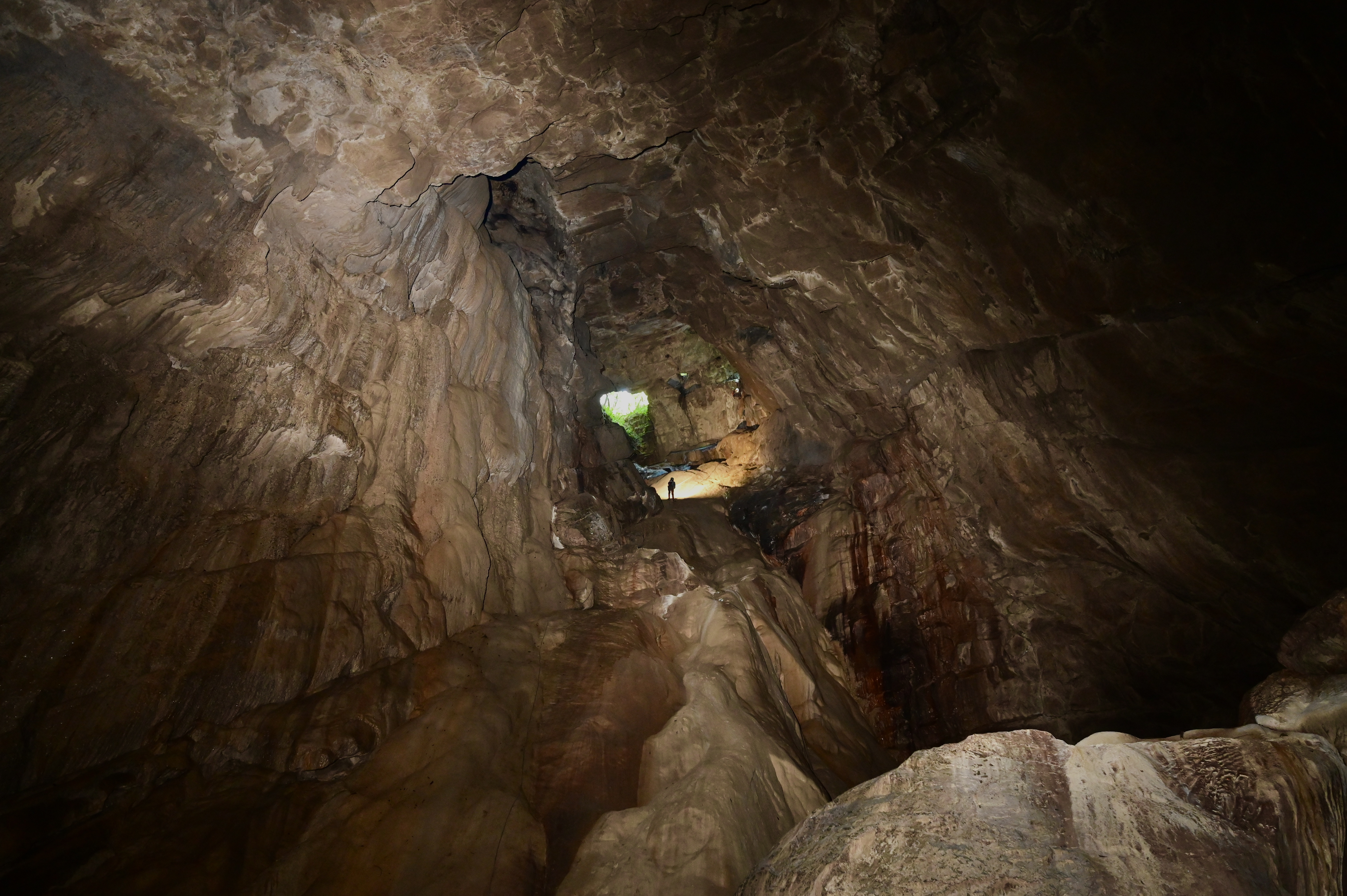
The interior of Catanamatias Cave

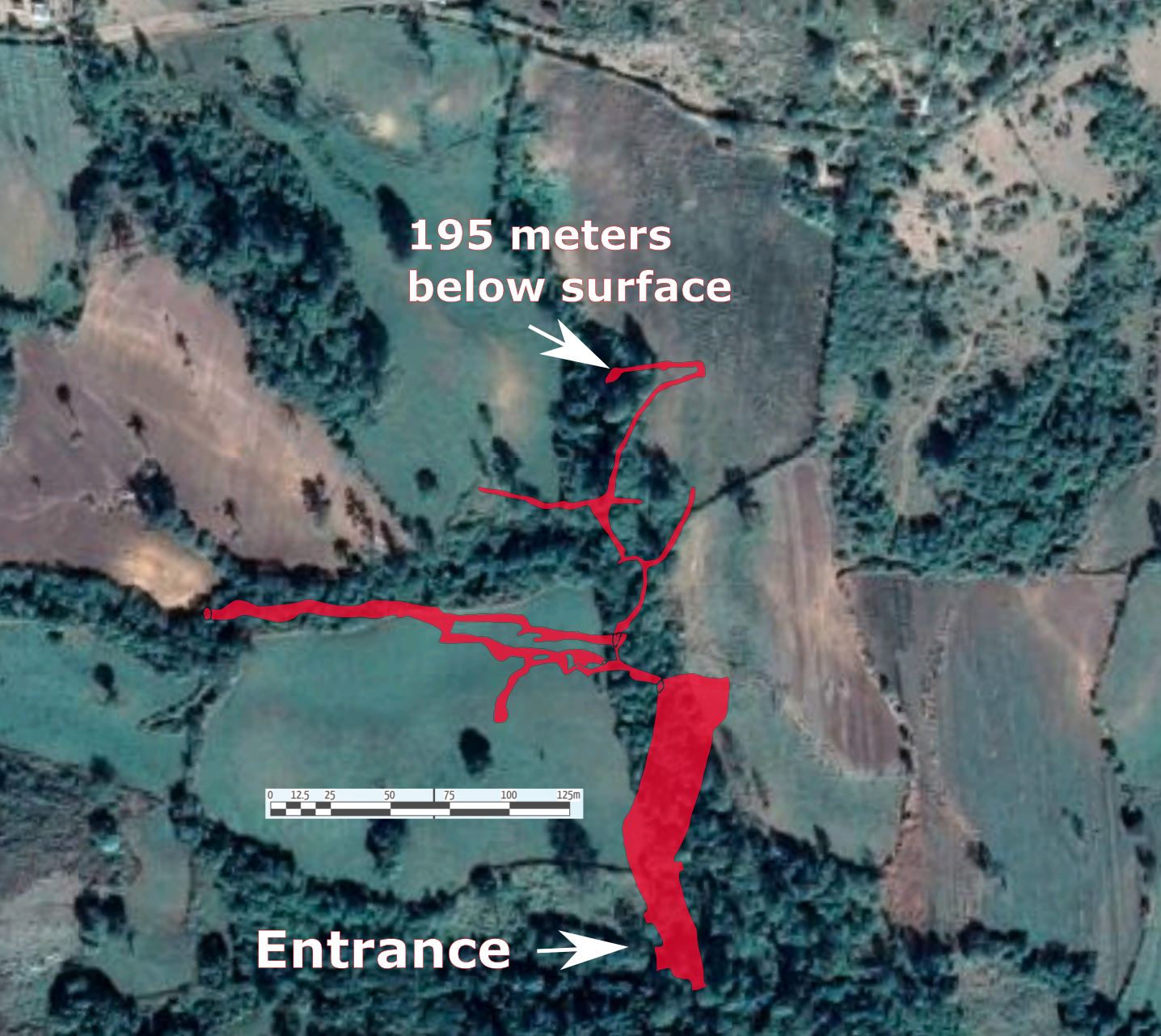
Satellite Overlay of Catanamatias Cave, produced by Lukas Eddy

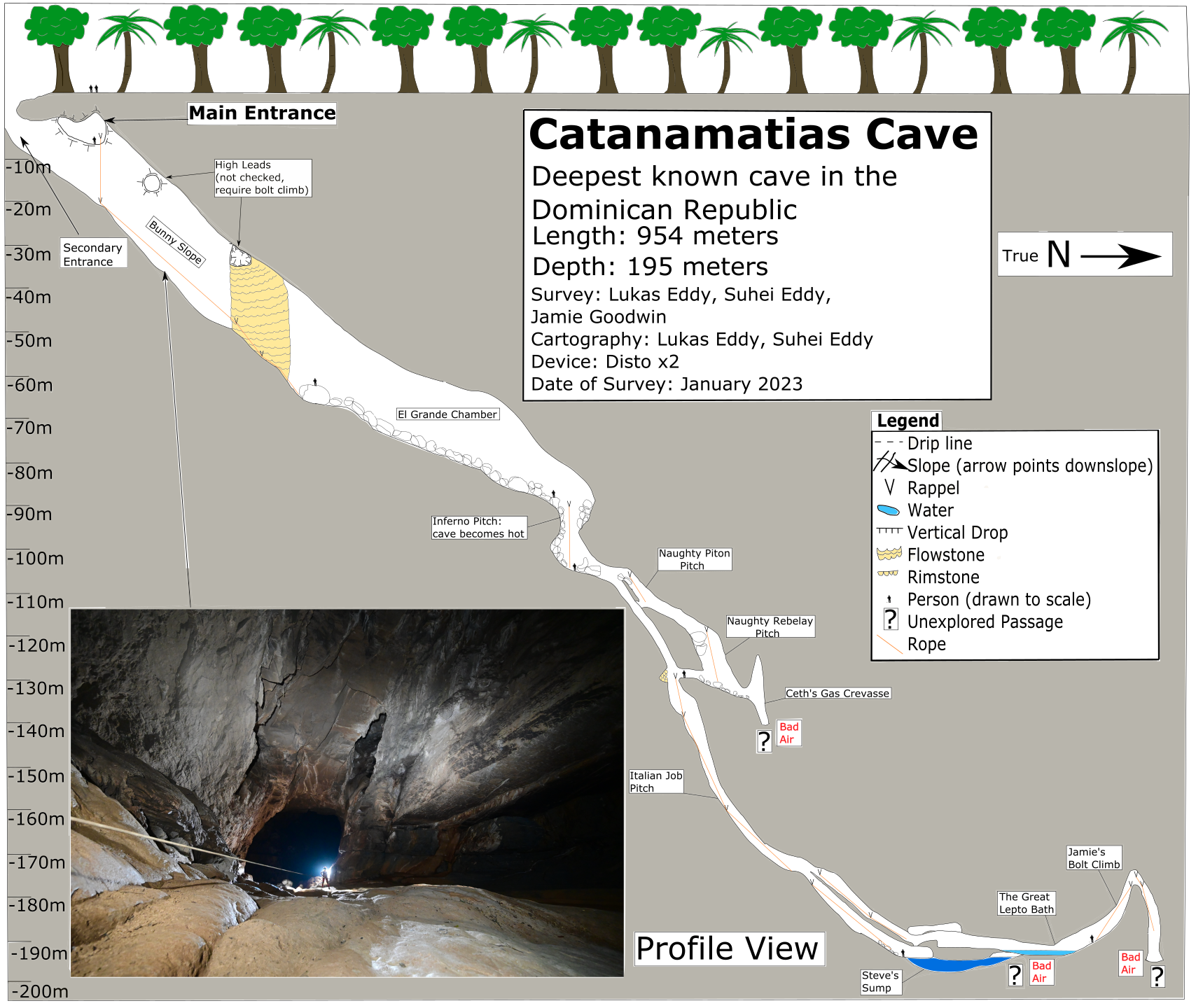
Profile map of Catanamatias Cave by Lukas Eddy
