= Commodore Hull School =

- U.S. National Register of Historic Places
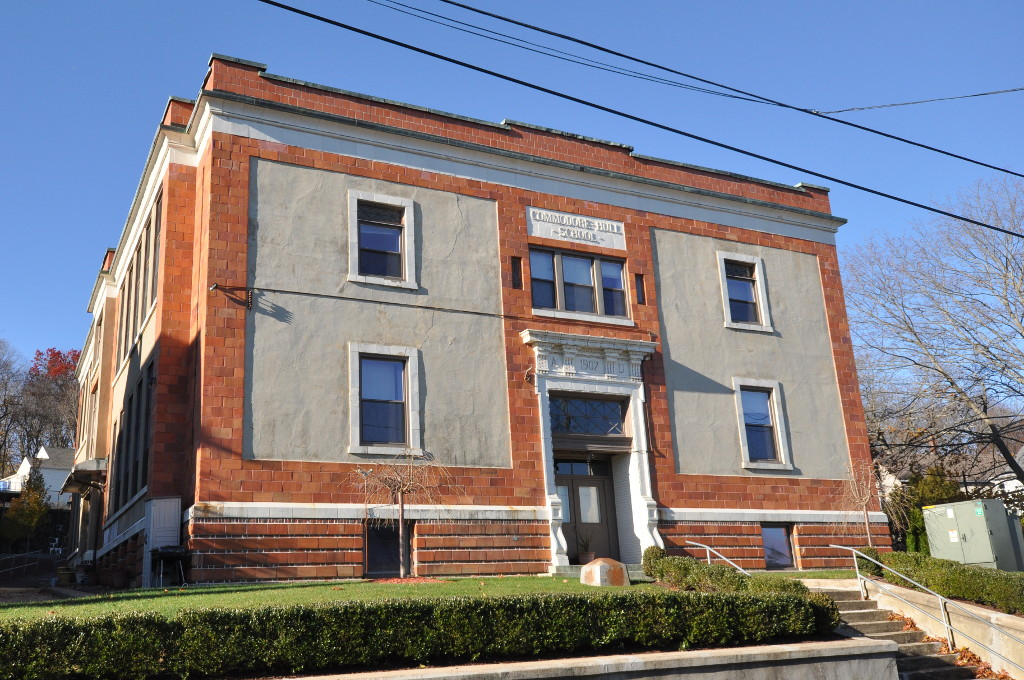

- Location within Connecticut Location within the United States
- Location: 130 Oak Avenue Shelton, Connecticut
- Coordinates: 41°19′5″N 73°6′3″W
- Area: 0.6 acres (0.24 ha)
- Built: 1907
- Architect: Meloy, Arthur S.; Beckwith, Frederick S.
- Architectural style: Classical Revival, Neo-Classical Influence
- NRHP reference No.: 83001251
- Added to NRHP: June 30, 1983

The Commodore Hull School, now also known as the Commodore Hull School Apartments, is a former elementary school at 130 Oak Avenue in Shelton, Connecticut. It was built in 1907, and is believed to be the first school in the state built using the fireproof combination of terra cotta blocks and reinforced concrete. The building was listed on the National Register of Historic Places in 1983.

== Description and history ==
The former Commodore Hull School is located in a residential area northwest of downtown Shelton, on the west side of Oak Street. It is a two-story structure, constructed of terra cotta blocks, brick, and reinforced concrete, with a flat roof. The street-facing facade has a center entrance flanked by large panels of stuccoed concrete, in which sash windows are set on both levels. The side facades each have secondary entrances in projecting center sections, with flanking bands of windows. The building is crowned by a low parapet.

The school was built in 1907, when Shelton was still part of Huntington, but growing rapidly as an urban industrial community. It is significant as an early example of the movement towards completely fireproof school building, in general stirred by the 1871 great fire of Chicago. It was designed by Meloy and Beckwith, and included what were considered the latest advances in fireproof construction. The school was named for Commodore Isaac Hull, a Huntington native who commanded USS Constitution during the War of 1812. It served as a school until 1978.

== See also ==
- National Register of Historic Places listings in Fairfield County, Connecticut
