= Worthington Hooker =

American physician

Worthington Hooker (March 3, 1806 – November 6, 1867) was an American medical doctor, born in Springfield, Massachusetts. Worthington Hooker School in New Haven, Connecticut is named after him.

He graduated Yale University in 1825 and Harvard University with a degree in medicine in 1829. He practiced in Connecticut until 1852. Afterwards, he was professor of the theory and practice of medicine at Yale. He was vice president of the American Medical Association in 1864. His principal works are:

- Physician and Patient (1849)
- Homeopathy: An Examination of the Doctrines and Evidences (1852)
- Human physiology (1854)
- Rational Therapeutics (1857)
- Child's Book of Nature 3 volumes (1857)
- Science for the School and Family 3 parts (1863)

Hooker's book Physician and Patient has been described as the most original United States contribution to medical ethics in the 19th century.
