= Jonathan Law High School =

Location
- 20 Lansdale Avenue; Milford, Connecticut 06460; United States; 41°12′16″N 73°05′16″W

Information
- Type: Public
- Established: 1961 (65 years ago)
- School district: Milford Public Schools
- CEEB code: 070423
- Principal: Bryan Darcy
- Faculty: 72.90 (on FTE basis)
- Grades: 9–12
- Enrollment: 829 (2023-2024)
- Student to teacher ratio: 11.37
- Colors: Black and gold
- Athletics conference: CAS/CIAC Southern Connecticut Conference
- Mascot: Eagle
- Publication: The Guardian
- Newspaper: The Advocate
- Yearbook: The Rostrum
- Website: www.milforded.org/o/jlhs

Jonathan Law High School is a public high school located in Milford, Connecticut, United States. It serves about 1,000 students in grades 9–12 in the Milford Public Schools system.

== History ==
The school was built in the 1960s to accommodate the increased student numbers caused by the baby-boom after World War II. It was named in honor of the 27th Governor of the Colony of Connecticut, Jonathan Law (August 6, 1674 – November 6, 1750). Until the 1970s, the Milford Public School System continued to include two public high schools, Milford High School in the central part of the city and Jonathan Law High School on the west end of the city, but shortly after the opening of a third, Joseph A. Foran High School on the east end of the city, Milford High School was closed and converted to accommodate municipal administrative offices due to the city's diminishing student numbers. The school mascot is a humanoid eagle, but male sports teams refer to themselves as the Lawmen.

== Sports ==
Sports offered are:

- Softball
- Baseball
- Cheerleading
- Tennis (male and female)
- Cross country (male and female)
- Football
- Volleyball
- Basketball (male and female)
- Swimming (male and female)
- Soccer (male and female)
- Wrestling (male and female)
- Ice Hockey (male and female)
  - Male team co-operates with Joseph A. Foran High School and Platt Technical High School, known as the Milford Mariners
  - Female team co-operates with Joseph A. Foran High School and Notre Dame in Fairfield
- Outdoor track (male and female)
- Indoor track (male and female)
- Lacrosse (male and female)
- Gymnastics
- Golf

Sports teams participate in the CIAC and Southern Connecticut Conference.

== Notable alumni ==
- Doug Coby, racing driver
