= Valerio de los Santos =

Dominican baseball player (born 1972)

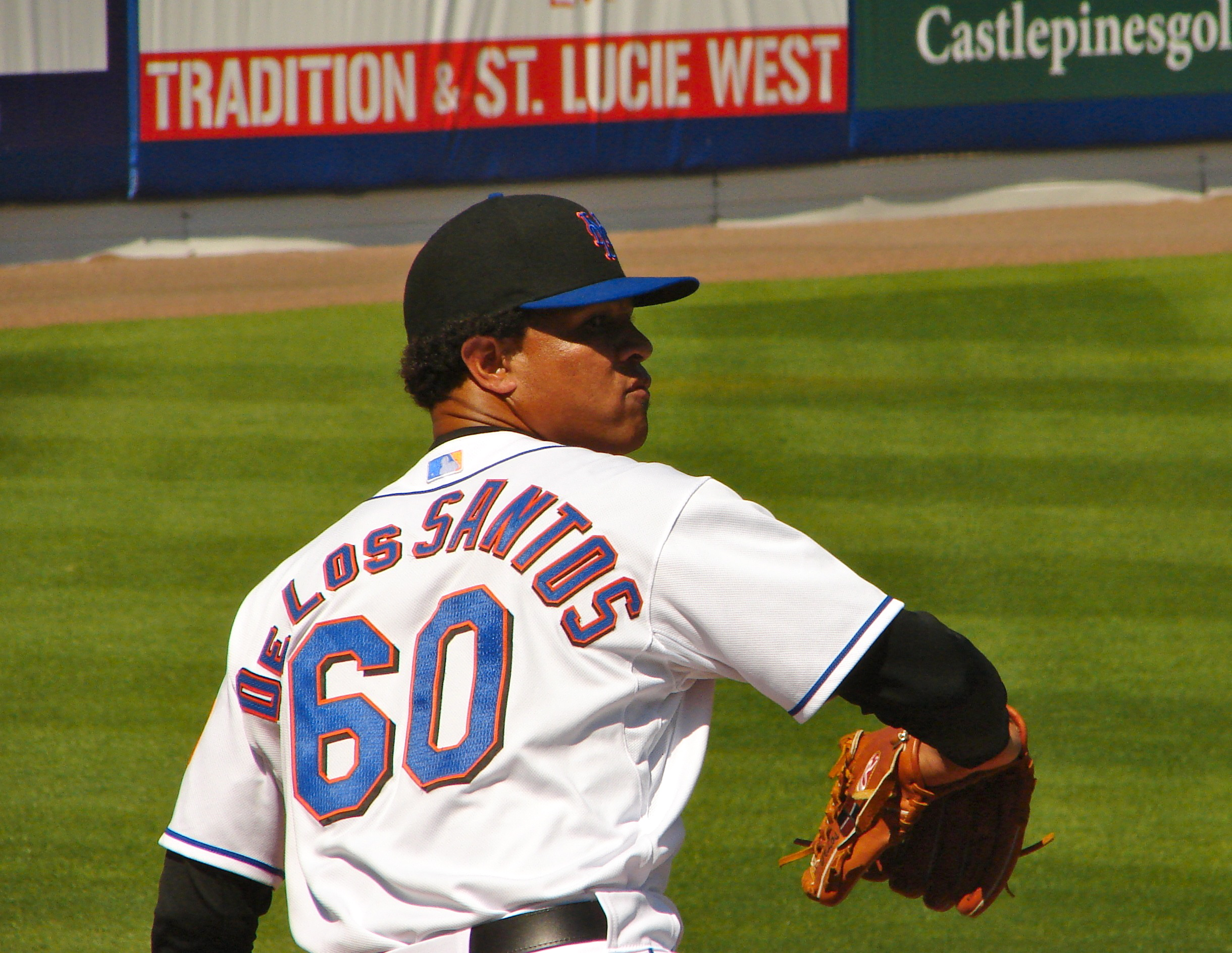
- De los Santos with the New York Mets in 2009
- Pitcher
- Born: October 6, 1972 (age 53); Las Matas de Farfan, Dominican Republic
- Batted: Left Threw: Left

Professional debut
- MLB: July 31, 1998, for the Milwaukee Brewers
- CPBL: April 21, 2009, for the Uni-President 7-Eleven Lions

Last appearance
- MLB: August 2, 2008, for the Colorado Rockies
- CPBL: May 13, 2009, for the Uni-President 7-Eleven Lions

MLB statistics
- Win–loss record: 9–13
- Earned run average: 4.57
- Strikeouts: 207

CPBL statistics
- Win–loss record: 0–2
- Earned run average: 5.87
- Strikeouts: 10
- Stats at Baseball Reference

Teams
- Milwaukee Brewers (1998–2003); Philadelphia Phillies (2003); Toronto Blue Jays (2004); Florida Marlins (2005); Colorado Rockies (2008); Uni-President 7-Eleven Lions (2009)

Career highlights and awards
- Taiwan Series champion (2009)

Valerio Lorenzo de los Santos (born October 6, 1972) is a Dominican former professional baseball pitcher. He played in Major League Baseball (MLB) for the Milwaukee Brewers, Philadelphia Phillies, Toronto Blue Jays, Florida Marlins, and Colorado Rockies. He also played in the Chinese Professional Baseball League (CPBL) for the Uni-President 7-Eleven Lions.

== Career ==
=== Milwaukee Brewers ===
De los Santos was originally signed by the Milwaukee Brewers as an amateur free agent in 1993. He started his professional career in the minor leagues in 1995, and spent the next four seasons in the Brewers' farm system, playing for the AZL Brewers, Beloit Snappers, El Paso Diablos, and Louisville Redbirds. He was promoted to the major leagues in 1998, and made his debut for the Brewers on July 31. He would play in 74 games for the Brewers from 1999 to 2001, and played in 51 games for the team in 2002. He began the 2003 season with the Brewers, and pitched 45 games for the club that year.

=== Philadelphia Phillies ===
On September 2, 2003, the Brewers traded De los Santos to the Philadelphia Phillies in exchange for cash considerations. De los Santos pitched to a 9.00 ERA over six appearances for the Phillies in 2003 and elected free agency on December 21.

=== Toronto Blue Jays ===
On December 27, 2003, De los Santos signed with the Toronto Blue Jays. In 2004, he pitched to a 6.17 ERA over 17 games for the Blue Jays. He elected free agency on October 28, 2004.

=== Florida Marlins ===
On April 13, 2005, De los Santos signed with the Florida Marlins. On July 9, pitching in the ninth inning against the Chicago Cubs, de los Santos hit Adam Greenberg directly in the back of his head with a 92 mph fastball on the very first pitch of the plate appearance. "The first thing going through your mind is, 'This guy's dead,'" de los Santos said. Greenberg suffered a traumatic brain injury and major skull fracture as a result of the beaning, and still has positional vertigo. In 2005, he pitched to a 6.14 ERA over 27 games for the Marlins. He was released by the Marlins on August 13.

=== Chicago White Sox ===
On January 27, 2006. De los Santos signed a minor league contract with the Washington Nationals. He was released by the Nationals organization before the season started on March 23.

On June 13, 2006, De los Santos signed a minor league contract with the Chicago White Sox organization. He played for the Triple-A Charlotte Knights for the remainder of the season, carrying a 3.02 ERA over 19 games. De los Santos elected free agency on October 15.

=== Sultanes de Monterrey ===
In 2007, De los Santos signed with the Sultanes de Monterrey of the Mexican League. He pitched in 16 games and had a 4.40 ERA when he was released by the Sultanes.

=== Dorados de Chihuahua ===
Shortly after his release, De los Santos signed with the Dorados de Chihuahua of the Mexican League. He pitched in three games for the Dorados and finished the season with the club. De los Santos elected free agency at season's end.

=== Colorado Rockies ===
On February 17, 2008, De los Santos signed a minor league contract with the Colorado Rockies. In 2008, he began the year with the Triple-A Colorado Springs Sky Sox. De los Santos was promoted to the major leagues on July 28, 2008. He pitched in two major league games before being designated for assignment by the Rockies on August 4. De los Santos elected free agency on October 8.

=== Uni-President 7-Eleven Lions ===
On January 29, 2009, he signed a minor league contract with the New York Mets. He was released on March 25 after being cut from team during spring training.

Shortly after his release from the Mets, De los Santos signed with the Uni-President 7-Eleven Lions of the Chinese Professional Baseball League. He played in four games for the Lions, carrying a 5.87 ERA over 15 1/3 innings pitched. He won the Taiwan Series with the Lions in 2009 and became a free agent after the season.

=== Long Island Ducks ===
On March 10, 2011, De los Santos signed a contract with the Long Island Ducks of the Atlantic League of Professional Baseball. After carrying a 5.23 ERA over 21 games, De los Santos was released on May 10.

=== Vaqueros Laguna ===
On May 26, 2011, De los Santos signed with the Vaqueros Laguna of the Mexican League. He pitched in 28 games, with a 5.81 ERA over 26 1/3 innings. De los Santos became a free agent after the season.
