= Mark T. Sheehan High School =

Location
- 142 Hope Hill Road; Wallingford, New Haven County, Connecticut 06492; United States; 41°29′08″N 72°50′09″W

Information
- School type: Public High School
- Established: 1971 (55 years ago)
- Sister school: Lyman Hall High School
- School district: Wallingford Public Schools
- Category: High school
- CEEB code: 070813
- Principal: Enzo Zocco
- Teaching staff: 63.10 (on an FTE basis)
- Grades: 9–12
- Enrollment: 724 (2023–2024)
- Student to teacher ratio: 11.47
- Colors: Maroon and gold
- Athletics: Football, basketball, baseball, softball, volleyball, ice hockey, field hockey lacrosse, track and field, cross country, soccer, tennis
- Athletics conference: Southern Connecticut Conference
- Mascot: Titans
- Website: mtshs.wallingford.k12.ct.us

Mark T. Sheehan High School is a public high school located at 142 Hope Hill Road, Wallingford, Connecticut. It is part of the Wallingford Public School System, and one of two public high schools in Wallingford, Lyman Hall High School being the other. Its official colors are burgundy and gold.

== History ==
The school is named after Mark T. Sheehan, a medical officer during World War I; he had also practiced medicine in Wallingford and was known to never deny service to anyone including patients who could not afford care.
