= Lou DeFilippo =

American football player (1916–2000)

- DeFilippo in 1947

No. 55, 10
- Positions: Tackle, Center

Personal information
- Born: August 28, 1916; East Haven, Connecticut, U.S.
- Died: March 5, 2000 (aged 83); Miami, Florida, U.S.
- Listed height: 6 ft 2 in (1.88 m)
- Listed weight: 230 lb (104 kg)

Career information
- High school: Hillhouse (New Haven, Connecticut)
- College: Fordham (1937-1940)
- NFL draft: 1941: 6th round, 47th overall pick

Career history

Playing
- New York Giants (1941, 1945–1947)

Coaching
- Baltimore Colts (1948) Assistant coach

Career NFL statistics
- Games played: 36
- Starts: 5
- Fumble recoveries: 1
- Stats at Pro Football Reference

Lou Phillip DeFilippo (August 28, 1916 – March 5, 2000) was an American professional football tackle and center. He played college football for the Fordham Rams and was selected by the New York Giants in the sixth round of the 1941 NFL draft and played for the Giants in 1941 and from 1945 to 1947.

== Biography ==
=== Early life ===
Lou DeFilippo was born August 28, 1916, in East Haven, Connecticut. He attended New Haven High School in New Haven where he was a star lineman on the school's football team, starting as a tackle on the Connecticut state champion 1932 Hillhouse team.

=== College career ===
DeFilippo went on to play collegiately for Fordham University, where he was the captain of the school's 1941 Cotton Bowl team.

=== Professional career ===
He was selected in the 6th round of the 1941 NFL draft by the New York Giants, who made him the 47th overall pick of the draft. He would see action in 11 games for the Giants during the 1941 season.

Defilippo's professional career would be interrupted during his prime with the coming of World War II. He would not return to the Giants to resume his career until 1945, when he saw action in 10 games — including five appearances in the starting lineup — at the right tackle position. He would see action in 11 games as a reserve during the 1946 season but his career would come to an abrupt end the following year, with the 31-year old lineman managing to play in just four games.

=== Coaching career ===
After his retirement from professional football, DeFilippo went into coaching, spending several years as an assistant at his alma mater, Fordham University, Purdue University, and Columbia University. He then became a high school football coach, leading East Meadow High School on Long Island, New York to a 46–9–1 record en route to five league championships. He then moved to Derby High School in Derby, Connecticut, where he helped the Red Raiders go 116–30–8 — including undefeated seasons in 1968, 1969, 1972, 1973, and 1975.

=== Death and legacy ===
Lou DeFilippo died on March 5, 2000, in Miami, Florida.

DeFilippo was inducted into the Fordham Athletic Hall of Fame and made a member of the Connecticut High School Coaches Association Hall of Fame in 1981.
