= White Hills (Shelton) =

- Neighborhood
- Interactive map of White Hills
- Coordinates: 41.3339°N 73.151°W
- Country: United States
- State: Connecticut
- County: Fairfield
- City: Shelton
- Time zone: UTC-5:00 (Eastern)
  - Summer (DST): UTC-4:00 (Eastern)
- Area code: 203

White Hills is a section of the city of Shelton, Connecticut. It is one of the oldest parts of the city, with historical buildings dating to the early 18th century. It is the most rural part of Shelton, though much of it is now suburban.

White Hills got its name for the higher altitude it has compared with the rest of Shelton. The rolling hills in the area were named White for several reasons: The snow melted slower in the spring, the visible lyme rock, and the wild dogwood blossoms.

White Hills is bordered by Monroe to the north and west, the Housatonic River to the east, the "downtown" to the southeast, and Huntington to the southwest. Its road borders are roughly East Village Road to the east and north, Beardsley Road to the north, and Route 110 (Leavenworth and Shelton Roads) to the west and south. However, Maple Avenue (to the southwest) is considered part of Lower White Hills, but claimed by both Huntington and White Hills.

The Lower White Hills Cemetery (1700) is on Maple Avenue, just west of Route 110.

White Hills has a volunteer fire department, Shelton Fire Company 5. The fire company was formed in 1947 and the first truck was purchased in 1948, costing $7,000. Members signed personal notes to assure the payment of the new vehicle. They also held two-day country fairs to help in the payment for the new fire truck. Those two-day fairs were a tremendous amount of work. Some of the attractions were, animals and produce on exhibit, there was a baked goods table, white elephant table, snack bar, games of chance, raffles, square dancing, and many other attractions. The department has frequently won honors at local marching parades. White Hills has both a rural character and access to nearby shopping areas. The section of town is equidistant from Monroe center, Huntington center, and downtown Shelton. There is a recreational facility in the area called East Village Park, established in the early 1980s.

Landmarks:

- Lincoln Spruce
- French's Corner
