= Harry Mortimer Hubbell =

American classical philologist (1881–1971)

- Born: August 30, 1881; Belvue, Kansas, U.S.
- Died: February 24, 1971 (aged 89); North Haven, Connecticut, U.S.
- Spouse: Alice Pendleton Clark

Academic background
- Education: Yale University (BA, MA, PhD)
- Thesis: The Influence of Isocrates on Cicero, Dionysius and Aristides

Academic work
- Discipline: Classics
- Sub-discipline: Greek literature Classical rhetoric
- Institutions: University of California, Berkeley; Goucher College

Harry Mortimer Hubbell (August 30, 1881 – February 24, 1971) was an American classicist.

== Early life and education ==
Hubbell was born in Belvue, Kansas. He graduated from Hillhouse High School in New Haven, Connecticut, received a BA, MA and PhD from Yale University.

== Career ==
Hubbell held a visiting professorship at the University of California, Berkeley. He was a Fulbright Fellow and, at Goucher College, one of the first John Hay Whitney Professors.

His main area of research interest was Greek and Latin rhetoric. His dissertation was titled The Influence of Isocrates on Cicero, Dionysius and Aristides.

== Personal life ==
Hubbell was married to Alice Pendleton Clark. He died on February 24, 1971.
