= Wilbur Cross High School =

Location
- 181 Mitchell Drive; New Haven, Connecticut 06511; United States; 41°19′27″N 72°54′31″W

Information
- Founded: 1920 (106 years ago)
- School district: New Haven Public Schools
- CEEB code: 070520
- Principal: Matthew Brown
- Grades: 9-12
- Enrollment: 1,721 (2023-2024)
- Campus type: Urban
- Colors: Red and white
- Athletics conference: Southern Connecticut Conference
- Team name: The Governors
- Website: wilburcross.nhps.net/o/wilburcross

Wilbur Cross High School is a four-year public high school in the East Rock neighborhood of New Haven, Connecticut, United States, serving ninth through twelfth grades. The school is named after Connecticut Governor Wilbur Lucius Cross and is the largest school in the New Haven Public Schools in the number of students as well as teachers. The school operates with two semesters and four marking periods.

== History ==
The school was founded in 1920 as Commercial High School, taking over the vocational education components that had been included in Hillhouse High School. Commercial became a comprehensive school in 1949 and was renamed in memory of Governor Cross in 1950.

In 1960 (1961?) Wilbur Cross and Hillhouse High School were both constructed using identical layouts, save one elevation change between wings. Cross had red external panels, while Hillhouse was blue. There were 3 different offerings: College Prep, Business, and General. There were only 3 grades. In 1963, the first graduating class that started there had 444 members, out of roughly 700 that had started as sophomores. There were roughly 2,000 students.

Wilbur Cross High School, built in 1926, is not only one of New Haven’s oldest educational buildings but also a facility facing significant challenges due to years of deferred maintenance. Recent reports highlight that mold has forced the closure of critical spaces, including the library, music room, and swimming pool. Teachers arriving on the first day of school encountered dead rodents and cockroaches while flooding in classrooms has become routine. These dire conditions were voiced during a New Haven Board of Education meeting, where parents, teachers, and students described the school as "rotting from the inside." Jake Halpern, president of the Wilbur Cross Parent Teacher Association, labeled the situation a crisis, urging immediate action. [All According to Students and Yale Daily News]

== Academics ==
Wilbur Cross has four career-themed "academies": Business & Fine Arts, Health & Culinary Sciences, Law & Public Service, and the International Academy of Digital Arts & Sciences.

Wilbur Cross High School offers 15 Advanced Placement (AP) Classes. Students are required to take the exams. The exam fee is covered by the school district.

Wilbur Cross High School has a reputation for diversity, with a student body predominantly composed of Hispanic/Latino students. Approximately 25% of the students are enrolled in Advanced Placement (AP) courses, where academic rigor is more emphasized compared to standard classes, which make up the remaining 75% and often lack encouragement for students to challenge themselves. However, discussions have emerged within the community about the school's capacity, as it currently exceeds its maximum enrollment by 500 students, raising concerns about potential closure or restructuring.

== Athletics ==
Wilbur Cross's mascot is the Governor, in recognition of the school's namesake. They compete in the Oronoque Division of the Southern Connecticut Conference. These sports are offered:

=== Fall ===
- Football
- Boys' Soccer
- Girls' Soccer
- Girls' Volleyball
- Boys' Cross Country
- Girls' Cross Country
- Boys' Swimming
- Girls' Swimming (combined with East Haven)
- Cheerleading

=== Winter ===
- Boys' Basketball
- Girls' Basketball
- Boys' Indoor Track
- Girls' Indoor Track

=== Spring ===
- Baseball
- Softball
- Lacrosse
- Coed Tennis
- Golf
- Boys' Outdoor Track
- Girls' Outdoor Track

=== Basketball ===
The school has a long history on the basketball court. At one time, Cross teams were regular participants in the New England Tournament, an event of up to 15,000 spectators at the Boston Garden. However, Connecticut withdrew from the tournament after a riot in 1958 during the tournament final between Wilbur Cross and a Somerville, Massachusetts team. New Haven high schools were successful in the Connecticut high school basketball leagues through the 1960s. Cross High School and nearby rival Hillhouse High School won the state championship in nine of ten years of the decade.

One of the stars of the late 1960s teams, John "Super John" Williamson, averaged nearly 40 points per game for the Governors in 1970 and went to play college ball at New Mexico State University and star as a pro in the American Basketball Association.

In the 1973–1974 season The Washington Post ranked Cross the No. 1 high school team in the nation and a headline in the New York Post proclaimed Cross "The Best High School Team in the World" after the Governors defeated New York City's DeWitt Clinton High School team. The 1999-2000 team was considered the state's best, with a 24–0 record, until being upset by Bridgeport Central High School in the quarterfinals of the state tournament. The 2007-2008 team had an undefeated regular season, going 20–0. The Governors won the division, the SCC tournament, and the BABC Holiday Classic, but lost to Lyman Hall by three points in the quarter-finals of the state tournament.

=== Other sports ===
The boys' soccer team won its division and advanced to the final 16 of the state championship in 2007. The boys' indoor track team finished second in Connecticut, also in the 2007-2008 year.

The football team plays Hillhouse High School every year on Thanksgiving in the Elm City Bowl in an annual game that dates back to 1920.

The school has a culinary team and management team that compete in the National ProStart Invitational competition. The restaurant management team took 1st place in the National ProStart Invitational competition in 2023. The current coach of both teams, chef Nathaniel Bradshaw, won National ProStart Educator of the year in 2016.

== Notable alumni ==
- Ben Allison (born 1966), jazz bassist and composer
- Lauren Ambrose (born 1978), actress and singer(attended)
- Troy Bradford (born 1966, class of 1985), All-American basketball player at Fairfield University
- Bob Clifford (c. 1913–2006), football player and coach, who served as the head football coach at Colby College and at the University of Vermont
- Lubbie Harper Jr. (class of 1961), Connecticut Supreme Court judge
- Travis Jones (class of 2018), NFL defensive tackle
- Casimir Loxsom (born 1991), Olympic 800m specialist
- Dom Perno, former basketball coach at the University of Connecticut
- Richard Proto (class of 1958), cryptographer elected to the United States National Security Agency Hall of Honor
- John Williamson (born 1951, class of 1970), basketball player in the American Basketball Association, 1973–1981
