= New Haven Public Schools =

School district in Connecticut, United States

Address
- 54 Meadow Street New Haven, New Haven, Connecticut, 06519; United States

District information
- Type: Public
- Grades: PK-12
- Superintendent: Dr. Madeline Negrón
- NCES District ID: 0902790

Students and staff
- Students: 21,635
- Teachers: 1,609
- Staff: 4,239
- Student–teacher ratio: 13.44

Other information
- Website: http://www.nhps.net/

New Haven Public Schools (NHPS) is a school district serving the city of New Haven, Connecticut.

Wilbur Cross High School and Hillhouse High School are New Haven's two largest public secondary schools and the only non-magnet secondary schools in the district. Almost all of the district's schools have been renovated under a 15-year, $1.375 billion School Construction Program.

Out of the 45 New Haven Public Schools, there are:

- 31 elementary and middle schools
- 9 high schools
- 4 transitional schools

Statistics and Demographics

- Total students 20,474
- Total certified teachers 184
- Total full-time staff 2,500
- Number of schools 89

Enrollment, by race/ethnicity

- Black: 46%
- Hispanic: 37%
- White: 14%
- Asian: 2%
- Students eligible for free and reduced-price meals 77%
- English learners 12%
- Graduation rate 62%

== High School ==
- Co-op High School
- High School in the Community
- Hill Regional Career High School
- Hillhouse High School
- Metropolitan Business Academy
- New Haven Academy
- Sound School
- Wilbur Cross High School

== 6-12 ==
- Engineering & Science University Magnet School

== Middle School ==
- Betsy Ross Arts (5–8)

== K-8 ==
- Augusta Lewis Troup School
- Barnard School
- Benjamin Jepson Magnet
- Bishop Woods Architecture & Design Magnet
- Celentano School (PK-8)
- Clemente Leadership Academy
- Clinton Avenue School
- Conte West Hills School (PK-8)
- Davis Academy for Arts and Design Innovation (PK-8)
- East Rock School
- Edgewood School
- Elm City Montessori
- Fair Haven School
- Family Academy of Multilingual Exploration
- Hill Central Music Academy
- John C Daniels School of International Communication
- John S Martinez Sea & Sky STEM Magnet School
- King Robinson Interdistrict Magnet School (PK-8)
- LW Beecher Museum School of Arts & Sciences Interdistrict Magnet (PK-8)
- Mauro Sheridan Science, Technology & Communications School
- Nathan Hale School (PK-8)
- Truman School (PK-8)
- Wexler-Grant Community School (PK-8)
- Worthington Hooker School

== Elementary ==
- Barack Obama School (K-4)
- Lincoln Bassett School(PK-6)

== Early Childhood Education ==
- Dr. Reginald Mayo Early Learning Center
