= Shelton High School (Connecticut) =

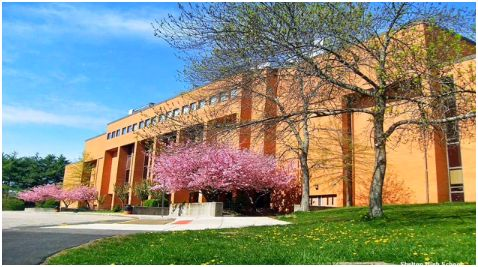

Location
- 120 Meadow Street; Shelton, Connecticut 06484; United States; 41°19′17″N 73°07′01″W

Information
- Type: Public
- Established: 1973 (53 years ago)
- School district: Shelton Public Schools
- CEEB code: 070665
- Headmaster: Kathleen Riddle
- Faculty: 155
- Grades: 9-12
- Gender: Coeducational
- Enrollment: 1,311 (2023-2024)
- Colors: Orange and black
- Athletics conference: Southern Connecticut Conference
- Mascot: Gael
- Newspaper: The Gael
- Website: sheltonhigh.sheltonpublicschools.org

Shelton High School (SHS) is a public high school in Shelton, Connecticut, in eastern Fairfield County. It has an enrollment of approximately 1,300 in grades 9 through 12.

== History ==
Shelton High School during construction in 1973

The first four SHS graduates received their diplomas on June 26, 1889. In 1894, the First School Society became the Town School Committee, with Walter D. Hood as the first school superintendent.

The school received national and international attention in 2011 when the headmaster banned a senior and two friends from attending the senior prom because the students had taped a message of 12-inch high cardboard letters above the school's entrance inviting Tate's classmate to go to the dance with him. The punishment prompted state lawmakers Jason Perillo (R-Shelton) and Sean Williams (R-Waterbury) to introduce an amendment to a pending bill that, with an exception for vandalism and violence, would require schools to offer parents an alternative to banning students from school-related activities as means of punishment. On May 14, the headmaster held a press conference reversing the decision, saying that "the level of distraction created by this incident" had "affected the culture of Shelton High School" and that "international notoriety" had forced her to reverse herself.

== Extracurricular activities ==
=== The Gael Magazine ===
The school magazine is called the Gael Magazine. This magazine publishes in the fall, winter and spring.

=== Athletics ===
Shelton High is part of the Housatonic Division of the Southern Connecticut Conference. The school offers a variety of freshman, JV, and Varsity teams. The following sports run in the respective seasons:

SHS Sports
FALL	WINTER	SPRING
Football	Boys Basketball	Baseball
Boys Soccer	Girls Basketball	Softball
Girls Soccer	Indoor Track	Girls Lacrosse
Cross Country	Wrestling	Boys Volleyball
Girls Swimming	Boys Swimming	Tennis
Girls Volleyball		Golf
Field Hockey		Outdoor Track & Field
Cheerleading		

The Shelton Gaels high school football team won the state championship in 1988, 1995, 2000, and 2003.

The Shelton Gaels high school boys' volleyball team won the state championship in 2004 and 2005, with a 46-0 record. The team won the Southern Connecticut Conference title in 2015, 2017, 2022, 2025 and 2026.

The Shelton Gaels Varsity Cheerleading squad won the state championship in the 2000-2001 season.

The Shelton boys' cross country team won its first division championship, and the SCC championship in 2007, making its first trip to the New England championships. In 2008, it placed second in the CIAC State Open Championships, and fourth in the New England Championships.

== Notable alumni ==
- Dan Orlovsky (2001), NFL quarterback
- Dan Debicella (1992), Connecticut State Senator
