= Shelton, Connecticut =

City in Connecticut, United States

- City
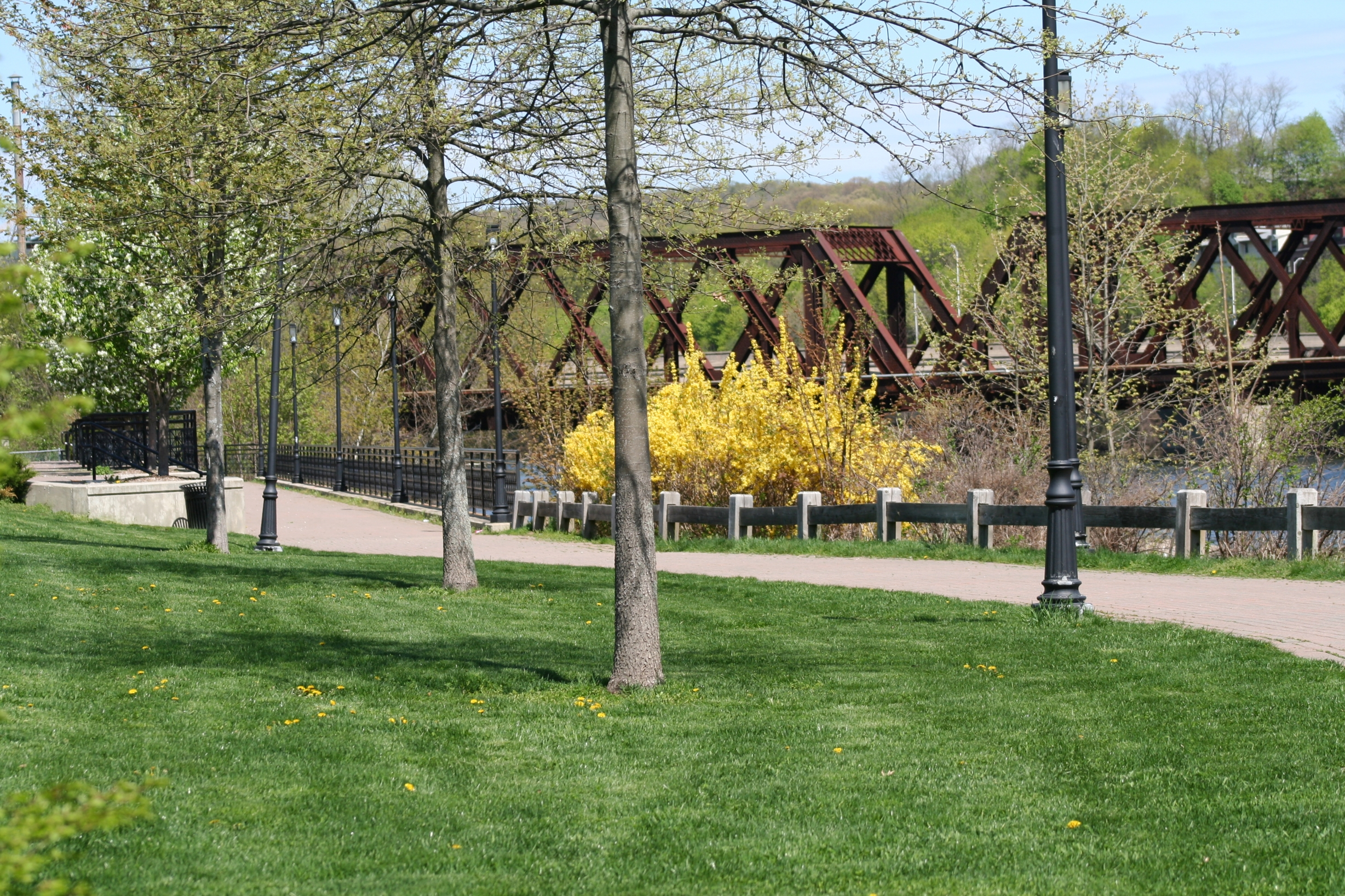
- View from the Shelton River Walk

- Seal
- Motto: "Vision To See, Faith To Believe, Courage To Do"
- Coordinates: 41°18′15″N 73°08′17″W
- Country: United States
- U.S. state: Connecticut
- County: Fairfield
- Region: Naugatuck Valley
- Incorporated (town): 1789
- Incorporated (city): 1915

Government
  - Type: Mayor-board of aldermen
  - Mayor: Mark A. Lauretti (R)

Area
  - Total: 31.90 sq mi (82.63 km^{2})
  - Land: 30.63 sq mi (79.33 km^{2})
  - Water: 1.27 sq mi (3.29 km^{2})
- Elevation: 62 ft (19 m)

Population (2020)
  - Total: 40,869
  - Density: 1,334/sq mi (515.2/km^{2})
- Time zone: UTC-5 (Eastern)
  - Summer (DST): UTC-4 (Eastern)
- ZIP Code: 06484
- Area codes: 203/475
- FIPS code: 09-68100
- GNIS feature ID: 0210800
- Website: cityofshelton.org

Shelton is a city in Fairfield County, Connecticut, United States. The population was 40,869 at the 2020 United States Census. The city is part of the Naugatuck Valley Planning Region.

== History ==
=== Origins ===
Shelton was settled by the English as part of the town of Stratford in 1639. On May 15, 1656, the Court of the Colony of Connecticut in Hartford affirmed that the town of Stratford included all of the territory 12 miles (19 km) inland from Long Island Sound, between the Housatonic River and the Fairfield town line. In 1662, Stratford selectmen Lt. Joseph Judson, Captain Joseph Hawley and John Minor had secured all the written deeds of transfer from the Golden Hill Paugussett Indian Nation for this vast territory that comprises the present-day towns of Trumbull, Shelton and Monroe. Shelton was split off from Stratford in 1789, as Huntington (named for Samuel Huntington). The current name originated in a manufacturing village started in the 1860s named for the Shelton Company founded by Edward N. Shelton—also founder of Ousatonic Water Power Company. The rapidly growing borough of Shelton incorporated as a city in 1915 and was consolidated with the town of Huntington in 1919, establishing the present city of Shelton.

=== Decline of Shelton's industry ===
Shelton was the site of one of the largest arson fires in the United States history. It happened in 1975 when the Sponge Rubber Products plant (formerly owned by B.F. Goodrich) was set on fire. Charles Moeller, president of parent company Grand Sheet Metal Products, was acquitted of criminal charges, but in a suit under civil law (where preponderance of evidence suffices to establish a factual claim), a jury found in 1988 the insurer was entitled to disallow claims on the fire losses, based on the finding that the company's top officials arranged the fire to claim insurance money. Eight others were convicted or pleaded guilty.

The explosion that destroyed the Sponge Rubber Plant on Canal Street in 1975 marked the start of the decline of Shelton's industries. During the remainder of the 1970s and 1980s several firms that operated factories along the banks of the Housatonic River either went out of business or relocated to areas where labor and operating costs were cheaper. In 1995, Sikorsky Aircraft closed a plant off Bridgeport Avenue that manufactured electrical components for helicopters.

=== Rise of Shelton's office space ===
With the completion of Route 8, new office spaces and businesses were attracted to the town, due to its Fairfield County location coupled with low costs of doing business as opposed to places such as Stamford or Greenwich. Major firms such as Tetley Tea, TIE Communication, I.T.T., Black and Decker, Sikorsky Aircraft, Gama Aviation, Chesebrough-Pond's, Tetra-Pak, General Electric, and Bunker Ramo. Over 2,000,000 square feet (190,000 m^{2}) of corporate office space spread across 12 buildings was constructed by the R.D. Scinto corporation alone.

=== Downtown revitalization ===
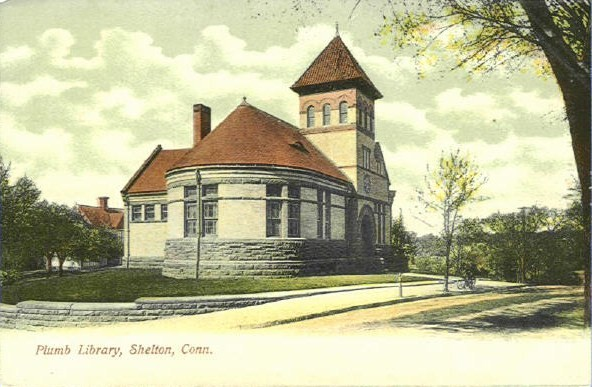
Plumb Library, c. 1905

Efforts are underway to restore nineteenth-century industrial buildings in the downtown area; those that were beyond repair were demolished in the late 1990s and early 2000s and replaced with the Veteran's Memorial and a farmer's market. The 10-acre (40,000 m^{2}) Riverwalk Park next to the Veterans Memorial was created on the site of the former Sponge Rubber Plant. Other buildings along Howe Avenue, one of the city's main thoroughfares, have been restored, while developers have renovated two 19th-century factory buildings on Bridge Street, converting them into luxury condominiums. Several downtown streets have been reconstructed as part of a streetscape improvement project: sidewalks were reconstructed with brick and cobblestone, trees were planted, and some power lines were rerouted underground to improve the appearance of Shelton's central business district. In March 2008, Connecticut Governor M. Jodi Rell announced that after negotiations with State Senator Dan Debicella and State Representative Jason Perillo, state bond funds in the amount of $2 million would be directed toward additional infrastructure improvements.

=== Other events ===
In November 2007, a tree growing on Soundview Avenue in Shelton was selected and felled to be the Rockefeller Center Christmas tree.

On July 31, 2009, a line of heavy thunderstorms with weak rotation spawned an EF1 tornado, which touched down with wind speeds between 95 and 105 miles per hour. According to WTNH, the most concentrated damage was along the Oronoque Trail, where many trees were blown down. There were no injuries or fatalities.

In November 2013, a tree located on Kazo Drive was picked to be the second Rockefeller Center Christmas tree from Shelton.

== Geography ==
According to the United States Census Bureau, the city has a total area of 31.9 square miles (83 km^{2}), of which 30.6 square miles (79 km^{2}) is land and 1.4 square miles (3.6 km^{2}), or 4.26%, is water.

=== Neighborhoods ===
- Downtown
- Coram Gardens
- White Hills
- Soundview Avenue
- South End
- Booth Hill Road
- Bridgeport Avenue
- Huntington
- Pine Rock Park
- Long Hill

== Demographics ==
Historical population
Census	Pop.	Note	%±
1790	2,742		—
1800	2,792		1.8%
1810	2,770		−0.8%
1820	2,805		1.3%
1830	1,371		−51.1%
1840	1,326		−3.3%
1850	1,301		−1.9%
1860	1,477		13.5%
1870	1,527		3.4%
1880	2,499		63.7%
1890	4,006		60.3%
1900	5,572		39.1%
1910	6,545		17.5%
1920	9,475		44.8%
1930	10,113		6.7%
1940	10,971		8.5%
1950	12,694		15.7%
1960	18,190		43.3%
1970	27,165		49.3%
1980	31,314		15.3%
1990	35,418		13.1%
2000	38,101		7.6%
2010	39,559		3.8%
2020	40,869		3.3%
U.S. Decennial Census

=== 2020 census ===
As of the 2020 census, Shelton had a population of 40,869. The population density was 1,334.2 inhabitants per square mile (515.1/km^{2}). The median age was 47.0 years. 17.4% of residents were under the age of 18 and 22.3% of residents were 65 years of age or older. For every 100 females there were 94.4 males, and for every 100 females age 18 and over there were 92.0 males age 18 and over.

100.0% of residents lived in urban areas, while 0.0% lived in rural areas.

There were 16,356 households in Shelton, of which 26.1% had children under the age of 18 living in them. Of all households, 53.1% were married-couple households, 15.8% were households with a male householder and no spouse or partner present, and 25.0% were households with a female householder and no spouse or partner present. About 26.4% of all households were made up of individuals and 12.9% had someone living alone who was 65 years of age or older.

There were 17,174 housing units, of which 4.8% were vacant. The homeowner vacancy rate was 0.8% and the rental vacancy rate was 5.4%.

Racial composition as of the 2020 census
Race	Number	Percent
White	32,733	80.1%
Black or African American	1,966	4.8%
American Indian and Alaska Native	50	0.1%
Asian	1,822	4.5%
Native Hawaiian and Other Pacific Islander	17	0.0%
Some other race	1,335	3.3%
Two or more races	2,946	7.2%
Hispanic or Latino (of any race)	4,080	10.0%

=== 2010 census ===
As of the 2010 census, there were 14,190 households, of which 32.8% had children under the age of 18 living with them, 62.9% were married couples living together, 8.5% had a female householder with no husband present, and 25.7% were non-families. 21.8% of all households were made up of individuals, and 9.2% had someone living alone who was 65 years of age or older. The average household size was 2.65 and the average family size was 3.11.

In the city, the population was spread out, with 24.9% under the age of 18, and 20.1% who were 65 years of age or older.

=== Income ===
The median income for a household in the city was $114,739, and the per capita income was $55,824.

== Economy ==
=== Notable companies ===
- Bic Corporation conducts U.S. operations from Shelton
- Cartier SA has an office in Shelton
- Computershare (formerly Transcentive, Inc.), 2 Enterprise Drive
- Hubbell Incorporated is headquartered in Shelton, 40 Waterview Drive
- NEC Unified Solutions (formerly Nitsuko America), manufacturer of business telephone systems, 4 Forest Parkway
- PerkinElmer, Inc. houses their Life and Analytical sciences division on Bridgeport Avenue. PerkinElmer, formerly Perkin-Elmer Instruments, is best known for building the optical components of the Hubble Space Telescope.
- Pitney Bowes employs 1,460 in the city
- Prudential Annuities headquarters
- Sikorsky Aircraft Corporation has an Overhaul and Repair (O&R) facility in Shelton

== Arts and culture ==
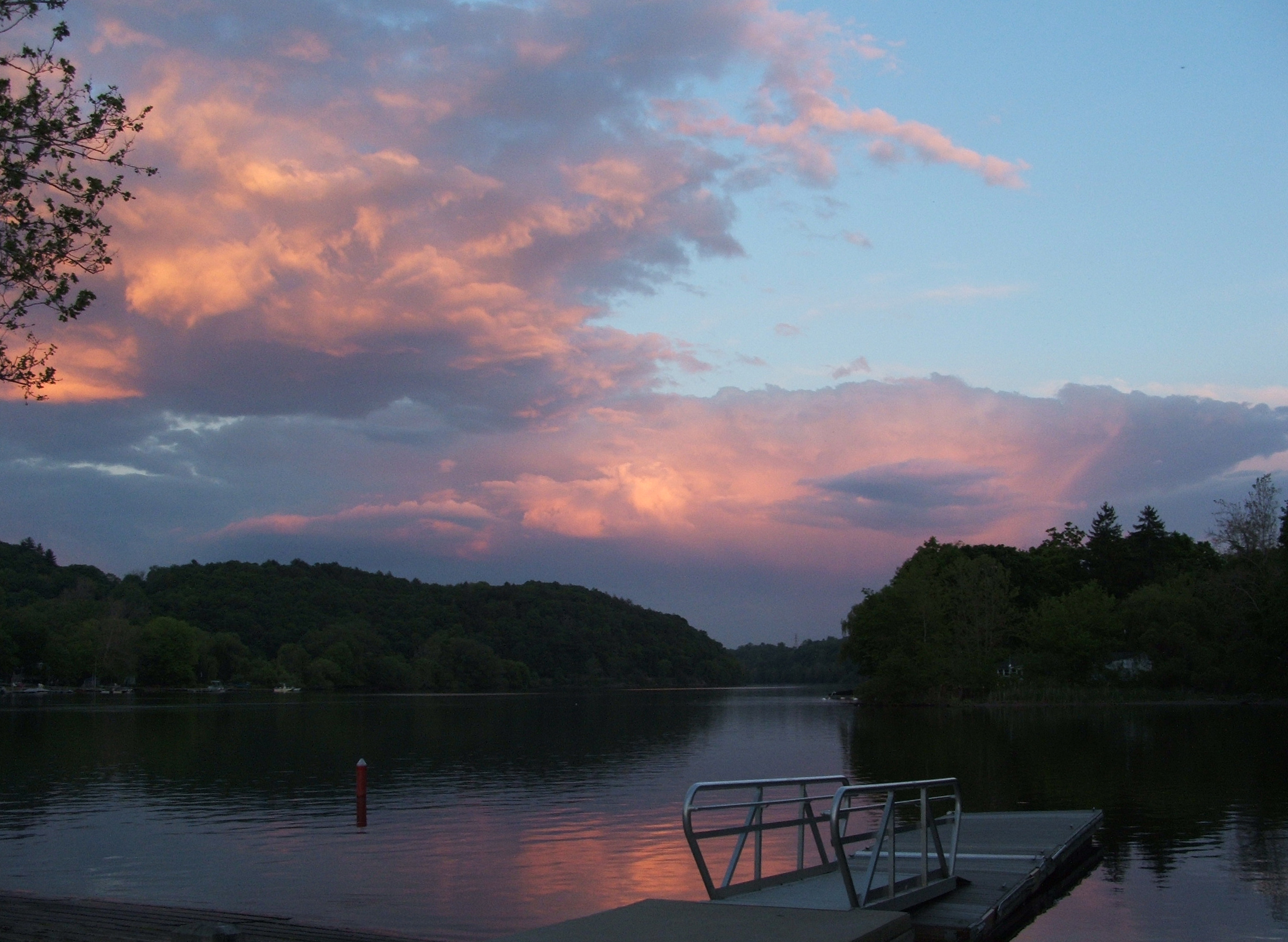
Indian Well State Park boat launch at Sunset

National Register of Historic Places:

- Commodore Hull School
- Huntington Center Historic District
- Plumb Memorial Library

== Parks and recreation ==
There are two private golf courses in town. Highland Golf Club of Shelton is located in the downtown Shelton area where it was founded in 1900. It is a 9-hole course (with 10 greens to allow alternating #2 and #11 where the tee shot goes over Perry Hill Road) in which the original designer Frank Gates created difficult greens. The clubhouse's 1920s era structure remained as the core to the clubhouse until a fire in 2024 completely destroyed the building. A rebuilt clubhouse has opened as of spring 2026. Brownson Country Club is an 18-hole venue located in the Huntington section of Shelton. There is an annual competition between the clubs for the "Mayor's Trophy", alternating the venue each year.

The City of Shelton's goal is to preserve at least 15% of the land as permanently protected, locally controlled open space in the following three forms: City of Shelton Public Open Space properties, Privately owned farmland protected by the purchase of development rights, and properties held by the non-profit Shelton Land Conservation Trust. As of 2009, these forms of open space amount to 13% of the City and more than 2,700 acres (11 km^{2}). The City of Shelton owns close to 2,000 acres (8.1 km^{2}) of Public Open Space, Protected Farmland is 411 acres (1.66 km^{2}), and the Shelton Land Trust organization has preserved 364 acres (1.47 km^{2}).

There are over 15 miles (24 km) of hiking trails in Shelton, including a portion of the Paugussett "Blue Blazed" trail, part of an 800-mile (1,300 km) network of hiking trails throughout the state. There is opportunity for fishing, boating, geocaching and letterboxing, hiking, walking and biking. Dogs are welcomed when on leash. There is no hunting on city-owned open space, by ordinance.

== Government ==
Republican Mark Lauretti has served as mayor since taking office in 1991.

The Republican Party has controlled the city government since the 1980s. Before the 2007 Elections, the Board of Aldermen consisted of five Republican members, two Citizens' United members, and one Democratic member. Mayor Lauretti was re-elected for an eighteenth consecutive term on November 4, 2025. The current Board of Aldermen consists of six Republicans and two Democrats.

Political representation at the state level has been Republican since the 1960s. Republican State Senator Jason Perillo of Shelton won a Special Election to replace Senator Kevin Kelly of Stratford when he was appointed to a judgeship. Senator Kelly hae replaced Senator Dan Debicella in 2010 after Debicella sought election to the U.S. Congress. There are two State Assembly districts that cover Shelton. In 2025 Republican State Representative Amy Romano of the 113th District was elected in a Special Election to replace State Representative Jason Perillo who had resigned after winning a Special Election to replace State Senator Kevin Kelly. In 2007, Republican State Representative Jason Perillo won in a special election following the death of Richard O. Belden, who had represented the town for 32 years. Republican State Representative Ben McGorty of the 122nd District took office after winning a special election in 2014 following the death of previous State Representative Larry Miller.

At the federal level, Shelton is represented by Democratic U.S. Senators Richard Blumenthal and Chris Murphy in the United States Senate, along with the rest of the state. Representation of Shelton in the U.S. House of Representatives is split between the 3rd and 4th congressional districts, which are represented by Democratic U.S. Representatives Rosa DeLauro and Jim Himes, respectively. The boundary between the two congressional districts lies roughly along Route 8; Himes represents the portion of the city to the north and west of Route 8 while DeLauro represents sections of Shelton to the south and east.

Shelton is a Republican stronghold in presidential elections, as the city has voted for the GOP presidential nominee in every election since 1964 when Lyndon B. Johnson carried the municipality in his landslide election.

Shelton city vote by party in presidential elections
Year	Democratic	Republican	Third Parties
2024	43.58% 10,282	55.04% 12,985	1.38% 324
2020	45.36% 10,837	53.35% 12,747	1.56% 308
2016	38.36% 8,001	57.78% 12,051	3.86% 805
2012	44.23% 8,362	54.63% 10,327	1.14% 215
2008	47.46% 9,655	51.26% 10,428	1.27% 259
2004	41.94% 8,247	56.64% 11,137	1.42% 279
2000	46.58% 8,441	47.89% 8,678	5.53% 1,002
1996	41.29% 6,779	43.18% 7,089	15.54% 2,551
1992	28.33% 5,354	47.43% 8,963	24.24% 4,582
1988	32.46% 5,217	66.76% 10,729	0.78% 126
1984	23.67% 3,628	76.05% 11,655	0.27% 42
1980	29.55% 4,084	60.73% 8,393	9.72% 1,344
1976	37.72% 4,938	61.64% 8,056	0.73% 96
1972	26.86% 3,344	70.76% 8,810	2.39% 297
1968	38.18% 4,125	51.53% 5,567	10.29% 1,112
1964	58.54% 5,930	41.46% 4,200	0.00% 0
1960	50.87% 4,666	49.13% 4,506	0.00% 0
1956	30.23% 2,372	69.77% 5,475	0.00% 0

Voter registration and party enrollment as of October 31, 2024
Party	Active voters	Inactive voters	Total voters	Percentage
Republican	8,859	417	9,276	29.15%
Democratic	7,153	414	7,567	23.78%
Unaffiliated	13,614	935	14,549	45.71%
Minor parties	413	19	432	1.36%
Total	30,039	1,785	31,824	100%

=== Sheriff ===
Shelton is one of the few municipalities in Connecticut with its own sheriff's department, the Shelton Sheriff's Department. The sheriff's department, which is distinct from the police department, is responsible for serving legal process within the city of Shelton. The Fairfield County Sheriff's Department had a similar role before it and all other county sheriffs in Connecticut were abolished in 2000. The Shelton Sheriff's Department is not a law enforcement agency. Members are political appointees and receive no salary and derive income from fees charged to serve legal papers.

== Education ==
Shelton Public Schools include:

- Shelton High School
- Shelton Intermediate School
- Perry Hill School
- Elizabeth Shelton Elementary
- Mohegan Elementary School
- Long Hill Elementary School
- Booth Hill Elementary School
- Sunnyside Elementary School.

== Media ==
The Valley Independent Sentinel, an online-only, non-profit news site. The Shelton Herald is a weekly newspaper owned by the Hearst Corporation. The Connecticut Post and the New Haven Register also are owned by the Hearst Corporation and replicate coverage of the city provided by the Shelton Herald. Both are daily papers.

== Infrastructure ==
=== Fire department ===
The city has a 246-member all-volunteer Shelton Fire Department, which consists of four fire companies operating out of four fire stations: Echo Hose Hook & Ladder Co. 1, Huntington Fire Co. 3, Volunteer Fire Co. 4 - Pine Rock Park, and White Hills Co. 5. There is also a board of fire commissioners with a representative from each company.

=== Emergency medical services ===
Echo Hose Ambulance Corps has been providing emergency medical services to the city since 1949 and currently operates seven ambulances. It also operates the Echo Hose Ambulance Community Training Center, which offers EMT certification, a paramedic program with Yale New Haven Health, and classes for laypeople.

== Notable people ==
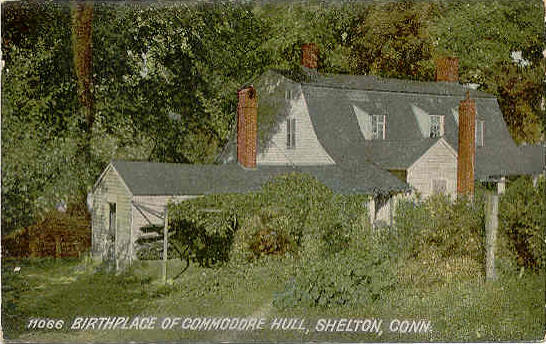
Birthplace of Isaac Hull

- Helen Barnes (1895–1925), Ziegfeld Follies Girl
- Lillian Droniak (born 1930), social media influencer with more than 18 million followers
- Dan Debicella (born 1974), the first State Senator (2006–2010) from Shelton since World War II
- Peter Leo Gerety (1912–2016), Roman Catholic bishop
- Doug Henry (born 1969), Motocross Hall of Famer
- Isaac Hull (1773–1843), Commodore in the U.S. Navy; commanded USS Constitution among other ships
- Dan Orlovsky (born 1983), Former NFL Quarterback, grew up in Shelton
- Sean Desai (born 1983), defensive coordinator for Philadelphia Eagles, grew up in Shelton
- Stephen C. Smith (born 1955), economist, author, and professor, grew up in Shelton
