= Lyman Hall High School =

Location
- 70 Pond Hill Road; Wallingford, Connecticut 06492; United States
- Coordinates: 41°26′12″N 72°49′17″W

Information
- Type: Public High School
- Motto: "We are the makers of our own fortunes"
- Established: 1957 (69 years ago)
- Sister school: Mark T. Sheehan High School
- CEEB code: 070815
- Principal: Joseph Corso
- Faculty: 131
- Grades: 9-12
- Enrollment: 932 (2023-2024)
- Colors: Blue, white, and orange
- Athletics conference: Southern Connecticut Conference
- Mascot: Trojan
- Website: lhhs.wallingford.k12.ct.us

Lyman Hall High School is a public high school located at 70 Pond Hill Road in Wallingford, Connecticut. It is part of Wallingford Public Schools and one of two public high schools in Wallingford, Mark T. Sheehan being the other.

== History ==
Lyman Hall High School is named in honor of Doctor Lyman Hall, a signatory party of the Declaration of Independence who was born in Wallingford on April 12, 1724.

The school's original location was on South Main Street, in a building constructed in 1916–1917 that today serves as Wallingford's Town Hall. In 1957 the school was moved to its current location at 70 Pond Hill Road in southeast Wallingford.

== Academic programs ==
Lyman Hall High School has a wide range of academic courses. The school is one of only four in the entire state of Connecticut that offers courses in all of the career clusters identified by the Connecticut Department of Education. In addition to what are considered normal academic areas such as mathematics and science, students can elect to take courses in agriculture; transportation, communication, and construction technologies; food service; family and consumer science; and medical careers.

Lyman Hall offers Spanish, French, Italian, and Latin language courses. German is offered in place of Latin at Wallingford's sister school, Mark T. Sheehan High School.

=== Agricultural education ===
Lyman Hall is a Regional Agricultural Science & Technology Education Center (formerly Vocational Agriculture). Lyman Hall enrolls more than 300 students from Wallingford and nine surrounding towns for this program.

Lyman Hall's agricultural program offers classes in eight areas: agricultural mechanics/landscape management, aquaculture, companion animal, food science, large animal technology, plant science, veterinary science, and wildlife biology.
