= Cheshire Correctional Institution =

Prison in Connecticut, US

Coordinates: 41°31′18″N 72°54′00″W

- Interactive map of Cheshire Correctional Institution
- Location: 900 Highland Avenue Cheshire, Connecticut
- Status: Open
- Capacity: 1580
- Opened: 1913
- Managed by: Connecticut Department of Correction
- Director: Warden Scott Erfe

Cheshire Correctional Institution is a Connecticut Department of Correction state prison for men located in Cheshire, New Haven County, Connecticut. The facility was built beginning in 1910, partly by the inmates of the Wethersfield State Prison, and opened in 1913 as the Cheshire Reformatory for male youths ages 16 to 24. In 1982, the state's Manson Youth Institution opened adjacent to the Cheshire Correctional Institution, which was re-designated as an adult prison.

The capacity of Cheshire Correctional Institution is 1580 inmates.

== Notable inmates ==
Inmate Name	Register Number	Status	Details
Earl Bradley	415266	Serving 14 life sentences without parole.	Former pediatrician in Delaware who, in 2009, was arrested and convicted for the rape and sexual exploitation of 103 children. Years later, Bradley was moved to Connecticut's department of corrections.
Raymond J. Clark III	371189	Serving a 44 year sentence. Scheduled for release in 2053.	Perpetrator of the 2009 Murder of Annie Le in which Clark killed the Yale University student on campus while he was working as a laboratory technician for the institution at the time.
William Devin Howell	305917	Serving 7 life sentences without parole.	Murdered 7 people in 2003.
Matthew Steven Johnson	91492	Serving a 180-year sentence.	Murdered 3 people between 2000-2001.
Ronald A. Rajcok	223597	Serving a 36-year sentence.	Participated in the gang-rape and murder of 13-year old Maryann Measles in 1997.
