= Earl Bradley =

American serial child rapist

- Born: Earl Brian Bradley; May 10, 1953 (age 73); Philadelphia, Pennsylvania, U.S.
- Occupation: Pediatrician (former)
- Status: Incarcerated at the Cheshire Correctional Institution in Cheshire, Connecticut
- Motive: Sexual gratification
- Convictions: June 23, 2011: First-degree rape (×14); Assault (×7); Sexual exploitation of a child (×3)
- Criminal charges: Child sexual abuse (×529)
- Penalty: 14 consecutive life sentences without possibility of parole plus 165 years

Details
- Victims: ≥127 children (1,400 families alleged abuse civilly)
- Span of crimes: 1995–2009
- States: Delaware and Pennsylvania
- Date apprehended: December 18, 2009

Earl Brian Bradley (born May 10, 1953) is a former pediatrician from Philadelphia, Pennsylvania and convicted serial child rapist. He was indicted in 2010 on 471 charges of molesting, raping, and exploiting 103 child patients (102 girls and 1 boy). Some of the victims were as young as three months old. He was charged in April 2010 with an additional 58 offenses in relation to the abuse of 24 additional victims. He has been described by a number of reputable news outlets and commentators as "the worst pedophile in American history." Dr. Eli Newberger, a professor at Harvard Medical School and a pediatrician who studied child abuse cases for almost 40 years, described Bradley's case as "the worst pediatrician abuse case I've ever heard of;" Bradley had access to an estimated 7,000 pediatric patients. According to a personal injury law firm in Baltimore, one of many representing class action plaintiffs, 1,400 families in the class action alleged abuse. Bradley was ultimately found guilty on all consolidated charges brought and was sentenced to 14 consecutive terms of life in prison without the possibility of parole, plus an additional 165 years, June 26, 2011. His conviction was affirmed by the Delaware Supreme Court on September 6, 2012. In the wake of his arrest, it emerged that he had faced accusations of child abuse as early as 1995 in both Delaware and Pennsylvania.

== Life and reputation ==
Bradley was born and raised in Philadelphia. He graduated from the Temple University School of Medicine in 1983 and completed his pediatrics residency at Thomas Jefferson University Hospital in 1986. Around 1984, he began working at Frankford-Torresdale hospital on Knights Road in Northeast Philadelphia. He opened his own practice in a small complex just a few blocks away, at Academy and Red Lion Roads in Morrell Park. He continued to work at Jefferson until a sudden move to Lewes, Delaware on the Delmarva Peninsula in 1995. The move was abrupt and poorly planned, with many patients complaining that they were not even notified that appointments had been cancelled.

In Lewes, Bradley was widely regarded as eccentric. His practice, BayBees Pediatrics, had patients from area farming and resort communities. The medical offices were ostentatiously decorated with carnival rides and other child-friendly decorations, such as a giant statue of Buzz Lightyear from Disney's Toy Story and a small movie theatre showing Disney movies. He owned several Volkswagen Beetle vehicles which were painted yellow and black with eyes and a tail to resemble bumblebees.

== Accusations of child abuse ==
The first known allegations of inappropriate conduct by Bradley came in 1994 when Thomas Jefferson University Hospital investigated a patient's complaint of sexual misconduct. There was a second allegation in 1995. The hospital could not verify the claim, and records remain sealed. Bradley promptly closed his fledgling private practice and relocated with his children to Lewes, where he took a job with Beebe Medical Center.

In 2004, Bradley's sister Lynda Barnes, who had served as an office manager at his medical office, alerted the state medical society that parents had complained to her about inappropriate touching by Bradley. Barnes also reported that Bradley physically and emotionally abused his own son, and stole prescription antidepressants from the office.

Allegations were made again in 2005. Police records show that a nurse reported that he videotaped kids playing and other doctors reported complaints about long and unnecessary vaginal exams. When police in Milford, Delaware sought a warrant to arrest him for inappropriately touching a child patient, the Attorney General's office concluded at the time that there was insufficient evidence to warrant prosecution.

On December 16, 2009, following a year-long investigation and complaints of inappropriate touching by a two-year-old patient, Bradley was arrested and charged with nine counts, including a felony charge for a fourth degree rape of a two-year-old patient. Soon after, relying on more than 13 hours of videotaped rapes and molestations discovered by police in Bradley's home and office, additional warrants were issued. These included felony warrants for several counts of child exploitation and first-degree rape.

== Arrest, indictment, and conviction ==
Bradley surrendered to authorities on December 18, 2009. His bail was set at $2.9 million cash, which was not posted. An initial preliminary hearing was delayed after prison officials placed Bradley on suicide watch. His attorney, Eugene Maurer, denied that Bradley was suicidal but complained that prison officials had deprived him of his prescription glasses.

In February 2010, a grand jury sitting for the Delaware Superior Court indicted Bradley on 471 charges, including counts of rape and exploitation. 103 victims were identified in the indictment, though the Attorney General indicated that they expected to identify even more victims. The indictment included allegations that Bradley had forced children as young as three months old to engage in intercourse and oral sex. It also revealed that Bradley had videotaped sexual assaults during which his victims "appeared to lose consciousness" from Bradley choking them by forcing oral sex on his child victims. The videos also show children in diapers screaming as they attempted to escape from Bradley before he raped them in an outbuilding on the property. Dr. Newberger alleged that "There is a reasonable likelihood for a lot of these children of having subsequent symptoms."

Though his private lawyers quit after Delaware took steps to freeze his assets, Bradley was afforded a public defender and arraigned on March 24, 2010. He pleaded not guilty to all charges. A follow-up hearing was scheduled for May 17.

The Delaware Board of Medical Practice suspended Bradley's license permanently on February 19, 2010. Delaware governor Jack Markell, concerned about failures in the medical, police, and legal communities that allowed Bradley's crimes to continue for more than a decade, has called for an independent review. Widener University Law School Dean Linda Ammons was appointed to head up that review.

Delaware Attorney General Beau Biden, son of then Vice President Joe Biden, announced in a January 2010 speech that he would not seek election to his father's former seat in the United States Senate because he felt it was more important to fully pursue Bradley's prosecution. Bradley's case was moved to New Castle County from Sussex County because of concerns about getting an impartial jury in Sussex County, as many families of his 127 alleged victims lived there. However, Bradley then waived his right to a jury trial, opting instead for a bench trial. The case was then moved back to Sussex County. After hearing evidence on June 7, 2011, Judge William C. Carpenter, the presiding Judge in Bradley's bench trial, stated he would issue his verdict at a later date.

On June 23, 2011, Bradley was convicted on all 24 counts on a consolidated indictment (which originally contained 529 counts): 14 counts of rape, seven counts of assault, and three counts of sexual exploitation of a child. On August 26, 2011, Judge Carpenter sentenced Bradley to the maximum sentence of 14 consecutive terms of life in prison plus a further 165 years in prison without parole. Under Delaware law, anyone convicted of raping three separate persons automatically receives life without parole. Judge Carpenter said that Bradley "betrayed his patients' trust and disgraced the medical profession", and that "you will never be in a position to harm a child again".

Bradley appealed to the Delaware Supreme Court, claiming that the original search warrant was not specific enough about where the evidence would be located, and that the police exceeded the limits of the warrant without probable cause. The Delaware Supreme Court unanimously affirmed Bradley's convictions on September 6, 2012.

The office complex housing his former practice was demolished on October 10, 2011. Earlier, state police confiscated the contents of Bradley's storage locker in Rehoboth Beach and destroyed them; the items were to be auctioned off to satisfy unpaid rent, but Biden intervened on behalf of the victims to buy them for a symbolic $1 so as not to take the chance of them ever being used again.

Bradley was held in the Special Housing Unit (SHU) of the James T. Vaughn Correctional Center in New Castle County until 2016, when Delaware authorities announced they would move him to an out-of-state prison because many of his victims and/or state residents otherwise affected by his actions either worked in or were incarcerated in Delaware prisons. Connecticut authorities revealed that Bradley was moved to the Cheshire Correctional Institution in Cheshire, Connecticut.

== See also ==
- Joël Le Scouarnec, French surgeon, child rapist, and paedophile.
- Jacques Leveugle, French teacher, sexual predator and pedophile
