= Joël Le Scouarnec =

French surgeon and child rapist (born 1950)

- Born: 3 December 1950 (age 75); Paris, France
- Occupation: Surgeon
- Spouse: Marie-France Lhermitte (m. 1974 div. 2023)
- Children: 3
- Convictions: Aggravated rape (111 counts); Rape (4 counts); Sexual assault (193 counts); Possessing child pornography (2 counts)
- Penalty: 20 years imprisonment

Details
- Victims: 299 (Note: Le Scouarnec was convicted of crimes against 299 victims; there were more victims whose cases did not reach court.)
- Span of crimes: 1989–2014
- Country: France
- Date apprehended: 2 May 2017

Joël Le Scouarnec (born 3 December 1950) is a French former surgeon, child rapist and paedophile. In May 2025 he was convicted of raping and sexually assaulting 299 victims, mostly child patients in a number of hospitals in western France, over a 25-year period from 1989 to 2014. Most of his victims were under the age of 15, with the youngest just one year old.

He had received a suspended sentence in 2005 for downloading child abuse images, but was allowed to continue his surgical practice. He was arrested in 2017 and sentenced in 2020 to 15 years' imprisonment for the rape and sexual assault of four children. The investigation into that case uncovered his journals, in which he had recorded his abuse of hundreds of patients. They were used to track down victims, some of whom learned for the first time that they had been raped or assaulted while under anaesthesia or sedation, and to bring further charges concerning 299 victims against him, in what was the largest child sexual abuse case in France.

The trial opened on 24 February 2025 in Vannes and lasted three months. Le Scouarnec, who admitted to all the charges, was convicted on 28 May 2025 and sentenced to the maximum 20 years in prison, to run concurrently with the 15 years he was already serving.

Victims and their lawyers condemned the public indifference to the case, with child abuse downplayed, compared with the global outrage at the multiple rape case of Gisèle Pelicot. Questions were also asked about the failure of medical authorities to take earlier action against Le Scouarnec.

== Early life, marriage and career ==
Le Scouarnec was born into modest circumstances in Paris on 3 December 1950, one of three children born to a carpenter father and a concierge mother. He studied medicine at Nantes University, graduating in 1981 and then specialised in gastrointestinal surgery. From 1983 to 1994 he worked at La Fontaine Hospital in Loches in the Indre-et-Loire department. From 1994 to 2004, he was employed by the Sacré-Cœur private hospital in Vannes, in the Morbihan department, Brittany, and also performed surgery at a number of other hospitals across the region. In 2004, he joined the public hospital in Lorient, also in Morbihan, and a year later moved to another public hospital in Quimperlé, in the department of Finistère, Brittany. In 2008, he was recruited by Jonzac hospital, in the Charente-Maritime department, and remained there until his retirement in 2017.

Le Scouarnec married Marie-France Lhermitte, a healthcare assistant, in 1974. The couple had three sons. Marie-France Le Scouarnec left her husband in 2005, but they did not divorce until 2023.

== 2005 conviction ==
On 17 November 2005, Le Scouarnec was convicted of downloading images of child sexual abuse. In 2004, an investigation by the FBI in the United States into global paedophilia had uncovered a Russian child abuse site on the dark web and found that Le Scouarnec, identified by his bank card, had used the site. The FBI alerted French authorities and Le Scouarnec's home was searched. Although nothing was found, Le Scouarnec admitted to viewing the material and he was charged. Upon conviction, he received a suspended four-month prison sentence and a fine. (Note: variously reported as 90 euros or 20,000 euros.) No restrictions were put on his medical practice and he was not ordered to undergo treatment.

== 2020 conviction ==
In April 2017, while Le Scouarnec was living alone in Jonzac, his neighbour's six-year-old daughter told her father that he had exposed himself to her and molested her through the garden fence. The matter was reported to police and Le Scouarnec was arrested and remanded into custody on 2 May 2017. An investigation uncovered sexual attacks dating back to the 1980s and 1990s on three other young children, two of them the nieces of Le Scouarnec and one of them a patient at the hospital in Loches. The trial took place in Saintes, Charente-Maritime from 30 November to 3 December 2020. Le Scouarnec was convicted of the rape and sexual assault of the four children and sentenced to fifteen years in prison.

Le Scouarnec's sister-in-law told a journalist that she once saw Le Scouarnec touch her five-year-old daughter in what appeared to be an inappropriate way, around the time he committed the crimes. She told her husband about it, but they did not report it to the police as they could not be certain that his actions were suspicious.

== 2025 conviction ==
After Le Scouarnec was arrested and detained in 2017, his property was searched and evidence found of more extensive criminal activity in the form of journals where he meticulously recorded instances of rape and sexual assault on hundreds of his patients, mostly children, over a period of 25 years. Police also found a collection of child-sized sex dolls and more than 300,000 images of child sex abuse.

Investigators were able to identify over 300 victims from Le Scouarnec's journals, where he had recorded their details and hospital records. He had raped, mostly by penetration with fingers, or sexually assaulted young patients while they were under anaesthetic or during medical examinations. Many of the victims had no recollection of the abuse and only learnt about it when they were contacted by police, having been identified in the journals. For some, the knowledge was a relief as it explained why they had suffered symptoms of trauma, while for others the knowledge was itself traumatising, especially as the journal entries contained graphic details of what had been done to them. Two men, who had some recollection of being abused by Le Scouarnec, took their own lives. Le Scouarnec began his journals in 1990 and continued up to 2016, writing between 40 and 100 entries a year. In multiple places he wrote that he was a paedophile.

In October 2020, Le Scouarnec, who was in prison awaiting his 2020 trial, was charged with the rape or assault of 312 patients, mostly minors. The number was later reduced to 299, 256 of whom were under the age of 15, with the youngest just one year old. There were 158 male and 141 female victims. By 2020, 349 victims had been identified but some were excluded due to the statute of limitations or insufficient evidence. On 24 February 2025 Le Scouarnec went on trial in the court at Vannes under presiding judge Aude Buresi, in what is believed to be the largest paedophilia case ever in France. More than sixty lawyers were involved in the trial. A former law school building near the court housed live-feed rooms for civil parties, the general public and more than 450 accredited journalists. Psychologists and support dogs were in attendance.

On the first day of the trial, Le Scouarnec, who had previously admitted to some of the charges, said that he had committed "despicable acts" and acknowledged that they had left his victims with indelible wounds. During the rest of the first week of the trial, evidence was heard from members of Le Scouarnec's family. His youngest son testified to growing up in a "normal family", but one in which things were left unsaid. Another son said he had been sexually abused by his grandfather, Le Scouarnec's father, between the ages of five and ten. He also thought that Le Scouarnec might have been abused by his father, in spite of Le Scouarnec's denials. Le Scouarnec's ex-wife said that she had no knowledge of her husband's paedophilia until his arrest in 2017; her testimony was received with disbelief. Confronted with an entry in Le Scouarnec's journal from the mid-1990s in which he said "Catastrophe has struck: she knows I am a paedophile", she suggested it was referring to his conscience and not to her. Le Scouarnec's brother told the court that he thought she must have known and did not speak out because Le Scouarnec's salary afforded her a comfortable lifestyle. On the fifth day of the trial, Le Scouarnec revealed that he had sexually abused the daughter of his eldest son.

At the beginning of March, the court heard from a number of Le Scouarnec's colleagues who said they were unaware of his paedophilia. Their testimony was given in such similar terms that one of the judges asked if they had collaborated over their statements. Later on, the trial heard from a small number of doctors who had had suspicions about Le Scouarnec, confronted him, alerted the authorities or refused to employ him.

Dozens of victims testified during the three-month trial, explaining the impact of Le Scouarnec's abuse on their lives. It was during the victims' testimony that, on 20 March, Le Scouarnec admitted that he was guilty of all the charges against him. Previously he had admitted to some charges, but in other cases had said he was simply carrying out medical examinations. He apologized to his victims, although claiming not to remember the acts, but his sincerity was questioned by victims' lawyers. On 21 May, he admitted to being responsible for the death of two victims who had taken their own lives.

On 23 May, the court heard the closing submissions of prosecutor Stephane Kellenberger. He demanded the maximum sentence of 20 years for Le Scouarnec and, in view of the serious risk of re-offending, called for him to be detained in a centre for treatment and supervision after release from prison. He said that a further trial would be likely as more victims came to light. "Should Joël Le Scouarnec have been alone in the dock?" he asked, with reference to the failure of the authorities to prevent the abuse. In their closing arguments, defence lawyers Maxime Tessier and Thibaut Kurzawa said that Le Scouarnec was prepared to accept the sentence demanded by the prosecution, but asked the court to take into account his admission of guilt and willingness to take responsibility for his actions. Given the opportunity to make a statement before the verdict, Le Scouarnec said that he was not asking for leniency, but wanted to be granted the right to become a better person.

On 28 May 2025, the court convicted Le Scouarnec of 299 counts of rape and sexual assault. He was sentenced to 20 years in prison, the maximum allowed by French law, to run concurrently with his existing sentence of 15 years. To the dismay of victims, the court rejected the prosecution's demand that he should be detained in a centre for supervision and treatment after completing his prison term.

== Failure of medical authorities ==
In a controversial move, the French Medical Council (Conseil de l'Ordre des Médecins), the regulatory body of French doctors, constituted itself as a civil party (French: partie civile) or complainant in the 2025 trial of Le Scouarnec, in order to try and establish how it was that he was able to commit so many crimes while practising as a surgeon. When he was convicted of downloading child abuse images in 2005, prosecutors did not alert the medical authorities and there were no consequences for his employment. In 2006, Thierry Bonvalot, a colleague at Quimperlé hospital, read about Le Scouarnec's criminal conviction in the local press and approached the hospital management. The director took the matter up with the regional medical authority, which voted that Le Scouarnec had not violated the medical code of ethics. In 2007, concerns about Le Scouarnec's fitness to practice were forwarded to the ministry of health (Le Ministère de la Santé et de l'Accès Aux Soins) after the death of a patient, but no action was taken. When Le Scouarnec was appointed to Jonzac hospital in 2008, he informed the director of his criminal conviction but again no action was taken. Frédéric Benoist, lawyer for the child protection association La Voix de l'Enfant, a civil party in the case, said that there had been "a chain of structural failures" and that the legal and medical authorities could "have stopped Le Scouarnec long before" if they had taken appropriate action.

== Lack of public interest ==
There has been criticism aimed at the apparent lack of interest in France in the 2025 Le Scouarnec case, compared to the massive worldwide outrage shown, particularly by women, to the multiple rapes of Gisèle Pelicot in France, a case which came to court in 2024. Myriam Guedj-Benayoun, a lawyer representing several of Le Scouarnec's victims, said "The issue is that this trial is about sexual abuse of children. There's a virtual omertà on this topic globally, but particularly in France. We simply don't want to acknowledge it". One of Le Scouarnec's victims said "They're trying to make him out to be a monster, but this monster is the society that created him and allowed him to continue".

== See also ==
- Earl Bradley, convicted serial child rapist in Pennsylvania, US
- Jacques Leveugle, French sexual predator and pedophile
