= Cheshire, Connecticut =

City in Connecticut, United States

- Town
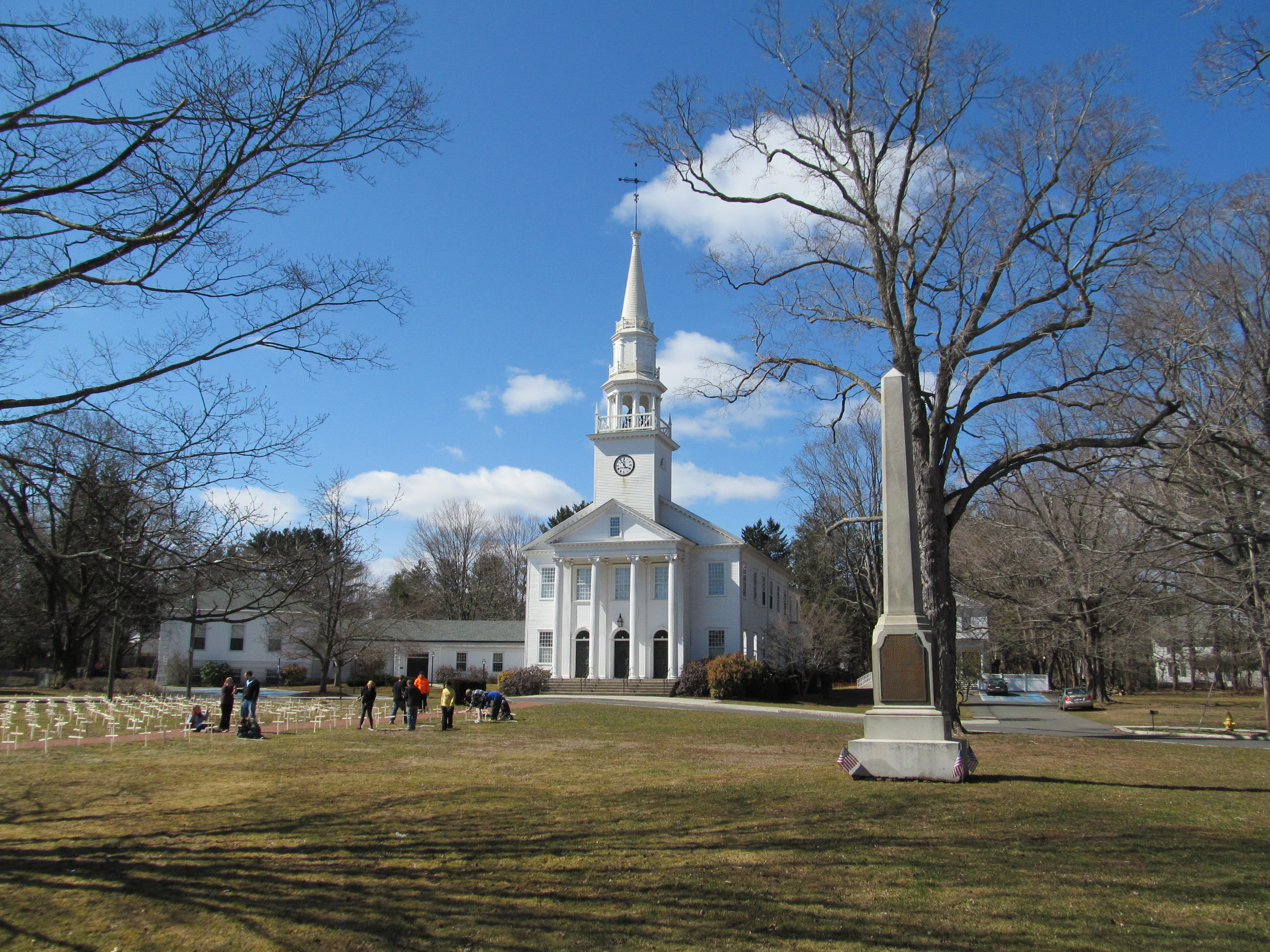
- First Congregational Church of Cheshire

- Flag Seal
- Nickname: The Bedding Plant Capital of Connecticut
- Interactive map of Cheshire, Connecticut
- Location within the state of Connecticut Location within the United States
- Coordinates: 41°30′44″N 72°54′13″W
- Country: United States
- U.S. state: Connecticut
- County: New Haven
- Region: Naugatuck Valley
- Settled: 1694
- Incorporated: 1780
- Named for: Cheshire, England

Government
  - Type: Council-manager
  - Town manager: Sean M. Kimball
  - Council: Members: Peter Talbot (D); Gregory Wolff (D); Deb Manke (D); A. Fiona Pearson (D); Louis Todisco (D); David Veleber, District 1 (R); Jim Jinks, District 2 (D); Don Walsh, District 3 (R); Tricia Cramer, District 4 (D)

Area
  - Total: 33.4 sq mi (86.4 km^{2})
  - Land: 33.1 sq mi (85.6 km^{2})
  - Water: 0.31 sq mi (0.8 km^{2})
- Elevation: 230 ft (70 m)

Population (2020)
  - Total: 28,733
  - Density: 869/sq mi (336/km^{2})
- Demonym: Cheshirite
- Time zone: UTC−5 (EST)
  - Summer (DST): UTC−4 (EDT)
- ZIP code: 06410
- Area codes: 203/475
- FIPS code: 09-14160
- GNIS feature ID: 0213406
- Website: cheshirect.gov

Cheshire (/ˈtʃɛʃər/ CHEH-shurr), is a town in New Haven County, Connecticut, United States. At the time of the 2020 census, the population of Cheshire was 28,733. The town is part of the Naugatuck Valley Planning Region. The center of population of Connecticut is located in Cheshire.

== History ==
Cheshire, Connecticut was first settled in 1694 as part of Wallingford. It was then known as New Cheshire Parish. After many attempts in securing their independence from Wallingford, New Cheshire Parish was granted secession and was later incorporated as a town in May 1780 as Cheshire. The name is a transfer from Cheshire, in England.

Prospect was formerly part of Cheshire before 1829, and was then known as Columbia Parish.

=== Preparedness shelter ===
Cheshire has a Cold War-era fallout shelter constructed in 1966, located underneath the local AT&T tower.

=== Cheshire home invasion and trial ===
During a July 23, 2007 home invasion in Cheshire (see Cheshire, Connecticut, home invasion murders), a mother and her two daughters were murdered, leaving the father of the family as the sole survivor. The incident and subsequent trial were covered extensively within local and state media and became culturally significant in Connecticut, having "upended notions of suburban security, delayed the abolition of Connecticut’s death penalty, and became the subject of TV shows, documentaries and books."

== Demographics ==
Historical population
Census	Pop.	Note	%±
1820	2,230		—
1850	1,626		—
1860	2,407		48.0%
1870	2,344		−2.6%
1880	2,284		−2.6%
1890	1,929		−15.5%
1900	1,989		3.1%
1910	2,560		28.7%
1920	2,855		11.5%
1930	3,263		14.3%
1940	4,352		33.4%
1950	6,295		44.6%
1960	13,383		112.6%
1970	19,051		42.4%
1980	21,788		14.4%
1990	25,684		17.9%
2000	28,543		11.1%
2010	29,261		2.5%
2020	28,733		−1.8%
2021 (est.)	28,628		−0.4%

As of the census of 2020, there were 28,733 people, 10,169 households, and 7,562 families residing in the town. The population density was 860 inhabitants per square mile (330/km^{2}). There were 10,401 housing units at an average density of 291.4 per square mile (112.5/km^{2}). The racial makeup of the town was 81.07% White, 4.40% African American, 0.07% Native American, 6.24% Asian, 0.01% Pacific Islander, 2.70% from other races, and 5.50% from two or more races. Hispanic or Latino of any race were 6.33% of the population. The largest ethnic groups in the town are Italian Americans and Irish Americans.

There were 10,169 households, out of which 23.7% had children under the age of 18 living with them, 64.8% were married couples living together, 19.2% had a female householder with no husband present, and 25.64% were non-families. 21.39% of all households were made up of individuals, and 9.4% had someone living alone who was 65 years of age or older. The average household size was 2.62 and the average family size was 3.04.

In the town, the population was spread out, with 19.4% under the age of 18, 5.9% from 20 to 24, 20.1% from 25 to 44, 33.5% from 45 to 64, and 18.6% who were 65 years of age or older. The median age was 46.2 years. For every 100 females, there were 113.9 males. For every 100 females age 18 and over, there were 110.3 males.

In 2019, the median household income was $120,546 and the per capita income was $52,013. About 1.6% of families and 3.0% of the population were below the poverty line, including 3.1% of those under age 18 and 4.3% of those age 65 or over.

The central area of the town is a census-designated place identified as Cheshire Village. As of the 2020 census, Cheshire Village had a population of 6,499.

== Geography ==
=== Environment ===
According to the United States Census Bureau, the town has a total area of 33.4 square miles (86.4 km^{2}), of which 33.1 square miles (85.6 km^{2}) is land and 0.31 square miles (0.8 km^{2}), or 0.89%, is water.

Cheshire is situated in the midst of several major cities of Connecticut. It lies 14 miles (23 km) north of New Haven, 25 miles (40 km) south of the capital Hartford, 30 miles (48 km) northeast of Bridgeport, and Waterbury is adjacent to Cheshire. Cheshire shares borders with Southington on the north and northeast, Meriden on the northeast, Wallingford on the east, Hamden on the south, Bethany for a short distance on the southwest, Prospect on the west, Waterbury on the northwest, and Wolcott on the northwest

=== Climate ===
Climate data for Cheshire, Connecticut
Month	Jan	Feb	Mar	Apr	May	Jun	Jul	Aug	Sep	Oct	Nov	Dec	Year
Mean daily maximum °F (°C)	35 (2)	39 (4)	47 (8)	59 (15)	70 (21)	78 (26)	83 (28)	81 (27)	74 (23)	63 (17)	52 (11)	41 (5)	60 (16)
Mean daily minimum °F (°C)	15 (−9)	18 (−8)	26 (−3)	36 (2)	46 (8)	56 (13)	61 (16)	59 (15)	51 (11)	39 (4)	31 (−1)	22 (−6)	38 (4)
Average precipitation inches (mm)	4.64 (118)	3.61 (92)	4.38 (111)	5.52 (140)	4.64 (118)	4.74 (120)	4.59 (117)	4.78 (121)	4.84 (123)	4.18 (106)	4.41 (112)	4.24 (108)	54.57 (1,386)

== Politics ==
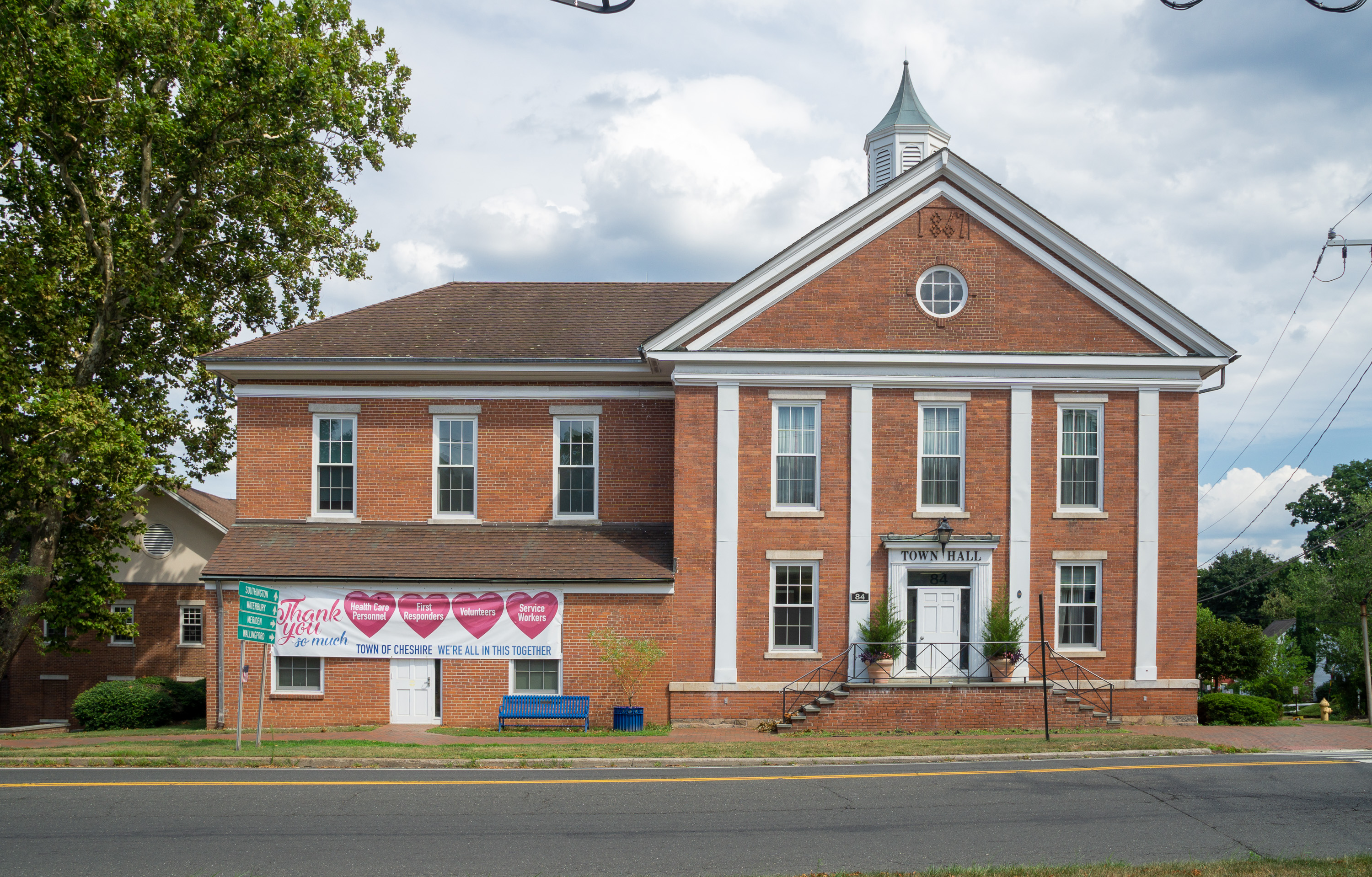
Cheshire Town Hall

Cheshire's voters have split tickets frequently in recent statewide elections. In 2004, President Bush won a narrow plurality over John Kerry. Bush had lost the town in his 2000 bid. In 2006 Cheshire voters gave strong support to Republican governor M. Jodi Rell, independent U.S. Senate candidate Joe Lieberman and local Democratic House candidate Chris Murphy, who defeated incumbent Nancy Johnson. In the 2008 presidential election, the town's voters supported Democrat Barack Obama with 8,177 votes over Republican John McCain with 6,839 votes. Voting tallies for the 2016 presidential election are as follows: Hillary Clinton (D) 7,572, Donald Trump (R) 7,105, Gary Johnson (L) 538, and Jill Stein (G) 189.

Cheshire voted for Republican majorities to its board of selectmen every election from 1915 to 1971, and then to its town council every year from 1973 to 2001, when voters elected a Democratic majority (6–3) for the first time. In 2003, a Republican majority (5–4) was elected. A Democratic majority (5–4) was elected in 2005, then reelected (5–4) in 2007. In the 2009 local elections, Cheshire voters ousted the Democratic majority on the town council and elected 8 Republicans and 1 Democrat, though due to local minority representation rules, only 7 Republicans were seated.

Presidential Election Results
Year	Democratic	Republican	Third Parties
2024	54.9% 9,930	43.5% 7,498	2.0% 345
2020	55.6% 9,745	42.2% 7,349	2.2% 324
2016	49.2% 7,572	46.1% 7,105	4.7% 727
2012	49.7% 7,397	49.1% 7,311	1.2% 186
2008	53.9% 8,177	45.1% 6,839	1.0% 146
2004	48.4% 7,283	50.4% 7,583	1.2% 179
2000	49.1% 6,977	45.8% 6,507	5.1% 672
1996	47.1% 6,227	41.8% 5,536	11.1% 1,450
1992	35.0% 5,096	44.5% 6,484	20.5% 2,976
1988	37.7% 4,700	61.6% 7,682	0.7% 94
1984	29.6% 3,444	70.0% 8,157	0.4% 45
1980	27.1% 3,038	58.3% 6,541	14.6% 1,632
1976	35.5% 3,606	64.0% 6,509	0.5% 45
1972	27.7% 2,649	71.3% 6,811	1.0% 94
1968	34.5% 2,682	59.9% 4,665	5.6% 432
1964	51.2% 3,470	48.8% 3,305	0.00% 0
1960	36.2% 2,269	63.8% 4,001	0.00% 0
1956	20.3% 1,008	79.7% 3,962	0.00% 0

== Arts and culture ==
=== Museums and other points of interest ===
The Barker Character, Comic and Cartoon Museum, located in the northern section of Cheshire, holds a large collection of memorabilia, novelties and ephemera such as lunch boxes and Pez dispensers bearing the likenesses of characters from television, cartoons and comics.

=== National Register of Historic Places ===
- Cheshire Historic District — Roughly bounded by Main Street, Highland Avenue, Wallingford Road, South Main, Cornwall, and Spring streets (added September 29, 1986)
- Farmington Canal Lock (Lock 12) — 487 North Brooksvale Road (added March 16, 1973)
- First Congregational Church of Cheshire — 111 Church Drive (added March 16, 1973)
- Marion Historic District (added December 21, 1988)
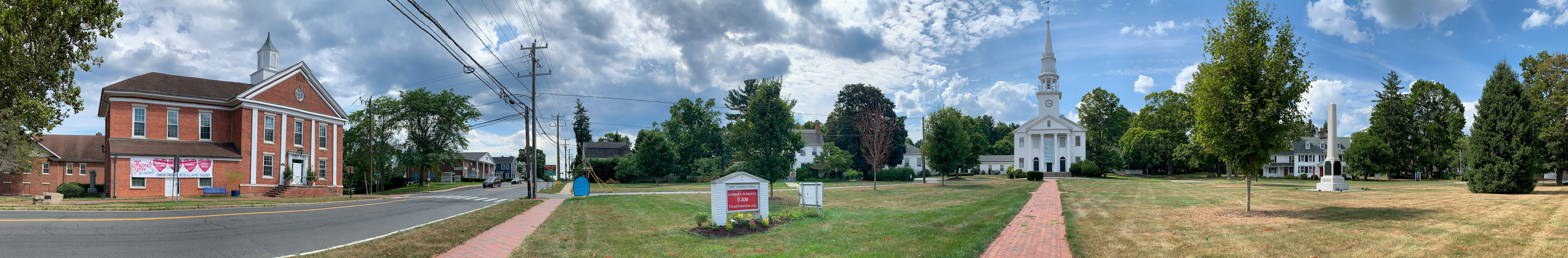
Left to right: Cheshire Town Hall, Congregational Church, Historical Society, and Civil War Memorial.

== Parks and recreation ==
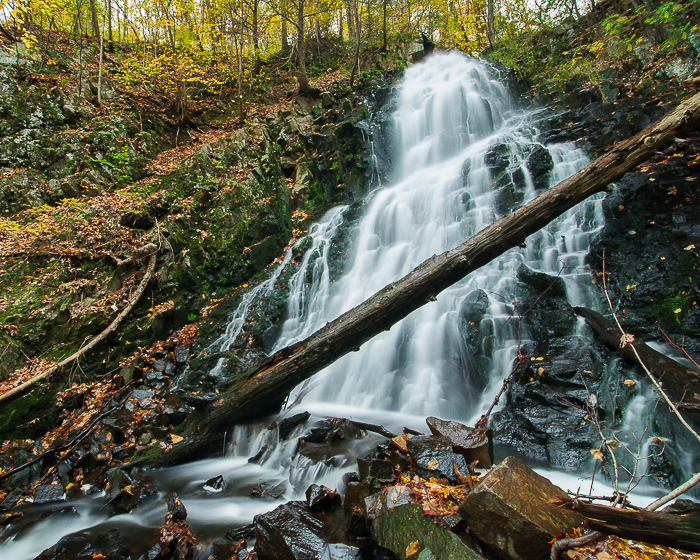
Roaring Brook Falls seen in late October after substantial rainfall

The Farmington Canal Heritage Trail, a popular non-motorized recreational trail, runs through Cheshire along its route between Suffield, Connecticut, to the north and New Haven, Connecticut, to the south.

The Hitchcock-Phillips House, a historic home, is located in town.

Roaring Brook Falls along the Quinnipiac Trail in the southwest corner of town is Connecticut's tallest single drop waterfall, and is owned by the Cheshire Land Trust.

Community parks and recreational facilities in town include:

- Cheshire Park, a 75-acre park geared towards active recreation
- Bartlem Recreational Area, a park with a playscape, skate park and picnic area.
- Mixville Recreation Area, offering winter sledding, swimming, and fishing at Mixville Pond
- Cheshire Community Pool, a swimming facility which was renovated in 2016 to offer a year-round, indoor pool.

== Education ==
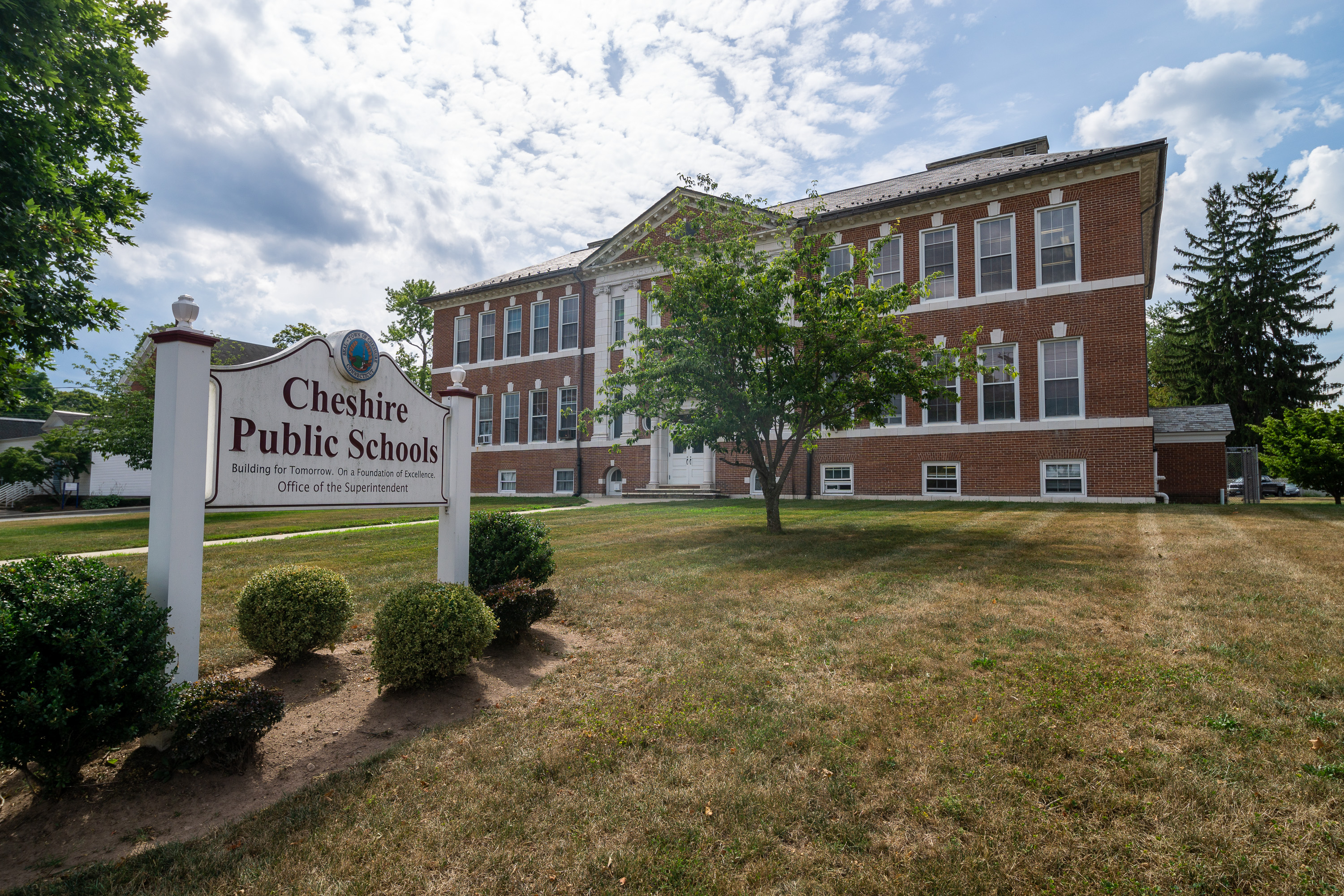
Cheshire School Administration building

Cheshire is home to one public high school, Cheshire High School, and one public middle school, Dodd Middle School. There are four public elementary schools: Chapman, Doolittle, Highland, and Barnum Elementary. Norton and Chapman Elementary Schools were closed and rebuilt, while Darcy remains closed.

There are also several private and alternative schools in the town, including Cheshire Academy (originally the Episcopal Academy of Connecticut), which was founded in Cheshire in 1794 and currently educates students in the Upper School (grades 9–12/Post-Graduate Year). St. Bridgets is a Catholic school in Cheshire for grades preschool to 8th grade. Humiston is an alternative high school in Cheshire.

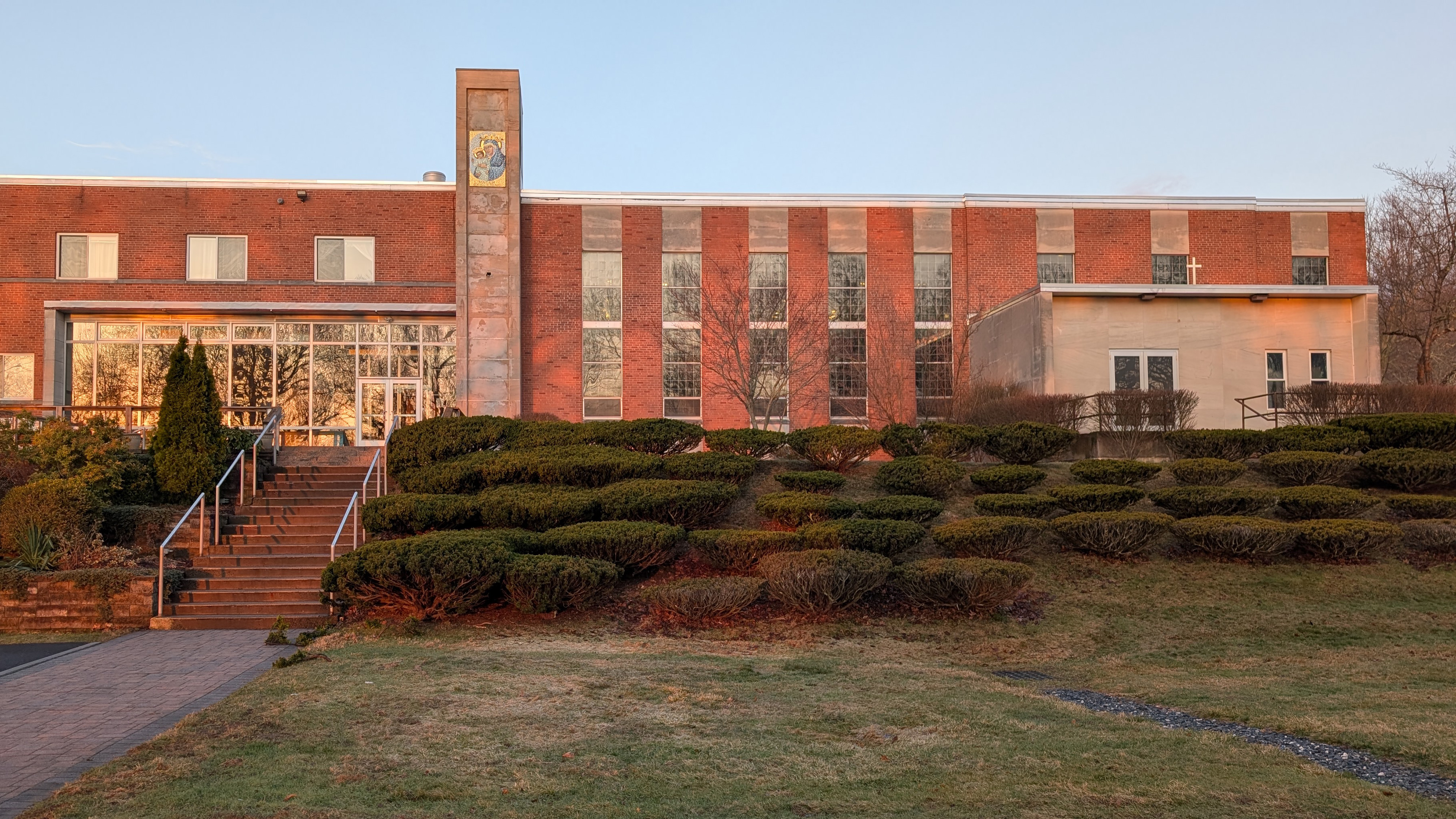
Front of the Novitiate and College of Humanities of the Legionaries of Christ

The Legion of Christ, a Roman Catholic congregation, runs their novitiate and college of humanities on a 200-acre (0.81 km^{2}) complex on Oak Avenue. About 100 seminarians undergo two to four years of training for the priesthood there, including religious formation and classical humanities.

== Transportation ==
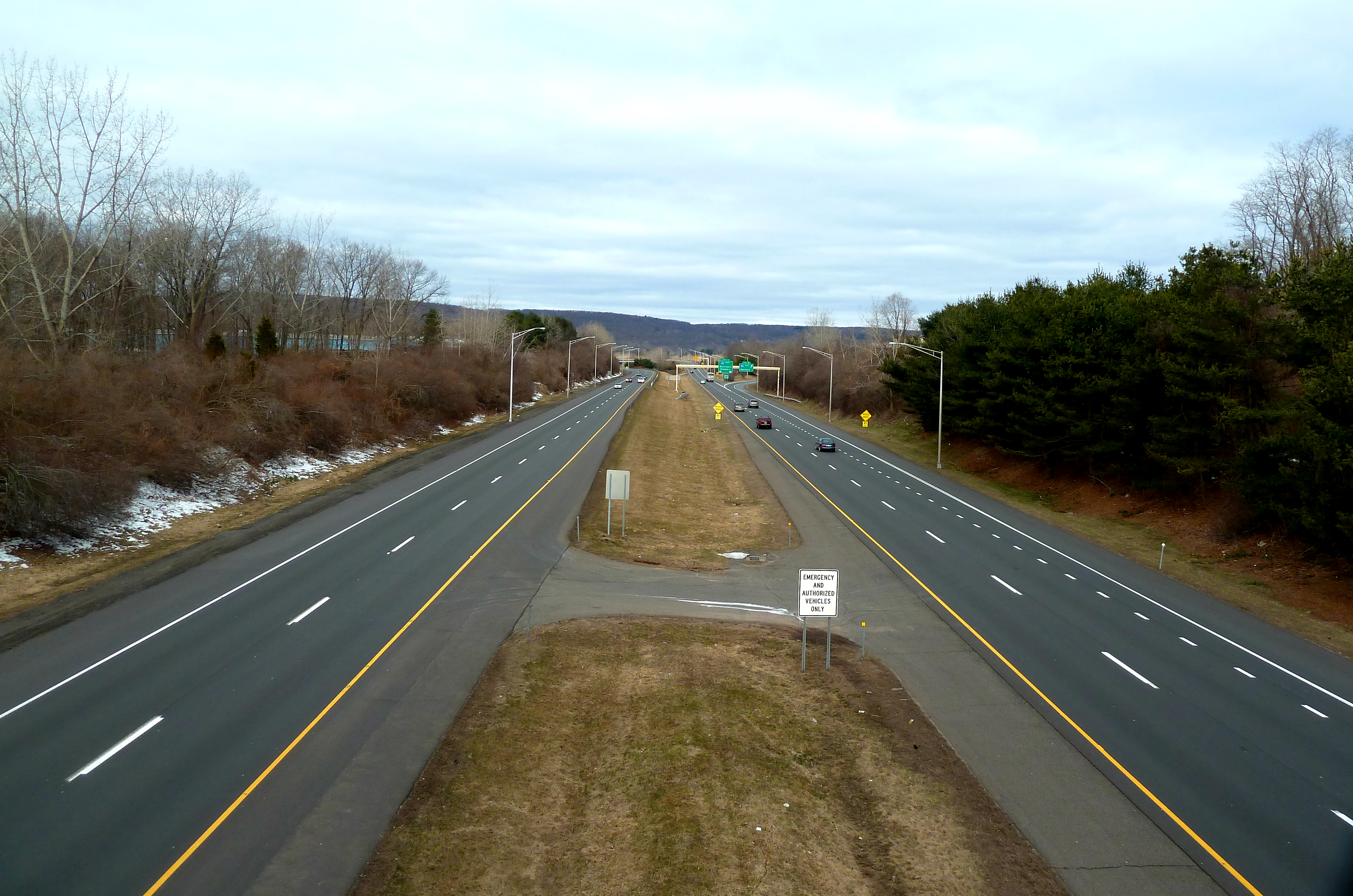
I-691 in Cheshire.

Transportation within Cheshire is largely by car. Interstate 691 skirts the northern edge of the town. Interstate 84 passes through the northwest part of the town. The main north–south artery is Route 10, a difficult passage that is busy, sometimes congested, and includes many stoplights. There are two east–west routes: Route 42 and Route 68/Route 70. Route 10 is by far the busiest road in Cheshire, with the worst Route 10 traffic occurring between Routes 68/70 and Route 42 every weekday during the morning commute, evening commute, and after the high school gets out at 2 pm. West Main Street and Main Street, Route 68/70 between Route 10 and Waterbury Road, is the next busiest road in town. The intersection of Route 10 and Route 68/70 is the busiest intersection in town. The second busiest intersection is the Cheshire High School and Route 10 intersection right before school starts and right after school ends.

The 229 line of Connecticut Transit New Haven which runs from Waterbury to New Haven travels through Cheshire on Routes 70 and 10. A commuter express bus also runs from the commuter lot near Interstate 84 to Hartford.

== Economy ==
Top employers in Cheshire according to the town's 2024 Comprehensive Annual Financial Report

#	Employer	# of Employees
1	Bozzuto's Inc	1,254
2	Connecticut Department of Correction	1,041
3	Town of Cheshire	966
4	Macy's Logistics	622
5	Collins Aerospace	330
6	Whole Foods	320
7	Hanwha Aerospace	265
8	Omnicare	220
9	Elm Park Baptist Home	207
10	Eversource	176

Cheshire is home to two large state prison facilities located in the northern section of town. The larger of these facilities is the Cheshire Correctional Institution, which opened in 1913. In 1982, the Manson Youth Institution opened adjacent to the CCI. These prisons explain the city's skewed male/female ratios. The larger of these prisons is located across the street from Chapman Elementary School, separated by Route 10.

== Notable people ==
- Amos Bronson Alcott (1799–1888), schoolmaster
- Brad Ausmus, professional baseball player and MLB manager
- Harvey C. Barnum, Jr., Medal of Honor recipient
- Henry Washington Benham (1813–1884), Union army general
- Chris Berman, ESPN sportscaster
- Jay Bontatibus, actor
- Albert E. Burke (1919–1999), professor and pioneer of educational television
- Sabrina Cass, Olympic skier
- John Chamberlain (1903–1995), journalist
- Michael Chasen, co-founder and CEO of ClassEDU and co-founder of Blackboard Inc.
- Sean Clements, podcaster, producer. Famous for "Santaman" character
- Martha Coolidge, film director
- Dorothy Cox (1892-1977), (archaeologist)
- Amos Doolittle (1754–1832), engraver of Battle of Concord scenes
- Eliakim Doolittle (1772–1850), composer
- George Henry Durrie, painter
- Elizabeth Esty, U.S. congresswoman
- Samuel A. Foot (1780–1846), 28th governor of Connecticut, United States representative and United States senator
- Lucinda Foote (1772–1834), student who applied to Yale College
- Seabury Ford (1801–1855), 20th governor of Ohio
- Matt Generous, ice hockey defenseman
- James J. Greco, businessman, lived in town from 1992 to 2011
- Sunil Gulati, President of the United States Soccer Federation
- Peter Hitchcock (1781–1854), judge
- John Holmstrom, cartoonist, writer
- Alan Hoskins, CEO of Energizer
- Adam Kaloustian, television producer
- John Frederick Kensett (1816–1872), painter
- Brian Leetch, ice hockey defenseman and Hockey Hall of Fame inductee
- Rollin Carolas Mallary, U.S. representative from Vermont
- Legs McNeil, journalist, rock music historian
- J. P. Morgan, businessman
- Anjul Nigam, actor
- Marc Tyler Nobleman, author
- Ron Palillo, actor
- Paul Pasqualoni, athletic coach
- Molly Qerim, television show host
- Lonnie Quinn, meteorologist
- Ray Reckmack, American football player
- Ramamurti Shankar physicist
- Edward Tufte, professor
- Justin Tussing, novelist
- Vijay Vaitheeswaran, journalist
- James Van Der Beek (1977–2026), actor
- Matthew Berry, sports writer
