= Albert Burke =

Albert Burke may refer to:

- Albert E. Burke (1919–1999), Yale University professor and public educational television pioneer
- Albert Burke (tennis) (1901–1958), Irish tennis player
