= Cheshire High School =

Location
- 525 South Main Street; Cheshire, Connecticut 06410; United States
- Coordinates: 41°29′24″N 72°54′25″W

Information
- Type: Public
- School district: Cheshire Public Schools
- Superintendent: Jeff Solan
- CEEB code: 070095
- Principal: Mary Gadd
- Teaching staff: 104.54 (FTE)
- Grades: 9 to 12
- Gender: Co-ed
- Enrollment: 1,208 (2024-2025)
- Student to teacher ratio: 11.56
- Colors: Red and white
- Athletics conference: Southern Connecticut Conference
- Mascot: Ramsey the Ram
- Newspaper: The Rampage
- Website: www.cheshire.k12.ct.us/schools/cheshire-high-school

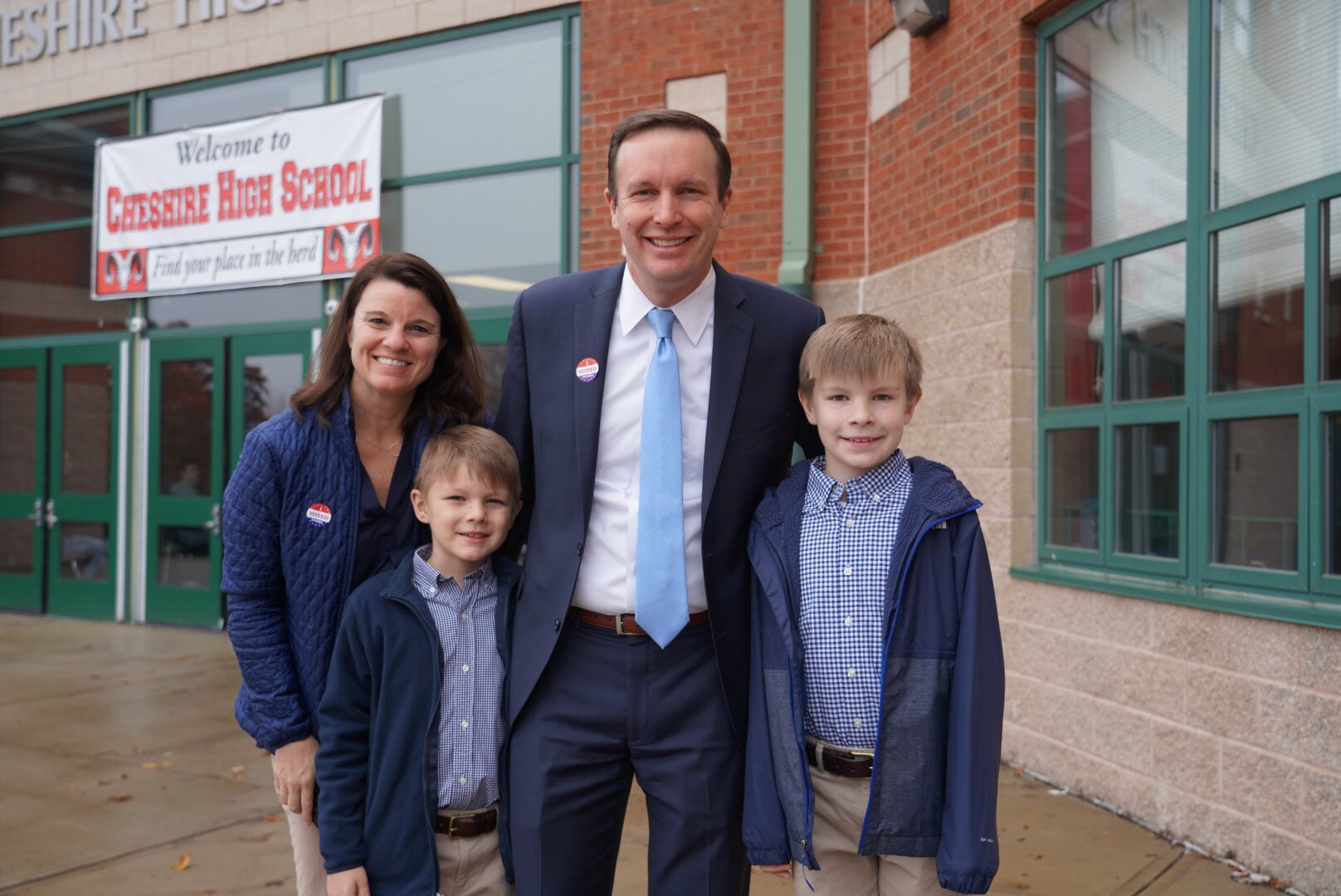
Senator Chris Murphy on election day, 2018. Cheshire High School is a polling place.

Cheshire High School is a comprehensive public high school serving approximately 1,538 students; it is the sole comprehensive high school of Cheshire Public Schools.

Located at 525 South Main Street in Cheshire, Connecticut, Cheshire High School is 15 miles (24 km) north of New Haven and 25 miles (40 km) south of Hartford. It is the town's sole public high school.

As of 2016, Cheshire High School has approximately 1,538 students, 104 faculty members, six guidance counselors, three assistant principals, and one principal. The school is accredited by the New England Association of Secondary Schools and Colleges.

== Renovations ==
The last renovations to Cheshire High School were completed during the summer of 2000. Prior to this, the school was last renovated in 1971. Designed by DeCarlo & Doll, Inc. and built by Trataros Construction, Inc., the renovations added 73,400 square feet (6,820 m^{2}) of space at a cost of over eight million dollars.

The renovation brought to the school a new two-story wing of about 51,000 square feet (4,700 m^{2}), containing:

- Thirteen classrooms, which now primarily house math and foreign language classes
- Two computer labs
- A common area, which primarily serves as a cafeteria
- Administrative and guidance offices

A new band room was also built in the rear of the building. Additionally, three science classrooms were renovated, faculty parking lots were created, and landscaping work was done in the front of school, around the new wing. As this new addition faced the main road, it became the new facade and main entrance to the school. Previously, the main entrance was tucked away at the south side of the building.

In 2011, the Technology Department received a $73,000 grant to improve its video studio. Cheshire High School offers multiple media-based classes which use the studio, including video production and news media production. Graduates had been excelling at media colleges for years prior to the renovation and now are doing so to a greater extent.

== Athletics ==
Cheshire High School participates in the Southern Connecticut Conference.

=== Baseball ===
The Rams baseball team won the class LL state championship in 2018.

=== Softball ===
The Rams softball team won their first class LL state championship in 2016 during their first ever unbeaten season finishing 27-0.

=== List of Championship Wins ===
CIAC State Championship Wins
Sport	Class	Year(s)
Baseball	L	1984
Baseball	LL	1992, 1993, 2018
Cross country (boys)	M	1969
Cross country (girls)	L	1994, 1996
Field hockey	M	1978, 1981
Field hockey	L	1987, 1989, 1991 (Co-Champions with Guilford), 1996 (Co-Champions with Simsbury), 2000, 2001, 2011
Football	L	1992, 1993, 1994, 1995
Football	LL	1996, 1997, 2009
Golf (boys)	I	1999
Golf (boys)	Spring-I	2023
Ice Hockey (boys)	III	2006
Ice Hockey (boys)	II	2009, 2011, 2024
Ice Hockey (boys)	I	1978
Lacrosse (boys)	I	2002
Lacrosse (boys)	M	2023
Lacrosse (boys)	L	2010, 2024
Soccer (boys)	L	2022
Soccer (boys)	LL	1988
Soccer (girls)	LL	2003, 2005 (Co-Champions with Simsbury)
Softball	LL	2016
Swimming (boys)	M	1977, 1978, 1982
Swimming (boys)	L	1979, 1983, 1984, 1985, 1989, 1995, 1996, 1997, 1998, 2000, 2001, 2002, 2005, 2006
Swimming (boys)	LL	1992
Swimming (boys)	Open	1992
Swimming (girls)	M	1982, 1983, 1984, 1985, 1986, 1995
Swimming (girls)	L	1978, 1979, 1987, 1988, 1989, 1990, 1991, 1992, 1993, 1994, 1996, 1997, 1998, 1999, 2000, 2001, 2002, 2003, 2017, 2018
Swimming (girls)	LL	2004, 2009, 2019
Swimming (girls)	Open	1987, 1988, 1990, 1991, 1992, 1993, 1995, 1996, 1997, 1998, 1999, 2003, 2004, 2019
Tennis (boys)	L	1995 (Co-Champions with Simsbury), 1996, 1997, 2002
Tennis (boys)	LL	1998
Tennis (girls)	Open (singles)	2024
Track and field (indoor, girls)	L	1999, 2000
Volleyball (boys)	L	2011, 2012
Volleyball (girls)	M	1974, 1976, 1977
Volleyball (girls)	L	1997, 1998
Volleyball (girls)	LL	2007, 2013

== Arts ==
The Ram Band marched in parades such as the 43rd Presidential Inaugural Parade, the 1999 Tournament of Roses Parade, and the 2000 Macy's Thanksgiving Day Parade.

Year	Achievements
1999	2nd Place USSBA Group 5-Open
2002	2nd Place USSBA Group 5-Open
2004	2nd Place USSBA Group 5-Open
2005	1st place USSBA Group 5-Open
2006	1st Place USSBA Group 5-Open
2007	3rd Place USSBA Group 5-Open
2008	2nd Place USSBA Group 5-Open
2009	1st USSBA Northern States Group 3-Open
2014	5th US Bands Group 4-Open
2016	5th US Bands Group 5-Open
2017	5th US Bands Group 5-Open

Cheshire's Winter Percussion Ensemble won first place two years in a row (2008–09) at MAC Championships. They also won USSBA National Championships in the AAA category in 2011.

== Notable alumni ==
- Brad Ausmus, Major League Baseball All-Star catcher and manager
- Harvey C. Barnum Jr., colonel in the United States Marine Corps and Medal of Honor recipient
- Sabrina Cass, Olympic skier
- Michael Chasen, co-founder and CEO of ClassEDU and co-founder of Blackboard Inc.
- Sean Clements, television writer, producer, comedian, actor, and host of Hollywood Handbook
- Sunil Gulati, president of the United States Soccer Federation; economics faculty member at Columbia University
- Alan Hoskins, CEO of Energizer
- Adam Kaloustian, television producer
- Brian Leetch, professional hockey player
- Legs McNeil, journalist and co-founder of PUNK
- Anjul Nigam, actor
- Marc Tyler Nobleman, author
- Ron Palillo, actor
- Paul Pasqualoni, head coach of the University of Connecticut football team
- Molly Qerim, American television personality, television show host
- Lonnie Quinn, actor and weather presenter
