= Dodd Middle School =

Dodd Middle School may refer to:

- Dodd Middle School in Cheshire, Connecticut - Cheshire Public Schools
- John W. Dodd Middle School in Freeport, New York - Freeport Public Schools
