= Novitiate and College of Humanities of the Legionaries of Christ =

Catholic novitiate and college in Connecticut

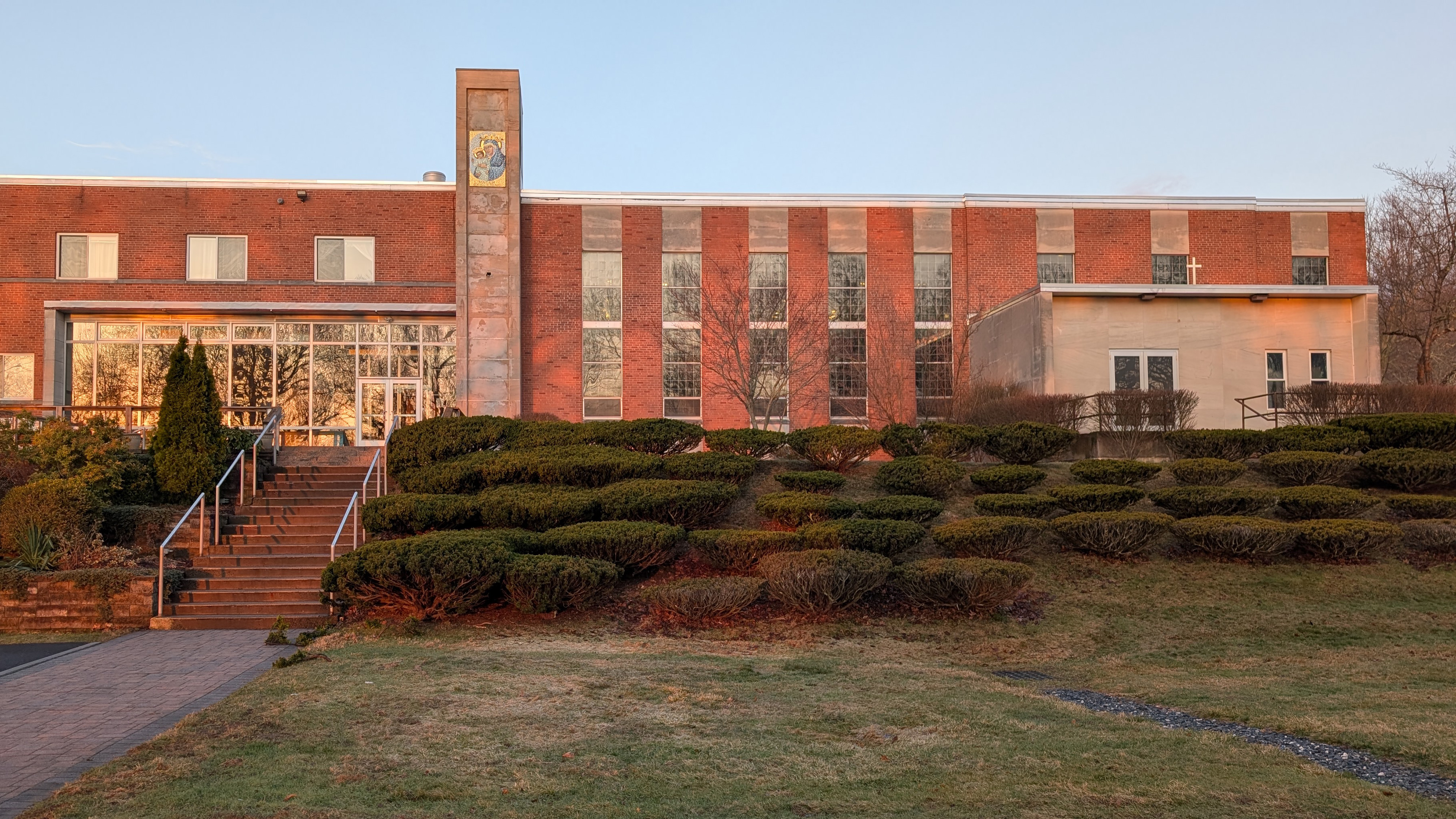
- Front of the College
- Motto: Christus vita vestra
- Motto in English: Christ Is Your Life
- Type: Novitiate, AA in Religious Studies and Humanities
- Established: 1965 (current location 1982)
- Accreditation: State of Connecticut
- Religious affiliation: Legion of Christ, Roman Catholic
- Rector: Fr. Timothy Walsh, LC
- Dean: Fr. Miguel de la Torre, LC
- Location: 475 Oak Avenue, Cheshire, Connecticut, 06410, USA; 41°30′44″N 72°54′13″W
- Colors: Red and White
- Website: www.lccollege.org

The Novitiate and College of Humanities of the Legionaries of Christ in Cheshire, Connecticut, is a formation house dedicated to forming priests for the Congregation. New members of the Legion of Christ who are assigned to the North-American Territory spend their first fours years here after joining as their first stage of training for religious life and priestly ministry, before studying philosophy and theology in Rome. The formation time in Cheshire is divided into a two-year Novitiate and two years of Humanities. After the second year of Humanities, an Associate of Arts Degree is offered. The college is accredited by the State of Connecticut. As of 2018, there are about 20 novices and 70 professed religious studying at the college.

== History ==
The building was constructed in 1961 by the Missionaries of La Salette as a minor seminary. The Legion of Christ acquired the property in 1982 and moved the novitiate from a much smaller house in Orange, Connecticut. In 1991, the program of humanities was begun and a new wing was added to house the professed seminarians.

The novitiate began in the US in a home in Woodmont, Connecticut in 1965. In 1971, it was moved to Orange before receiving its current location in Cheshire.

As of 2017, all professed novices of the Legion of Christ worldwide who study humanities are doing so in Cheshire.

== Novitiate ==
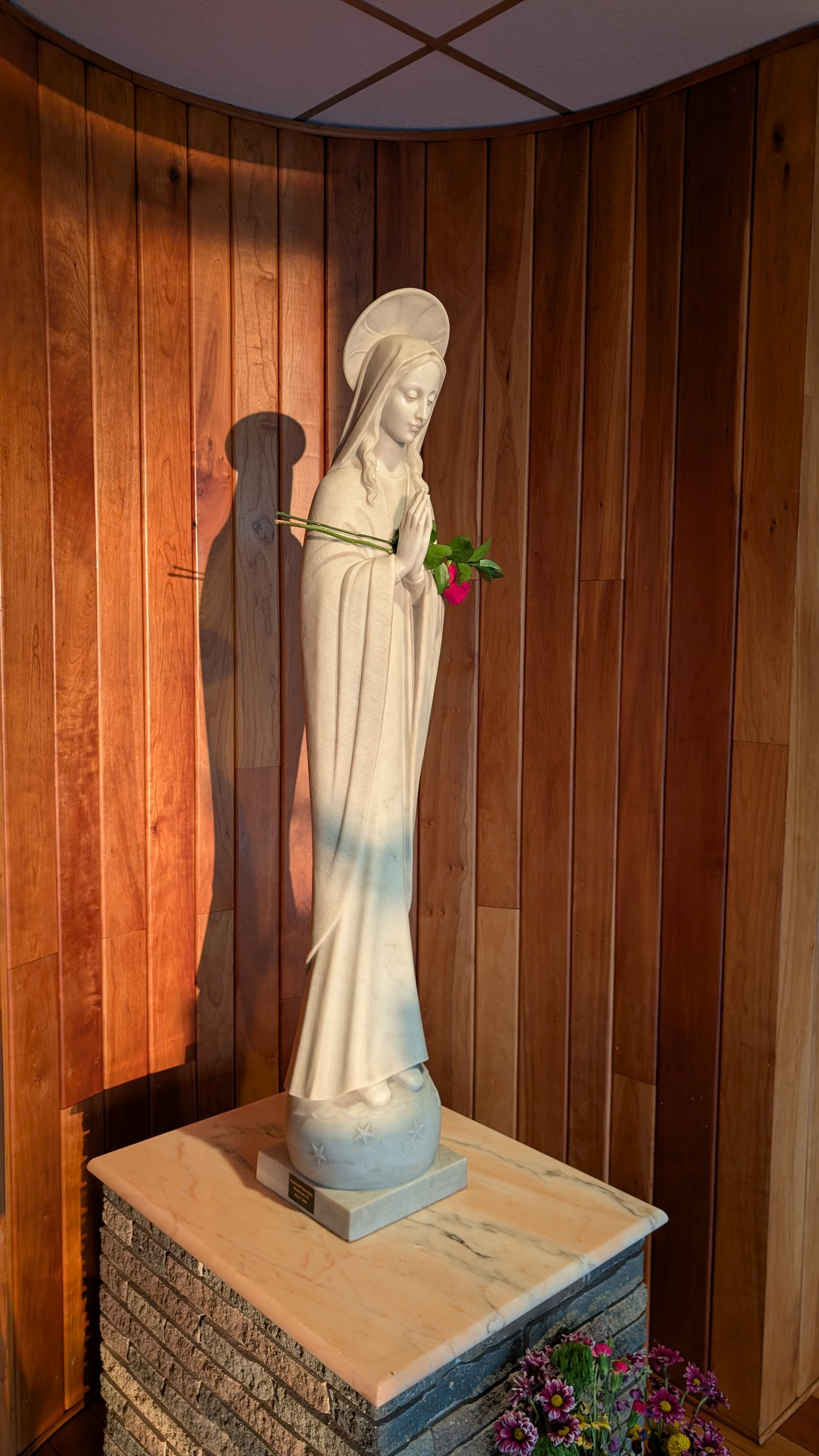
A statue of the Mary in the seminary lobby

Legionaries consider the Novitiate the university where one studies Christ. The novitiate is geared towards the profession of the religious vows at the end of the two years. Each novice must discern if God is calling him to be a lifelong member of the Legion of Christ and a priest.

The schedule of the novitiate focuses on prayer and learning the spirit of the congregation. They have daily Mass, rosary, adoration, and spiritual reading. They also have weekly spiritual direction and regular spiritual conferences.

Once a year, the novices dedicate a month of their summer to manual labor or, alternatively, charitable work. By such work, they come into contact with the struggles of others who fight to put food on the table.

== College of Humanities ==
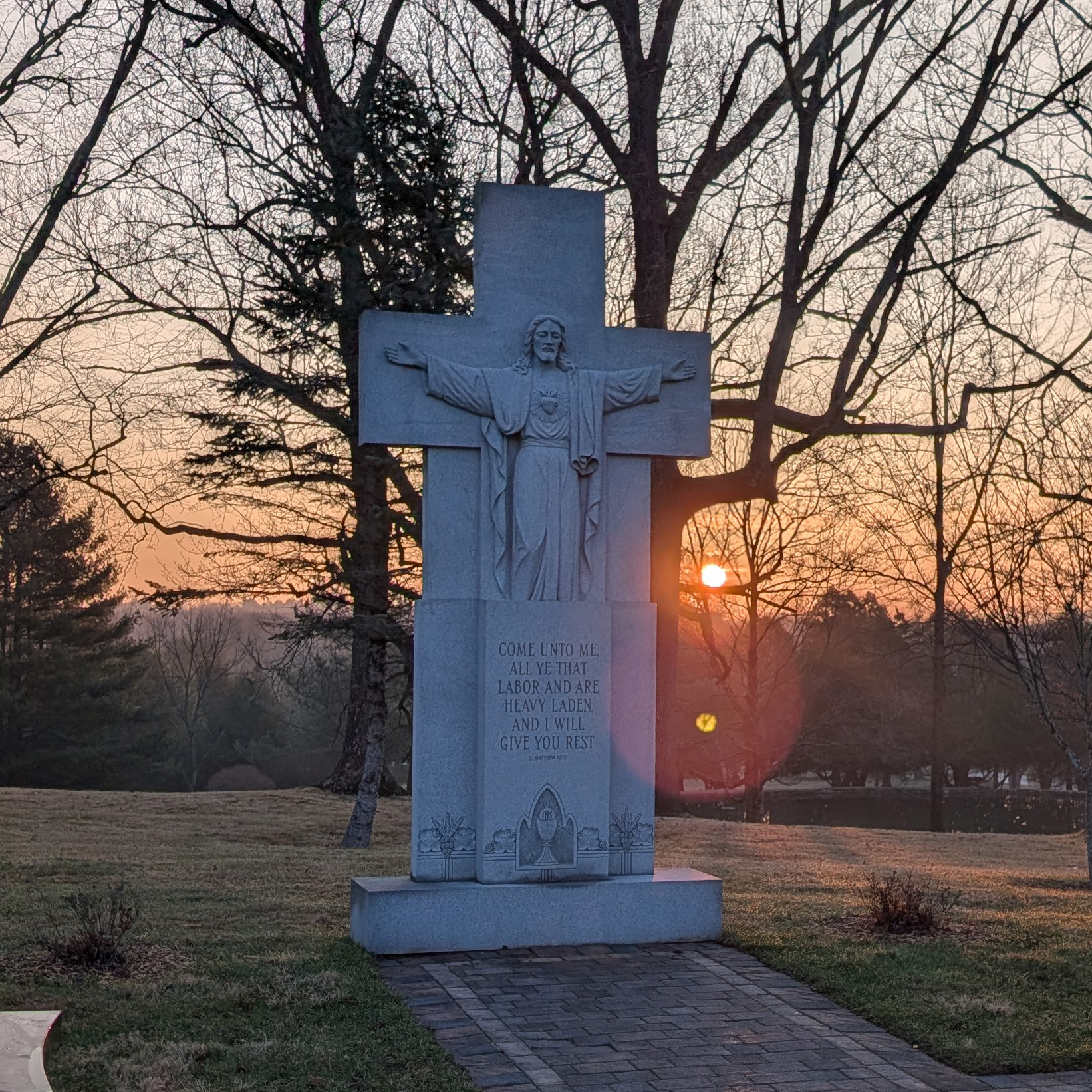
The statue of the Sacred Heart in front of the seminary

At their College of Humanities, the members of the Legion of Christ undertake studies in humanities (Western Civilization, Literature, Art and Music Theory and History), oral and written communication, foreign languages (Latin, Greek, and Spanish), Mathematics, Physics, and Biology for Bioethics.

Each year, the humanities students do a week of work with similar goals as the novices month of work.
