= Lucinda Foote =

18th century American scholar

Lucinda Foote was an American student who applied to study at Yale College (now part of Yale University) in 1783, some 186 years prior to women being admitted. Consequently her application was rejected, despite meeting the entrance standards. Her name was later used by protesters supporting the admission of women to the University in 1963.

== Biography ==
In 1783, female student Lucinda Foote undertook the entrance exams for Yale College (now University), at the age of 12 years old. Based on the results of the exams, in both Latin and Greek, she met the required standard to study at the university. However, she was rejected on the basis of her gender by the President of the University, Ezra Stiles.

Stiles wrote of Foote's application:

Let it be known unto you, that I have tested Miss Lucinda Foote, aged 12, by way of examination, proving that she has made laudable progress in the languages of the learned, viz, the Latin and the Greek; to such an extent that I found her translating and expounding with perfick (sic) ease, both words and sentences in the whole of Vergil's Aeneid, in selected orations of Cicero, and in the Greek testament. I testify that were it not for her sex, she would be considered fit to be admitted as a student of Yale.

== Legacy ==
When the subject of the admission of women to Yale University was raised in 1963, the student demonstrators referred to themselves as the Lucinda Foote Committee. When the prospect of naming two new colleges within the University arose in 2014, history professor Jay Gitlin suggested naming them after Foote or Grace Hopper.
