= Paul Pasqualoni =

American football player and coach (born 1949)

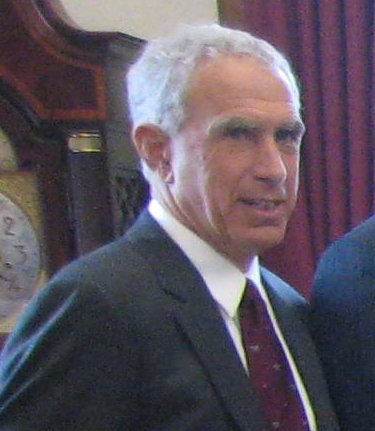
- Pasqualoni visits the Connecticut State Capitol in 2011

Florida State Seminoles
- Title: Defensive analyst

Personal information
- Born: August 16, 1949 (age 77); Cheshire, Connecticut, U.S.

Career information
- High school: Cheshire High School
- College: Penn State

Career history
- Cheshire HS (CT) (1972–1975) Assistant coach; Southern Connecticut (1976–1979) Assistant coach; Southern Connecticut (1980–1981) Defensive coordinator; Western Connecticut (1982–1986) Head coach; Syracuse (1987–1990) Assistant coach; Syracuse (1991–2004) Head coach; Dallas Cowboys (2005) Tight ends coach; Dallas Cowboys (2006–2007) Linebackers coach; Miami Dolphins (2008–2009) Defensive coordinator; Dallas Cowboys (2010) Defensive line coach; UConn (2011–2013) Head coach; Chicago Bears (2014) Defensive line coach; Houston Texans (2015) Defensive line coach; Boston College (2016–2017) Defensive line coach; Detroit Lions (2018–2019) Defensive coordinator; Florida (2020–2021) Special assistant to the head coach; Carolina Panthers (2022) Defensive line coach; Memphis Showboats (2024) Linebackers coach; Rhode Island (2025) Defensive analyst; Avon Old Farms (2025) Defensive line coach; Florida State (2026–present) Defensive analyst

Awards and highlights
- 1 NEFC (1985); 4 Big East (1996–1998, 2004); 2x ECAC Coach of the Year, Div. I-A (1992, 1995); ECAC/Vince Lombardi Foundation Coach of the Year (1996)

Head coaching record
- Regular season: NCAA: 145–90–1 (.617)
- Postseason: NCAA Bowls: 6–3 (.667); NCAA D-III: 0–1 (.000)
- Career: NCAA: 151–94–1 (.616)
- Coaching profile at Pro Football Reference

Paul Lucian Pasqualoni (/ˌpæskəˈloʊni/; born August 16, 1949) is an American football coach who currently serves as a defensive analyst at Florida State University.

Pasqualoni has served as the defensive coordinator of the NFL's Miami Dolphins and Detroit Lions, and as the defensive line coach and interim defensive coordinator of the Dallas Cowboys. He was the head coach of the Syracuse University football team from 1991 to 2004.

== Early life ==
A native of Cheshire, Connecticut, Pasqualoni attended Cheshire High School, where he lettered in football and basketball. Following graduation, he continued to Bordentown Military Institute, also lettering on the football squad, and graduating in 1968. Pasqualoni then enrolled at Penn State, where he was a walk-on and subsequent letterman, as a linebacker under head coach Joe Paterno. In 1972, he received a B.S in health and physical education, then finished his education at Southern Connecticut State, receiving a M.S. in physical education and human performance.

Pasqualoni began his coaching career in 1972, while a graduate student at Southern Connecticut, as an assistant at his alma mater, Cheshire High School, where he remained for four seasons. After completing his master's degree, he was hired in 1976 as an assistant at Southern Connecticut by then-head coach, George DeLeone, who also served as a future assistant at Syracuse with Pasqualoni under Dick MacPherson. Pasqualoni was promoted to defensive coordinator in 1980, a position which he held for two seasons.

In 1982, Pasqualoni was hired away from Southern by in-state school Western Connecticut State University, as its head coach and athletic director. In five seasons with the Colonials, he amassed a 34–17 record, and coached the team to a 1985 New England Football Conference championship and appearance in the NCAA Division III playoffs.

== Coaching career ==
=== College ===
==== Syracuse University ====
Pasqualoni was an assistant at Syracuse from 1987 until 1991, when he was promoted to head coach after the position was vacated by Dick MacPherson, who left for the NFL to coach the New England Patriots. The Orange (then known as the Orangemen) enjoyed a number of successful years with Pasqualoni at the helm. The team won the Fiesta Bowl over Colorado in 1992 and defeated Clemson 41–0 in the Gator Bowl in 1995, Donovan McNabb's freshman year. The team had a 6–3 record in bowl games under Pasqualoni. Pasqualoni's 14-year record with Syracuse was 107–59–1. His only losing season was in 2002 with a 4–8 record. Most seasons of his tenure saw Syracuse competing in the Top 25 in the country.

While coach of the Orangemen, Pasqualoni's roots in Connecticut led him to recruit many star players from Connecticut high schools, including Bloomfield's Dwight Freeney, New Britain's Tebucky Jones and the McIntosh brothers from Cheshire High School.

At the conclusion of the 2004 season the team lost the Champs Sports Bowl 51–14. New athletic director Daryl Gross fired Pasqualoni on December 29, 2004, despite Syracuse's president, Nancy Cantor, publicly stating that Pasqualoni would be on the sideline the next season. He was replaced by Greg Robinson, who had been serving as the defensive coordinator at the University of Texas. During the 2005 season, the first season in 14 years without Pasqualoni leading the team and the first in 17 years without him on the staff, the Orange posted a record of 1–10, the worst on-field record in the 117-year history of Syracuse football.

In 2015, Syracuse vacated all of its wins from 2004 due to ineligible players. As a result, Pasqualoni's final season is technically the first winless season in school history.

==== University of Connecticut ====
On January 13, 2011, Pasqualoni was hired to lead the University of Connecticut football program, by soon to be dismissed AD Jeff Hathaway, two weeks after former coach Randy Edsall left for the University of Maryland. His two full seasons saw identical records of 5–7 — only his second and third losing seasons as a Division I-A/FBS head coach. He was fired as coach of the Huskies on September 30, 2013, in the midst of his 3rd season after starting 0–4.

==== Florida Gators ====
Pasqualoni was hired by former Florida head Coach Dan Mullen before the 2020 season. He was retained by Billy Napier on December 29, 2021, with a new off field scout role. He left in 2022, after being hired by NFL's Carolina Panthers.

==== Rhode Island ====
Pasqualoni was hired as a defensive analyst for the 2025 season.

=== National Football League ===
==== Dallas Cowboys ====
Before becoming linebackers coach in 2005, Pasqualoni served as the Cowboys' coach of tight ends for the 2005 season, where he is credited for the continued development of Jason Witten leading to his second consecutive trip to the Pro Bowl. On November 8, 2010, Pasqualoni was promoted to interim defensive coordinator resulting from the firing of Wade Phillips, as Phillips served as both head coach and defensive coordinator for the Cowboys.

==== Miami Dolphins ====
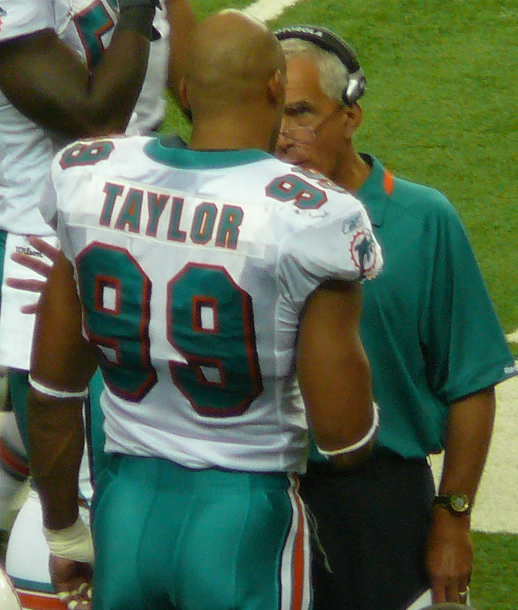
Pasqualoni (right) with Miami Dolphins linebacker Jason Taylor in 2009.

Pasqualoni was hired as the defensive coordinator of the Miami Dolphins on January 22, 2008.

Pasqualoni was fired by the Dolphins on January 11, 2010.

==== Return to Dallas ====
He was subsequently hired as the defensive line coach for the Dallas Cowboys.

==== Chicago Bears ====
On January 16, 2014, Pasqualoni was hired as the Chicago Bears defensive line coach.

==== Houston Texans ====
On January 25, 2015, Pasqualoni was hired as the Houston Texans new defensive line coach. On January 20, 2016, Pasqualoni resigned.

==== Detroit Lions ====
On February 7, 2018, Pasqualoni was hired as the defensive coordinator of the Detroit Lions. On January 2, 2020, Pasqualoni decided to step away from football, leaving his position in Detroit.

==== Carolina Panthers ====
Pasqualoni was hired by Matt Rhule in summer 2022 as a defensive line coach. After head coach change, new interim head coach Steve Wilks fired Pasqualoni along with cornerbacks coach Evan Cooper on November 7, 2022.

=== United Football League ===
==== Memphis Showboats ====
Pasqualoni was hired by the Memphis Showboats on January 4, 2024.

== Personal life ==
Pasqualoni is married to the former Jill Fleischman, whom he met while coaching at Syracuse University. Together, they have two sons, Dante Paul and Tito Lucian, and a daughter, Cami Mae. He is also the author, with Jim McLaughlin, of the book Coaching Youth Football, ISBN 0-07-137219-9.

== Head coaching record ==
Year	Team	Overall	Conference	Standing	Bowl/playoffs	Coaches^{#}	AP^{°}
Western Connecticut Colonials (New England Football Conference) (1982–1985)
1982	Western Connecticut	2–7	2–7	T–8th			
1983	Western Connecticut	7–3	6–3	4th			
1984	Western Connecticut	9–1	8–1	2nd			
1985	Western Connecticut	10–2	8–1	T–1st	L NCAA Division III First Round		
Western Connecticut Colonials (NCAA Division III independent) (1986)
1986	Western Connecticut	6–4					
Western Connecticut:		34–17	24–12				
Syracuse Orangemen/Orange (Big East Conference) (1991–2004)
1991	Syracuse	10–2	5–0	‡	W Hall of Fame	11	11
1992	Syracuse	10–2	6–1	‡	W Fiesta^{†}	7	6
1993	Syracuse	6–4–1	3–4	5th			
1994	Syracuse	7–4	4–3	T–3rd			
1995	Syracuse	9–3	5–2	3rd	W Gator	16	19
1996	Syracuse	9–3	6–1	T–1st	W Liberty	19	21
1997	Syracuse	9–4	6–1	1st	L Fiesta^{†}	20	21
1998	Syracuse	8–4	6–1	1st	L Orange^{†}	24	25
1999	Syracuse	7–5	3–4	T–3rd	W Music City		
2000	Syracuse	6–5	4–3	T–3rd			
2001	Syracuse	10–3	6–1	2nd	W Insight.com	14	14
2002	Syracuse	4–8	2–5	T–6th			
2003	Syracuse	6–6	2–5	T–6th			
2004	Syracuse	6–6	4–2	T–1st	L Champs Sports		
Syracuse:		107–59–1	73–34	‡ The Big East did not begin full round–robin play until 1993			
Connecticut Huskies (Big East Conference) (2011–2012)
2011	Connecticut	5–7	3–4	6th			
2012	Connecticut	5–7	2–5	T–6th			
Connecticut Huskies (American Athletic Conference) (2013)
2013	Connecticut	0–4					
Connecticut/UConn:		10–18	5–9				
Total:		151–94–1					
National championship Conference title Conference division title or championship game berth
^{†}Indicates Bowl Coalition, Bowl Alliance or BCS bowl.; ^{#}Rankings from final Coaches Poll.; ^{°}Rankings from final AP Poll.
