= Roaring Brook Falls =

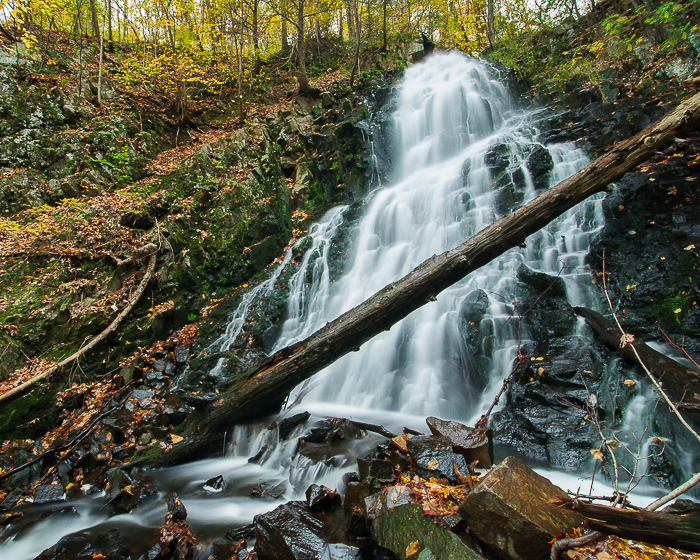
- Roaring Brook Falls after heavy rains in October.
- Interactive map of Roaring Brook Falls
- Location: Cheshire, New Haven County, Connecticut, United States
- Coordinates: 41.483200°N 72.942929°W
- Type: Horsetail
- Total height: 80 feet (24 m)
- Watercourse: Roaring Brook

Roaring Brook Falls is a waterfall in the southwestern hills of Cheshire, Connecticut in the Northeastern United States. Formed as the eponymous Roaring Brook descends a wooded cliffside on West Mountain, the waterfall is an 80-foot horsetail and ranks as one of the tallest in the state.

== History and conservation ==
Recovered arrowheads suggest that Algonquian Native Americans frequented the vicinity of Roaring Brook Falls prior to the arrival of settlers from the Connecticut Colony. Beginning as early as the 17th century, the surrounding landscape was clear-cut for agriculture and the falls were harnessed to power a stream-side mill. By the late 1800s, Roaring Brook Falls had become something of a local landmark with visitors from the nearby city of New Haven touring the area and enjoying the scenery.

The property encompassing the waterfall was still privately owned in 1974 when concerned locals discovered that it might be sold for development. Significant efforts were launched to save the property and, by 1978, the waterfall and surrounding forest was cooperatively preserved by the Town of Cheshire and the Cheshire Land Trust.

== See also ==
- List of waterfalls
- List of Waterfalls in Connecticut
- Cheshire, Connecticut
