= Ray Reckmack =

American football player (1914–1982)

- Raymond Reckmack at Syracuse, 1936

Profile
- Positions: End, halfback

Personal information
- Born: August 26, 1914; Cheshire, Connecticut
- Died: April 28, 1982 (aged 67); Allentown, Pennsylvania
- Listed height: 6 ft 0 in (1.83 m)
- Listed weight: 198 lb (90 kg)

Career information
- High school: Roxbury (MA), Cheshire Academy (CT)
- College: Syracuse

Career history
- Brooklyn Dodgers (1937); Detroit Lions (1937); Danbury Trojans (1937–1939)

Career statistics
- Games: 2
- Stats at Pro Football Reference

Raymond Vincent Reckmack (August 26, 1914 – April 28, 1982) was an American football player.

Reckmack was born in 1914 in Cheshire, Connecticut. He attended the Roxbury School where he was an all-around athlete.

He enrolled at Syracuse University in 1933 and played college football as a halfback and fullback for Syracuse from 1934 to 1936. While playing for Syracuse, he was known as "one of the finest forward passers in the country" and "an excellent blocking back."

After his time at Syracuse, he played professional football in the National Football League (NFL). He began his professional career in August 1937 with the Brooklyn Dodgers. He played one game at the end position for the Dodgers before being placed on waivers. He was then claimed by the Detroit Lions in October 1937. He appeared in one game for the Lions as a blocking back.

He also played at the fullback and halfback positions for the Danbury Trojans of the American Association from 1937 to 1939. He appeared in 12 games for the Trojans.

After his football career ended, Reckmack was a production analyst for the Western Electric Company's Allentown Works from 1947 to 1980. He died in 1982 at the Allentown and Sacred Heart Hospital Center in Allentown, Pennsylvania.
