= Cheshire Public Schools =

School district in Connecticut, United States

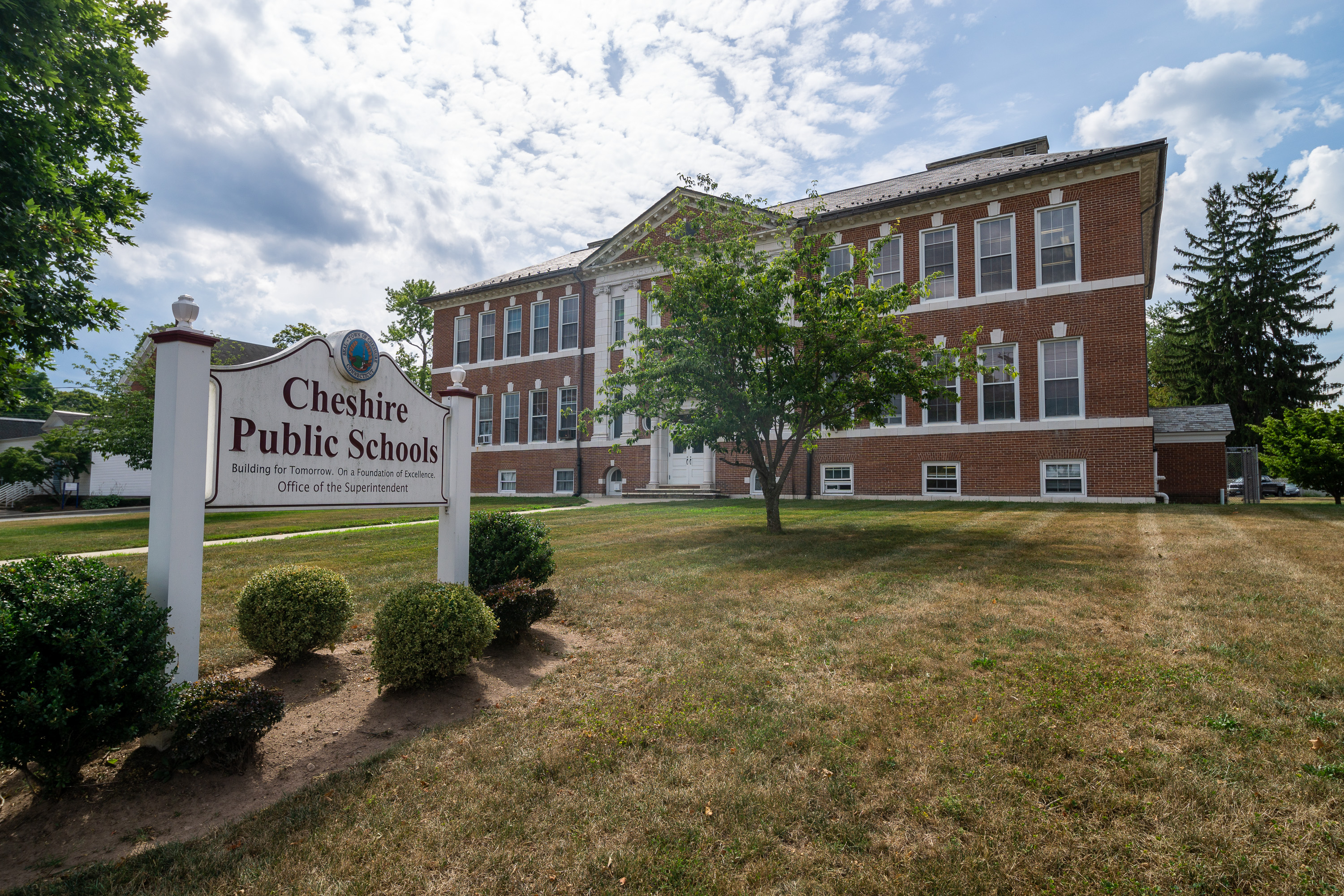

Address
- 29 Main Street Cheshire, Connecticut 06410 United States

District information
- Type: Public
- Grades: Pre-K-12

Cheshire Public Schools is the school district of Cheshire, Connecticut, United States. In 1992 and 2024, the district had about 4300 students from kindergarten through high school level.

In 1997, Cheshire's district superintendent Ralph Wallace announced that he "wouldn't recruit minority teachers in a thousand years," and made other critical comments about diversity goals, leading to increased state monitoring and press coverage. In 2024, the district spent $19,189 per student, and was ranked 109th out of 166 Connecticut school districts in per-pupil spending.

== Schools ==
=== Secondary ===
- Cheshire High School
- Dodd Middle School

=== Primary ===
- Barnum School
- Doolittle School
- Highland School
- Norton School

=== Alternative ===
- Humiston School (alternative high school)
