= William Devin Howell =

American serial killer (born 1970)

- Connecticut Department of Correction inmate mugshot
- Born: February 11, 1970 (age 56); Hampton, Virginia, U.S.
- Other name: Sick Ripper
- Status: Incarcerated
- Convictions: Murder (6 counts); First degree manslaughter
- Penalty: 360 years imprisonment

Details
- Victims: 7
- Span of crimes: January – October 2003
- Country: United States
- State: Connecticut
- Date apprehended: May 15, 2005
- Imprisoned at: Cheshire Correctional Institution

William Devin Howell (born February 11, 1970) is an American serial killer who was convicted of murdering seven women in 2003. He is one of the most prolific serial killers in Connecticut history. In November 2017, while already serving a 15-year prison sentence for manslaughter, he was sentenced to six consecutive life sentences (a life sentence in Connecticut is 60 years in prison, meaning he was sentenced to 360 years in prison), which he is currently serving at Cheshire Correctional Institution.

== Victims ==
The victims were identified as seven women, including one transgender woman, Janice Roberts. Their bodies were discovered in two locations, including an area behind a shopping plaza on Hartford Road in New Britain, referred to by Howell as his "garden". The person who discovered this principal body dump, at the start of 2005, by which time the remains were mostly skeletal, had been looking for an area to hunt in. The ground is wooded and marshy and inaccessible by car, which delayed the investigation and recovery of the victims.

=== Melanie Ruth Camilini ===
29-year-old Melanie Ruth Camilini, a mother of two from Seymour, went missing on January 1, 2003. She had recently been living in Waterbury and was last seen in that area with two men. Camilini was known to have a substance abuse problem and would regularly disappear for long periods of time. Her body was discovered buried behind a New Britain shopping center and was identified in 2015.

=== Janice Roberts ===
Janice Roberts (b. October 5, 1958), a 44-year-old transgender woman from New Britain. She was last seen alive on June 18, 2003, when observed getting into Howell's blue van outside a Stop & Shop in Wethersfield. She was reported missing on June 24. Howell later told an informant that he tried to engage Roberts in a sexual act and, upon realizing that she was a transgender woman, strangled her.

=== Diane Cusack ===
Diane Cusack, a 55-year-old New Britain resident, disappeared in mid-2003. Police last had contact with her on July 9, during a landlord-tenant dispute. Her remains were found behind the New Britain shopping plaza in 2007, and she was identified in 2011. Cusack, who had had a substance abuse problem, had been out of contact with her family for years and had never been reported missing.

=== Nilsa Arizmendi ===
On July 31, 2003, a woman told police that her sister, 33-year-old Nilsa Arizmendi, had not been heard from for 7 days. Arizmendi's boyfriend, a convicted drug dealer, was immediately a suspect in her disappearance but was ultimately cleared after passing a polygraph test. The sister told police that Arizmendi was a heroin user and sex worker who was living in a motel in Wethersfield along with her boyfriend. He told investigators that he and Arizmendi had allowed Howell to stay overnight in their room and that he last saw Arizmendi at 2:30 .a.m on July 25, 2003, when she got into Howell's van. Arizmendi's body was found on April 28, 2015, along with the bodies of three other women.

=== Marilyn Gonzalez ===
Marilyn Gonzalez, a 26-year-old woman and the mother of two children, went missing in 2003 after she left her home in Waterbury. Her body was found behind the shopping plaza in New Britain, Connecticut on April 28, 2015.

=== Joyvaline Martinez ===
Joyvaline "Joy" Martinez, 23, went missing on October 10, 2003, but was not reported missing until March 29, 2004. Suspicion arose when she did not show up for her birthday party. She was last spotted in her hometown of East Hartford, where she lived with her mother. In high school, she had been a track star and, at the time of her disappearance, was unemployed. Her remains were some of the first to be recovered from the shopping plaza area in 2007, and she was identified in 2013.

=== Mary Jane Menard ===
Mary Jane Menard, 40, a mother of two from Waterbury. A former addict, she had turned her life around to become a substance abuse counselor. She went missing from New Britain in October 2003 and her remains were found behind the shopping plaza in 2007.

== Investigation ==
All seven victims disappeared in 2003 and the cases remained unsolved for months, until Howell became a suspect in Arizmendi's disappearance in April 2004. Police seized his van in North Carolina and discovered that several of the seat cushions had been removed, but blood from two people was found soaked into the floor of the van underneath some carpet. DNA taken from Arizmendi's relatives determined that one of the blood samples was 99 percent certain to have come from Arizmendi. They also found 6 videotapes of Howell having "bizarre" sex with women, but the videos were shot in a way to ensure that their faces were not clearly visible.

Howell was arrested in Hampton, Virginia, on May 15, 2005. Because Arizmendi's body was yet to be found, Howell was charged at that time with first degree manslaughter. Later, he was also charged with witness tampering after threatening another inmate. In January 2007, shortly after the trial began, Howell entered an Alford plea to first degree manslaughter, meaning that he did not admit to the crime but conceded that the prosecution had enough evidence to make a conviction likely.

At sentencing, Howell continued to insist that he did not kill Arizmendi, arguing that the blood stains were from a physical fight that Arizmendi had in the van with her boyfriend. He also tried to get his Alford plea thrown out, claiming that he had only entered the plea because his public defender pressured him. Howell was sentenced to 15 years in prison for manslaughter in the first degree.

Just weeks later, a hunter found human bones behind a shopping plaza in New Britain. They were later identified as Cusack, Martinez, and Menard. More remains were discovered on April 28, 2015, and they were identified as Arizmendi, Gonzalez, Camilini, and Whistnant.

Howell later told his cellmate that there was a monster inside of him and described himself as a "sick ripper," which led to Howell being referred to as the Sick Ripper by some media outlets. He also told the inmate during a card game that he kept one of the women's bodies in his van for two weeks because it was too cold outside to bury her. He slept next to her and called the victim his "baby." Howell later cut off the tips of her fingers, dismantled her bottom jaw and disposed of the body parts in Virginia.

On November 17, 2017, Howell was sentenced to six consecutive life sentences after pleading guilty to the murders of Cusack, Martinez, Menard, Gonzalez, Camilini, and Roberts. He cried and apologized to the families of the victims during sentencing, calling his actions "monstrous, cowardly and selfish." He told the court that he deserved the death penalty, which was abolished by the Connecticut Supreme Court in 2015.

== Book ==
His Garden: Conversations with a Serial Killer is an autobiographical and biographical true crime book by true crime author Anne K. Howard that was written about Howell. A practicing attorney, Howard first contacted Howell in July 2015, when he was serving a fifteen-year sentence for the murder of Nilsa Arizmendi. He was about to be charged for the remaining six murders. After pleading guilty to the remaining six murder charges on September 8, 2017, he exclusively gave detailed confessions to Howard in letters and recorded phone calls.

== See also ==
- List of serial killers in the United States
