= Adam Kaloustian =

American television producer

- Born: Adam Jason Kaloustian; April 30, 1980 (age 46); Cheshire, Connecticut, United States
- Occupation: Producer
- Years active: 2003-present
- Spouse: Kimbery Kaloustian (2006-present)

Adam Kaloustian is best known as the senior producer of the hit NBC reality series, The Biggest Loser. He resides in Los Angeles, California, with his wife, Kim, and their daughter.

== Early life ==
"Adam Jason Kaloustian" was born on April 30, 1980, in Cheshire Connecticut to Sharon Kaloustian, a pre-school teacher, and Kenneth V. Kaloustian, the Chairman of Biomedical Sciences and pathologist's assistant at Quinnipiac University. He graduated from Cheshire High School in 1998 and went on to enroll in the communications program at Quinnipiac, hoping to one day land a network television job.

== Hard Work ==
After graduating from Quinnipiac University with a degree in communications in 2002, he and his then, girlfriend and future-wife, Kim, moved to Los Angeles. By the end of 2003, Kaloustian was hired by a small production company in Los Angeles. He was discouraged when he was only given the tasks to run errands and get coffee for people, so he would help sound guys wrap cable and follow producers around, hoping to learn from them. After a while, Kaloustian was doing a lot more, becoming involved in the actual production of the shows. After hard work and long hours, Kaloustian landed a job with Reveille Productions. From there, he was able produce shows such as Blow Out, American Gladiators, and Shear Genius.

== The Biggest Loser ==
In 2007, 3Ball Productions offered Kaloustian a job as senior producer of the already hit reality series, The Biggest Loser. Since then, the show has become even more popular and has an average fan base of 9.3 million viewers from 8 PM to 10 PM.
