= Dorothy Cox (archaeologist) =

American archaeologist and WW2 spy (d. 1977)

- Born: Dorothy Hannah Cox; 1892
- Died: 1977 (aged 84–85)
- Other name: Hiram (codename)
- Occupations: Archaeologist, spy, and numismatist

Academic background
- Education: Undergraduate degree, Bryn Mawr College; MA in Architecture, Columbia University

Academic work
- Discipline: Archaeology, Architecture
- Sub-discipline: Excavation architecture, Numismatics

Dorothy Hannah Cox (1892-1977) was an American archaeologist and spy known for her work in excavation architecture and numismatics, and for engaging in espionage during World War II.

== Early life and education ==
Born in 1892, Dorothy Hannah Cox was the daughter of Lewis J. Cox, and was the sister of American inventor and businessman Frank Cox. She completed her undergraduate studies Bryn Mawr College in 1914 and received a Master's degree in architecture from Columbia University. She was fluent in French, Turkish, and Greek, and served as a nurse in World War I.

== Archaeological career ==
Cox was involved in Hetty Goldman's excavation of the ancient Greek cities of Eutresis and Colophon from 1924 - 1927 as architect and trench supervisor. The two recorded the architectural plan of the Metroon at Colophon together. Cox also assisted J.P. Harland in processing the archaeological finds and making detailed drawings of the architecture at Tsoungiza, a Late Bronze Age site in Greece. From 1934 - 1939, she worked with Goldman once more on her excavations at Tarsus, Turkey. During her lifetime, Cox authored several works on numismatics, pottery, and the findings of her excavations.

== Espionage in WWII ==
At the beginning of World War II, Cox was selected by the Office of Strategic Services (OSS) to join the Greek Desk led by American archaeologist turned spy-ringleader Rodney Young. Young recommended Cox because he found her to be reliable and cooperative, and because her work compared favorably with those of the men selected to join the operation. To prepare for this mission, Cox was briefed in skills related to field espionage, including covert communications, cryptography, identifying German and US military equipment, interpreting and creating intelligence reports, and firearms training. Cox was referred to by the codename "Hiram" by her colleagues in the OSS.

The British Chief of Middle East Relief and Rehabilitation advised Cox to remain in Cairo, saying that she could only be of use if she worked under him in Egypt. She ignored this and travelled to İzmir where she established her own intelligence operations independent of British intervention. While in Izmir, she reported to her superiors and colleagues in Cairo, Washington, D.C. and the Office of Naval Intelligence on the activities of enemy deserters, Greek refugees, and special agents who ended up in Turkey.

Cox operated in Turkey under the pretense of being a civilian relief worker with the Greek War Relief Association, and interviewed refugees in Sinai Peninsula, Aleppo, and Beirut. Her position allowed her to utilize resources from organizations like the Red Cross. A sympathizer of the National Liberation Front, Cox aided Greek leftist guerillas by supplying them with money, food and supplies in exchange for information. She believed that "it was impossible for anyone but supermen or super morons to be neutral". Her position allowed her to gather intelligence on conditions within Greece, and to use Turkish officials to gather more information. Cox reflected that "as representative of the Greek War Relief, [they] came to [her] for supplies of clothes, food and medicine. In exchange they gave information."

She gained a reputation for her fearlessness, discernment, and ability to coax information from people. Despite her effectiveness as a spy, Cox was only paid secretarial wages and was repeatedly denied supplies and support by her superiors Washington, D.C.

== Later life and death ==
After the conclusion of the war in 1945, Cox returned to the US where she became the curator of coins for Yale University. During the 1950s and 1960s, Cox reunited with some of her colleagues from the OSS on excavations in Gordium, Turkey and Balkh, Afghanistan. She retired to Cheshire, CT, in 1953. She died in 1977.

== Selected bibliography ==
- The Numismatic Iconography of Justinian II (685-695, 705-711 A.D.). American Numismatic Society. 1958.
- A Third Century Hoard of Tetradrachms from Gordion. University of Pennsylvania. 1953.
- The Excavations at Dura-Europos: Conducted by Yale University and the French Academy of Inscriptions and Letters. Yale University Press. 1949.
- The Greek and Roman Pottery. Yale University Press. 1949.
- A Tarsus Coin Collection in the Adana Museum. American Numismatic Society. 1941.
- The Silver Dollars of the United States of America: With a Short Sketch of the 1804 Dollars. American Numismatic Society. 1940.
- Greek and Roman Plated Coins: By William Campbell. American Numismatic Society. 1933.
- The Tripolis Hoard of French Seignorial and Crusades Coins. American Numismatic Society. 1933.
- On the Coins of Narbonensis with Iberian Inscriptions. American Numismatic Society. 1929.

== See also ==
- Virginia Grace
- Hetty Goldman
- Rodney Young (archaeologist)
