= Cheshire Historic District =

- U.S. National Register of Historic Places
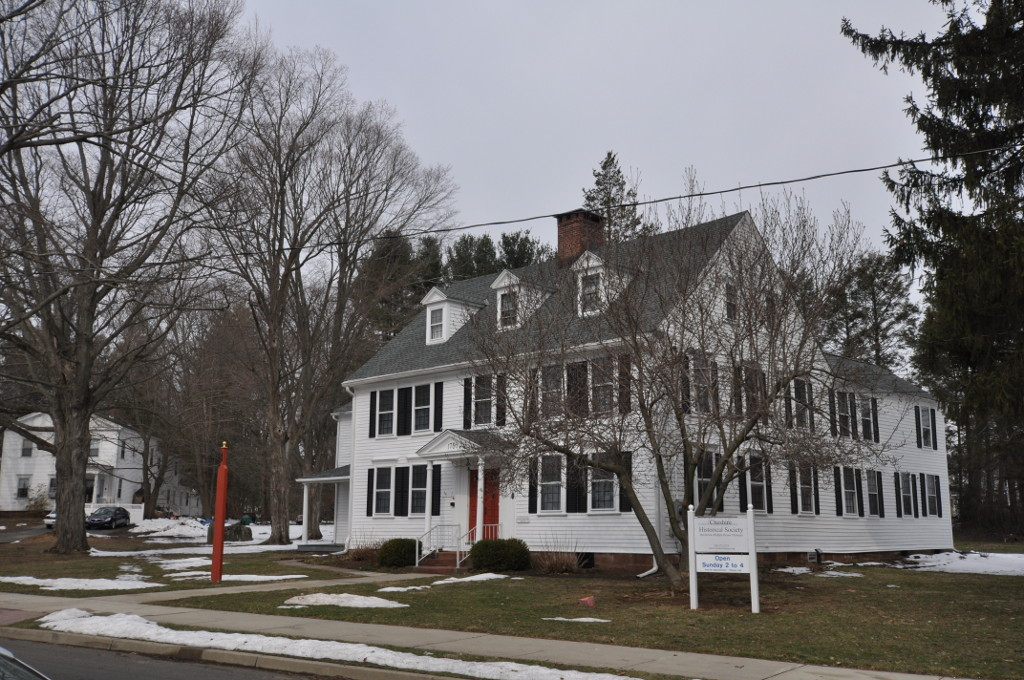

- Location within Connecticut Location within the United States
- Location: Roughly bounded by Main Street, Highland Avenue, Wallingford Road, South Main, Cornwall, and Spring Streets, Cheshire, Connecticut
- Coordinates: 41°29′50″N 72°54′15″W
- Area: 35 acres (14 ha)
- Built: 1720
- Architect: Hoadley, David; Et al.
- Architectural style: Colonial Revival, Late Victorian, Colonial Cape;Georgian
- NRHP reference No.: 86002793
- Added to NRHP: August 29, 1986

The Cheshire Historic District encompasses the historic town center of Cheshire, Connecticut. Centered on the junction of Main Street and Academy Road, the district's architecture is reflective of the town's development over two centuries, and includes many of its civic buildings. It was listed on the National Register of Historic Places in 1986.

== Description and history ==
The town of Cheshire was settled in 1694 by colonists from adjacent Wallingford, which it remained a part of until incorporating separately in 1780. The town center arose around the location of the first meeting house, where the First Congregational Church (built 1826) now stands. It was a predominantly agricultural community, with the only industry consisting of saw and grist mills serving local needs. It briefly benefited in the mid-19th century from the mining of copper and barite, a time at which it also saw expansion of industry occasioned by improved transportation. In the 20th century it was transformed into a suburban bedroom community.

The historic district is roughly linear in shape, anchored by a stretch of Main Street between Horton Avenue and Cornwall Avenue, and also extending for a distance along Wallingford Road. It covers about 35 acres (14 ha), and is predominantly residential, with a significant concentration of houses built before 1850. Most of these are wood-frame structures, either 1-1/2 or 2 1/2 stories in height, with gabled roofs. In addition to the First Congregational Church, there are two other churches in the district, as well as the 1867 town hall, an unusually late example of Greek Revival architecture. On South Main Street is a well-preserved late 18th-century commercial building.

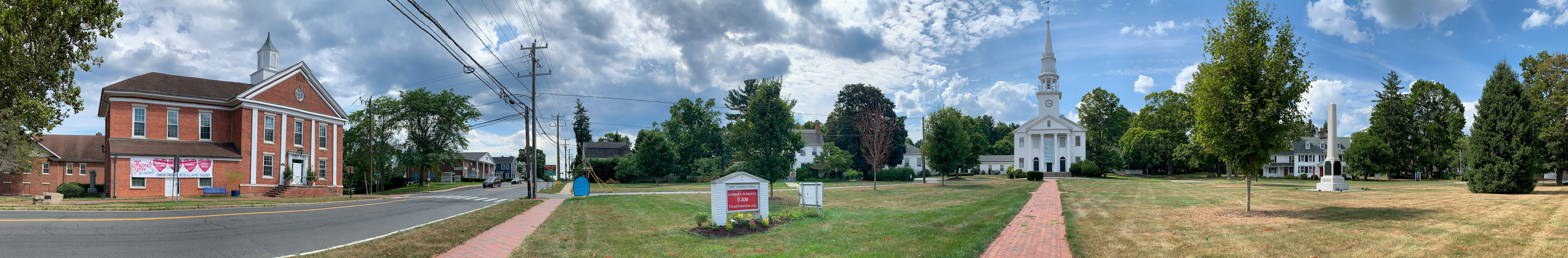
Panorama of Cheshire Historic District. Left to right: Town Hall, Congregational Church, Historical Society, and Civil War memorial.

== See also ==
- National Register of Historic Places listings in New Haven County, Connecticut
