= Matthew Steven Johnson =

American serial killer

- Born: May 24, 1963 (age 63); Hartford, Connecticut, U.S.
- Conviction: Murder (3 counts)
- Penalty: 180 years imprisonment

Details
- Victims: 3–5
- Span of crimes: 2000–2001
- Country: United States
- State: Connecticut
- Date apprehended: January 13, 2002
- Imprisoned at: Cheshire Correctional Institution

Matthew Steven Johnson (born May 24, 1963) is an American serial killer and rapist who murdered at least three female sex workers from 2000 to 2001. He is also suspected in the deaths of another two women, but hasn't been charged in their deaths. Johnson was convicted of the three murders and was sentenced to 180 years in prison.

== Biography ==
=== Early life ===
Matthew Steven Johnson was born in Hartford, Connecticut, on May 24, 1963. He was raised with nine siblings, including a twin, and grew up in Hartford's Blue Hills and Asylum Hill neighborhoods. At 12, he lost sight in one eye when he was shot with a pellet gun. He was described as a very sweet child, but exhibited immature behavior, such as sucking his thumb when asked to do something he did not want to do. His kindergarten teacher later stated to a psychologist that he was highly aggressive and unable to cope with denial.

By the time he was a teenager, he had been admitted to the Connecticut Children's Medical Center and repeatedly evaluated. Although he was noted for doing well in music and physical education, Johnson had a limited academic ability due to his intellectual disability and also suffered from seizures, which had to be medicated. His recorded IQ is 69.

At age 17, Johnson had very little contact with his father, but still visited his family on the weekends. He had also grown tired of evaluations and stopped taking his medication, claiming it made him feel dizzy. During this time Johnson reportedly grew depressed and began mixing drugs and alcohol to calm himself. At one point, however, he managed to seek help at The Institute of Living in Hartford, earning his high school equivalency diploma before beginning work as a laborer.

=== Crimes ===
At 19, while living in a home for troubled youth, Johnson tried to kill a security guard during an attempted robbery inside Asylum Hill's Cathedral of St. Joseph. He was sentenced to 10 years imprisonment for this attack, but only served four. Before that, in May 1980, he robbed and assaulted a pregnant woman. In 1988, Johnson forcefully restrained a woman on the street, and about two years later, he raped and beat another woman. In both instances, he was caught because the women managed to identify him.

After his eventual release from prison and now a homeless drifter, Johnson began luring drug-addicted prostitutes to secluded areas around Hartford. After having sex with them, he would then strangle before repeatedly stomping his victims, crushing their necks and skulls in the process. His victims were:

- Aida Quinones (33) - killed in April 2000
- Rosali Jimenez (33) - killed in August 2000
- Alesia Ford (37) - killed in July 2001

Johnson is also suspected, but not charged in, the deaths of another two women who died in a similar fashion:

- LaDawn Roberts (28) - found dead on a back porch in Garden Street, June 1999
- Rosalind A. Casey (32) - found dead on Sigourney Street, June 2000

== Arrest and sentence ==
After forensic scientist Henry Lee managed to connect the similar deaths using the DNA test results, authorities in the city began hunting for the women's killer. Using semen, blood splatters and cigarette butts found on each of the bodies, they put it in a database for convicted sex offenders and obtained a match for Matthew Steven Johnson. He was arrested on January 13, 2002, and subsequently brought to trial.

During the court hearing, Gabriel Jimenez, brother of Rosali Jimenez, pleaded the jury to give Johnson the max penalty. When asked to respond, the accused said that he felt for the victims' families, but still refused to admit his guilt. When he heard the announcement of his verdict, Johnson remained slumped down in his chair, looking straight ahead and without response. Connecticut law only allows for a maximum sentence of 60 years in prison for murder, unless special circumstances apply, so Johnson was sentenced to 60 years on each count, to run consecutively, a total of 180 years.

In 2008, Connecticut's Supreme Court upheld the verdict, after Johnson failed to persuade the court that he should've had three separate trials for the deaths. He also claimed that he couldn't have had his DNA on them, as he hadn't had sex with a woman since 1982.

== See also ==
- List of serial killers in the United States
