= Jay Gitlin =

American historian

Jay Gitlin is an American historian. He is a professor of North American history at Yale University, associate director of the Howard R. Lamar Center for the Study of Frontiers & Borders, and an expert on French North American history. He is also the Coordinator of the Committee on Canadian Studies at the MacMillan Center for International and Area Studies, a faculty affiliate of the Yale University Native American Cultural Center, and founder of the Yale Journal of Canadian Studies.

== Education ==
Gitlin received his BA, MM, and PhD degrees at Yale University.

== Awards and honors ==
Gitlin won the 2010 Alf Andrew Heggoy Prize for the best book in French colonial history from the French Colonial Historical Society for his book The Bourgeois Frontier.

== Books ==
- Under an Open Sky: Rethinking America’s Western Past, (W. W. Norton & Company, 1992).
- The Bourgeois Frontier: French Towns, French Traders & American Expansion (Yale University Press, 2010)
- Country Acres and Cul-de-sacs: Reimagining Connecticut, 1938 to 1952 (Wesleyan University Press, 2018)
- French St. Louis (University of Nebraska Press, 2021)
