= Manson Youth Institution =

State prison in Connecticut

Coordinates: 41°31′44″N 72°54′05″W

- Interactive map of Manson Youth Institution
- Location: 42 Jarvis Street Cheshire, Connecticut
- Status: Open
- Security class: Level 4
- Capacity: 679
- Population: 322 (June 2019)
- Opened: 1982
- Managed by: Connecticut Department of Correction
- Director: Derrick Molden

Manson Youth Institution is a Connecticut Department of Correction state prison for men under the age of 21. It is located in Cheshire, New Haven County, Connecticut. Although it has a capacity of 679, it currently houses less than half that (322 as of June 2019).
