= Albert E. Burke =

American academic (1919–1999)

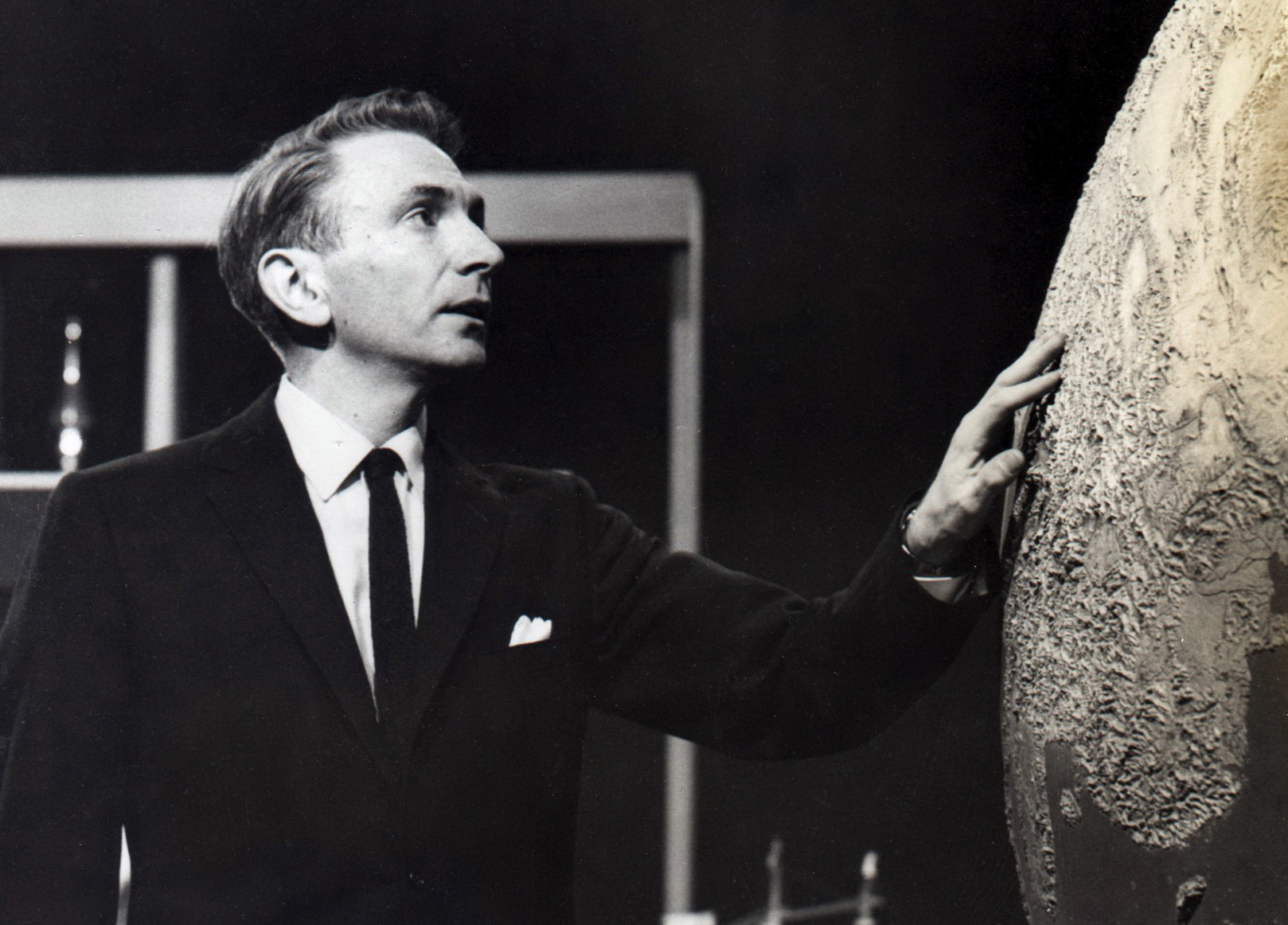
Dr. Albert E. Burke on Survival

Albert E. Burke (1919–1999) was a Yale University professor and a pioneer of public educational television. Burke was an early environmentalist, advocating for stewardship of the environment in the 1950s. He rose to national fame as an early media personality on radio and television, and as an author and in-demand public speaker.

== Education ==
Burke received both bachelor's and master's degrees in Earth Science from UCLA. He completed graduate work at Harvard in 1951.

Burke held a doctorate in International Relations from the University of Pennsylvania. His dissertation was "A political economic survey of Soviet Central Asia" (1959).

== Yale ==
Burke arrived at Yale in 1952 after graduate work at both UCLA and Harvard. He initially taught the basic geography course and courses on Russia, where he had lived for two years.

Burke was Director of Graduate Studies in Conservation and Resource Use at Yale (1951-1957).

== Television ==
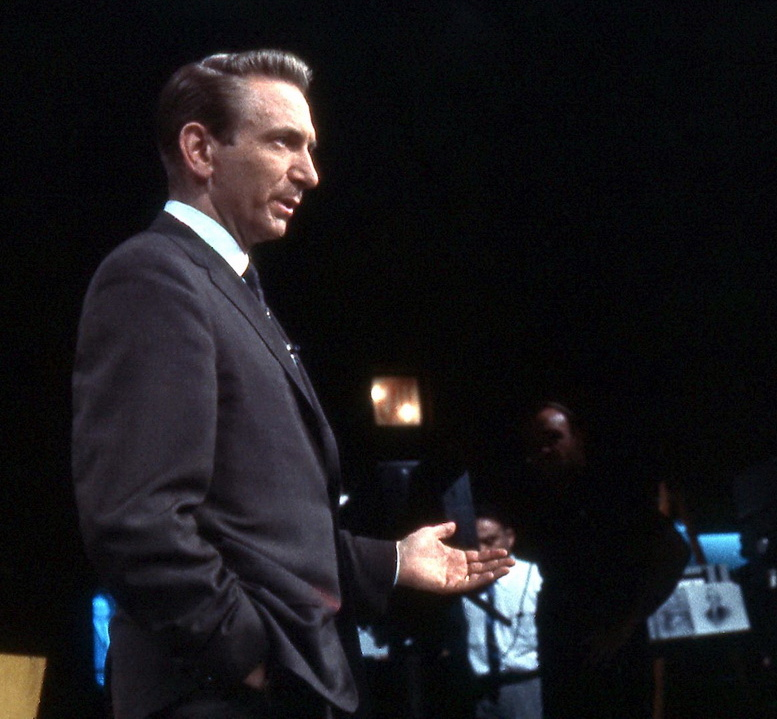
Dr. Albert E. Burke at NBC Studios

Burke was a pioneer of educational television. When the new medium of television became available, Burke thought to bring his classes to the public through television as a way to increase education.

Burke began his television career in Connecticut, then developed a long relationship with the National Broadcasting Company (NBC). His first show, "This is Your World," appeared in 1951 on local station WNHC in New Haven, Ct. He was one of several professors involved in educational programming supported by a collaborative initiative between the Educational Television and Radio Center (ETRC) and NBC in 1957, when he hosted "Geography for Decision" while he was serving at the American Institute of Resource Economics. Burke also became Educational Broadcasting consultant for NBC in 1957. In 1958, his next show "Survival" was underwritten by NBC. "Geography for Decision" and "Survival" were both filmed at NBC's New York studios. In 1960, his next series "A Way of Thinking" was produced by Ted Yates for Metropolitan Broadcasting. In 1961, he was nominated for two New York Emmys, for "Most Outstanding Interview or Discussion Program" for "A Way of Thinking" and "Most Outstanding Performer" for that series. Burke came to national prominence with his series "Probe--with Dr. Albert Burke."

In 1960, Jack Gould of The New York Times called Burke "AN [sic] exciting new voice -- provocative, sensible and challenging."

== Personal background ==
The son of Russian immigrants, Samuel Edwards Burkenblit and Helen Hamburg, Burke was born Albert Burkenblit, but he shortened his last name to Burke. His father, Samuel, was born Nov. 15, 1890, and married his wife, Helen, on February 10, 1918. Originally from Rostov-Don, Sam was a structural engineer who worked as an architect and engineer for the Allen & Garcia Company in Chicago building industrial sites and bridges. They had two children, Albert and Marshall.

Albert Burke's wife, Ruth C. Burke, was a research scientist at Yale. They also had two children, a son and a daughter.

Burke lived in several countries, including Russia, China, Germany, Czechoslovakia, and Latin America. He also lived in Latin America and had spent time with Native American tribes. He spoke a wide range of languages, including French, German, Russian, Spanish, Italian, and Bulgarian.

== Publications ==
Burke published Enough Good Men: A Way of Thinking in 1962. He also authored "Certain Aspects of Soviet Agriculture" in Russian Research at Harvard by C. Kluckhohn (1949).
