= Alan Hoskins =

Alan Hoskins is the American CEO of Energizer, and has been since July 2015. He has worked with the company in executive and other positions for 33 years. He began his career at Union Carbide. He also serves on the board of directors of the Retail Industry Leaders Association. He holds business administration degrees from Western New England University and Webster University.
