= Jacques Leveugle =

French teacher and criminal (1946–2026)

- Born: 1946; Annecy, France
- Died: 19 September 2026 (aged 79)
- Occupation: Teaching
- Criminal charges: Child molestation, murder

Details
- Span of crimes: 1967–2022
- Country: Algeria, Colombia, France, Germany, India, Morocco, New Caledonia, Niger, Switzerland, and the Philippines
- Target: Teenage boys (13–17 years of age)
- Date apprehended: 2024

Jacques Leveugle (1946 – 19 September 2026) was a French teacher, pedophile and sexual predator. He has also admitted to killing his terminally ill mother and aunt as acts of mercy. During his career as a foreign-language teacher and sports instructor in Europe, Asia and North Africa, evidence indicates that he assaulted 89 boys aged between 13 and 17, spanning five decades. His sex crimes were discovered and revealed by his nephew through files on a USB flash drive in 2022. After a year of criminal investigation, he was taken into police custody in 2024.

In February 2026, the French National Gendarmerie issued an international appeal to victims or witnesses to the crimes of Leveugle to report themselves for support in the legal proceedings. A separate homicide investigation was also launched simultaneously. He died in 2026 before facing trial.

== Biography ==
Leveugle was born in Annecy at the Auvergne-Rhône-Alpes region of Southeastern France. He variously worked as French tutor (informal teacher), sports instructor (such as in holiday camps) and study of caves during his entire profession. He did not have formal qualifications as a school teacher or sports instructor.

Between 1965 and 1969 Leveugle worked at various places in France, Germany and Switzerland; between 1969 and 1975, he worked in Algeria and France; for the next five years, he moved to Algeria, France, Morocco and Switzerland; between 1980 and 1985, he lived in New Caledonia and Colombia; from 1986 to 1996, he worked in France, Germany, Morocco and Switzerland; and between 1996 and 2023, he worked in Colombia, France and Morocco. He had been recognised as a "beloved teacher", a "respectable man" or "a devoted and very good teacher" by his students.

He first visited Morocco in 1955 and developed a liking for the country. At the time his father worked at the French embassy in Rabat. He spent much of his childhood and completed his elementary education there. Even after returning to France, he continuously visited or sporadically worked there from 1974 until his retirement. He settled there in retirement, taking a home at Khenifra and working in the community. Known to the Moroccans as the "thin French man", he devoted his time to giving free language lessons, helping the poor and job seekers, organising field trips for students and running a children's library until his arrest in 2024.

In addition to French, Leveugle spoke fluent Arabic and Moroccan languages including Shilha, a Berber language popularly used in Khenifra.

== Criminal exposé and capture ==
In October 2023, Leveugle's nephew who had been suspicious of his uncle's behaviour discovered a USB drive in which his uncle had carefully recorded his sexual exploitations while Leveugle was away on a hiking trip. The electronic memoir contained "15 tomes of very dense material", as the prosecutor reported, revealing relationships with at least 89 individuals aged between 13 and 17 years with whom Leveugle had sexual activities. The nephew shared this information and the digital files with the National Gendarmie of Vizille, who would later determine that Leveugle's assaults had spanned his entire 55-year career (1967–2022) and had taken place in every country where Leveugle had worked.

In February 2024, Leveugle was arrested and was held in custody in Grenoble. At the time, he was travelling from Morocco to visit his brother in the department of Isère near Grenoble, where French police made the arrest. In April 2025, he was put to pretrial detention until the final prosecution. He had resided in Khenifra from the early 2000s. Although no criminal acts were observed, his neighbours recounted unusual behaviours such as spending time with young boys of around 13 to 15 years of age. In one instance, he guided school children to a lake in Aguelmam Azegza where he asked all the students to swim naked, saying that it was a healthy practice. In his memoir, he wrote that homosexuality with an adult repulsed him.

=== Charges ===
Upon his arrest, Leveugle was charged with aggravated rape and sexual assault of minors. He was charged with the sexual abuse of ten boys in Morocco (although authorities suspect there were more) and two in Algeria.

=== Murder ===
The USB compendium also contained Leveugle's record of two murders, without further specifics. However, while in custody, Leveugle admitted to the homicides and specified that one was his mother and the other was his aunt. He explained that his mother had been terminally ill due to cancer and in 1974 he had suffocated her with a pillow to end her suffering, and that in 1992 he killed his 92-year-old aunt on her deathbed in the same way when she begged him not to leave. Leveugle had been staying with her and had been planning to move to the Cévennes region of France.

== Investigations ==
On 10 February 2026, the Grenoble prosecutor Étienne Manteaux through the National Gendarmerie released an appeal "Call for witnesses" to anyone who had witnessed or was a victim of Leveugle's crimes. This was the first time the identity and name of the accused was made public. The public appeal was necessary as many of the victims were recorded by Leveugle in vague pet names or not meantioning the names, making them unidentifiable. As of the public appeal, only 40 individuals had been identified, with a statute of limitations rendering potential cases before 1993 ineligible for prosecution. Manteaux remarked that the urgency and publicity was due to the suspect's age and difficulty in identifying most of the victims.

A separate homicide investigation was also launched alongside the international public appeal. By July 2026, 79 individuals were identified as victims of sexual assault, of which 55 were interviewed and 24 of them filed a formal case. The trials were planned for 2027.

== Death ==
Leveugle died in custody at Lyon-Corbas detention in Isère at the age of 79. His death was announced by the Grenoble prosecution office on 21 September, stating: "Jacques Leveugle, aged 79, died in detention this Saturday, September 19, following an incurable disease." With his death, the plan for trial and further investigations were ended.
